= Silesians =

Inhabitants of the Silesia region

Ślōnzŏki, Ślůnzoki (Silesian) Schläsinger, Schläsier (Lower Silesian) Ślązacy (Polish) Schlesier (German) Slezané (Czech)
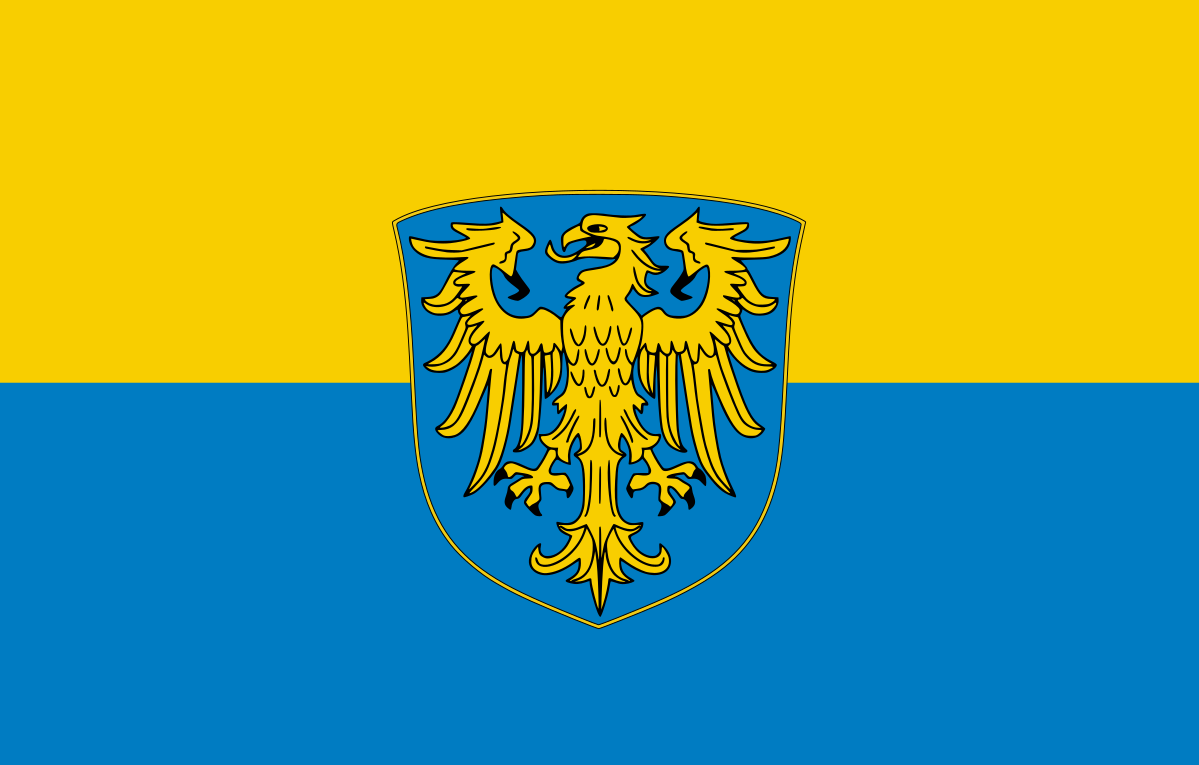
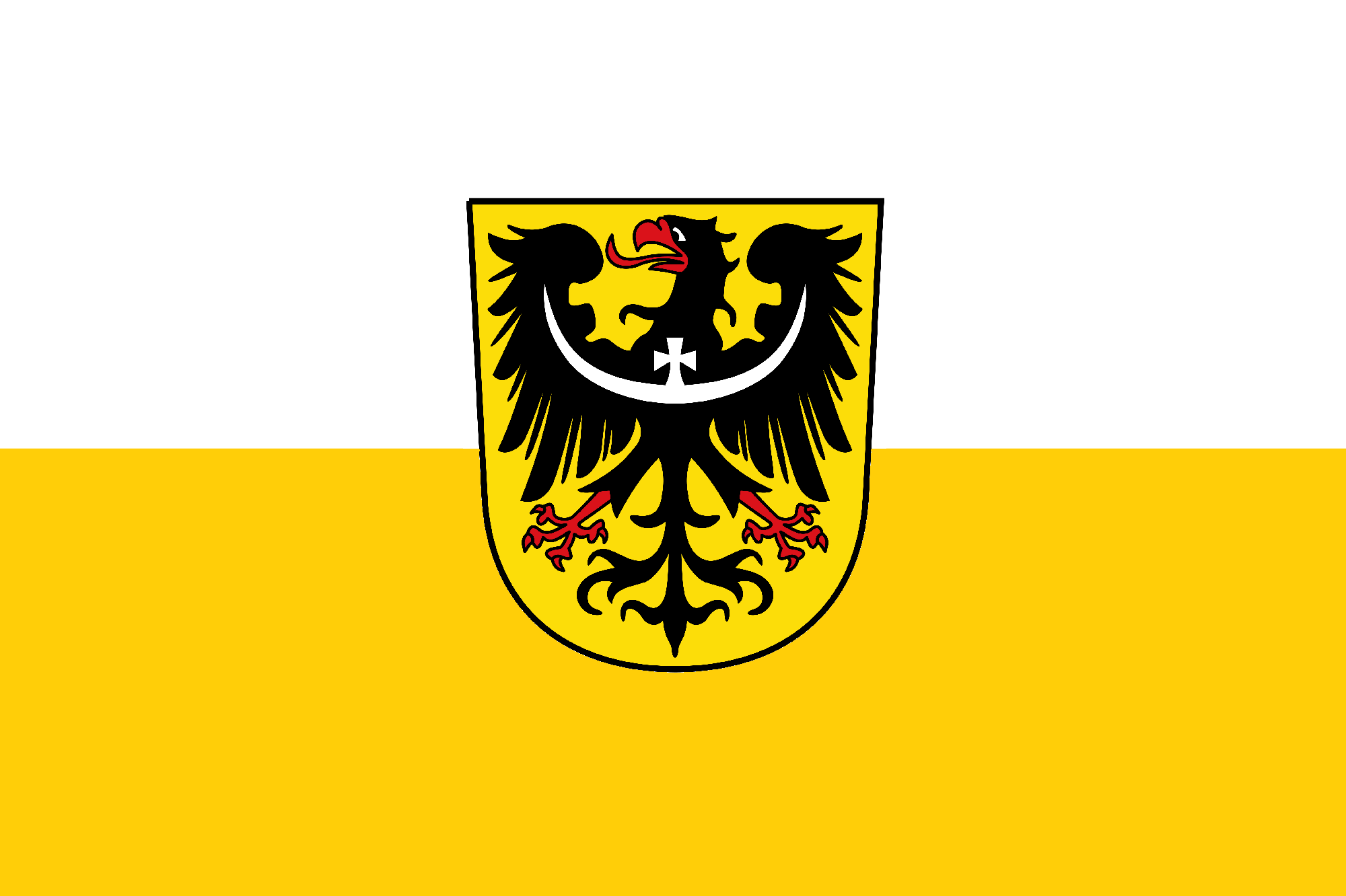
- Flag of Upper Silesia

Total population
- Several million (of which about 0.6 million officially declared Silesian nationality in national censuses in Poland, the Czech Republic and Slovakia).

Regions with significant populations
- Germany: Unknown number
- Poland: 596,224 officially declared Silesian nationality. (Polish-Silesian nationality included)
- Czech Republic: No data, 31,301 declared Silesian nationality, of which 12,451 declared it as their only nationality
- Slovakia: 117

Languages
- Silesian; Polish (New mixed dialects, Kraków dialect); German (incl. Silesian German dialects); Czech (Lach dialects)

Religion
- Roman Catholicism; Protestantism (Mainly Lutheranism)

Related ethnic groups
- Other West Slavs, other Germans, Vilamovians

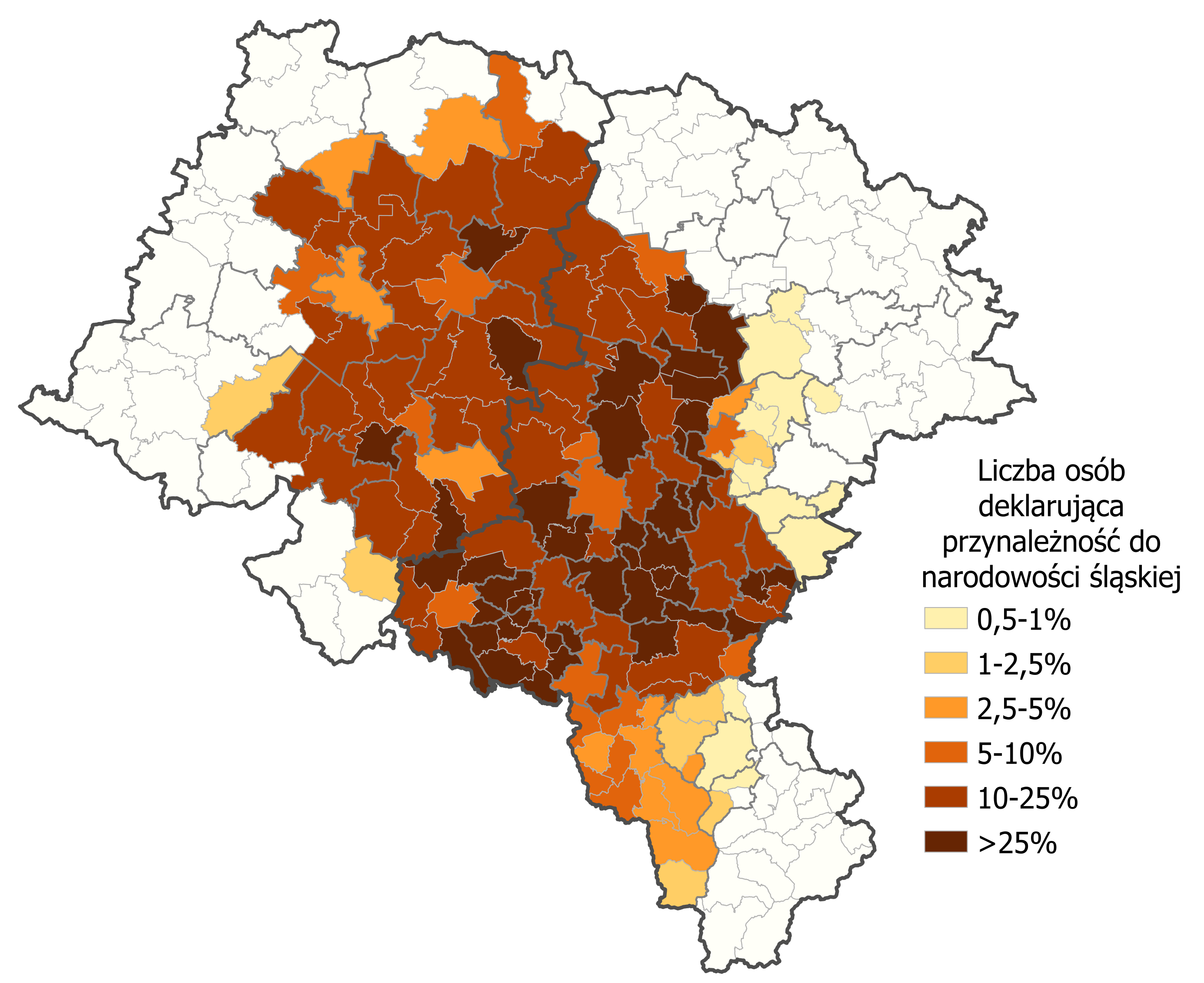
Silesians in the Opole and Silesian Voivodeships of Poland (2021 census)

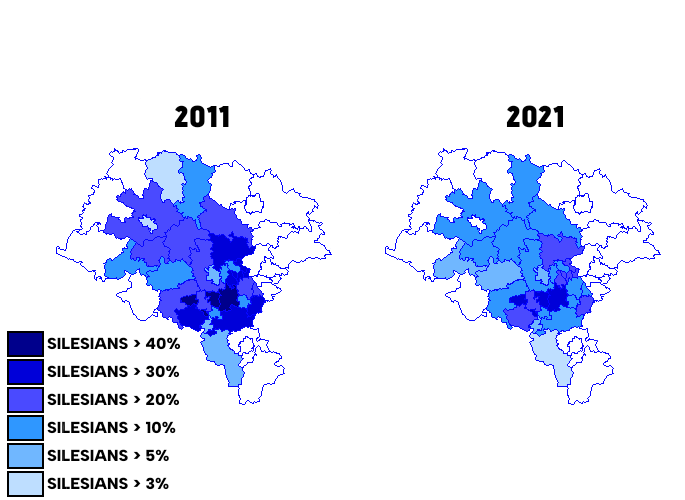
Silesians in the Opole and Silesian Voivodeships of Poland (2011 and 2021 censuses)

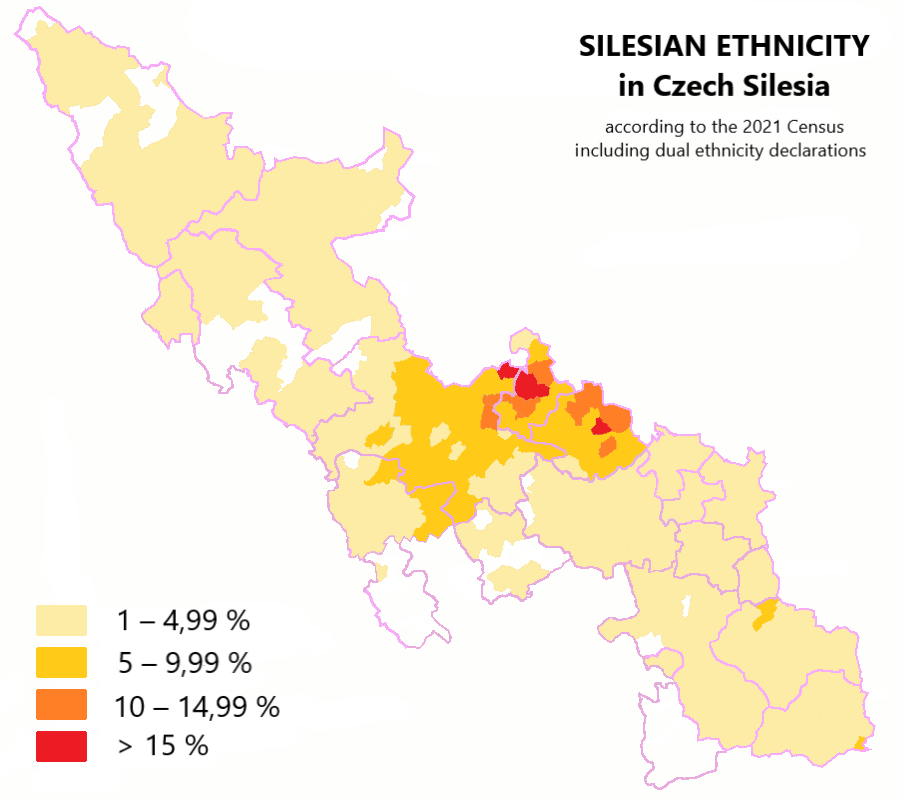
Silesians in Czech Silesia (2021 census)

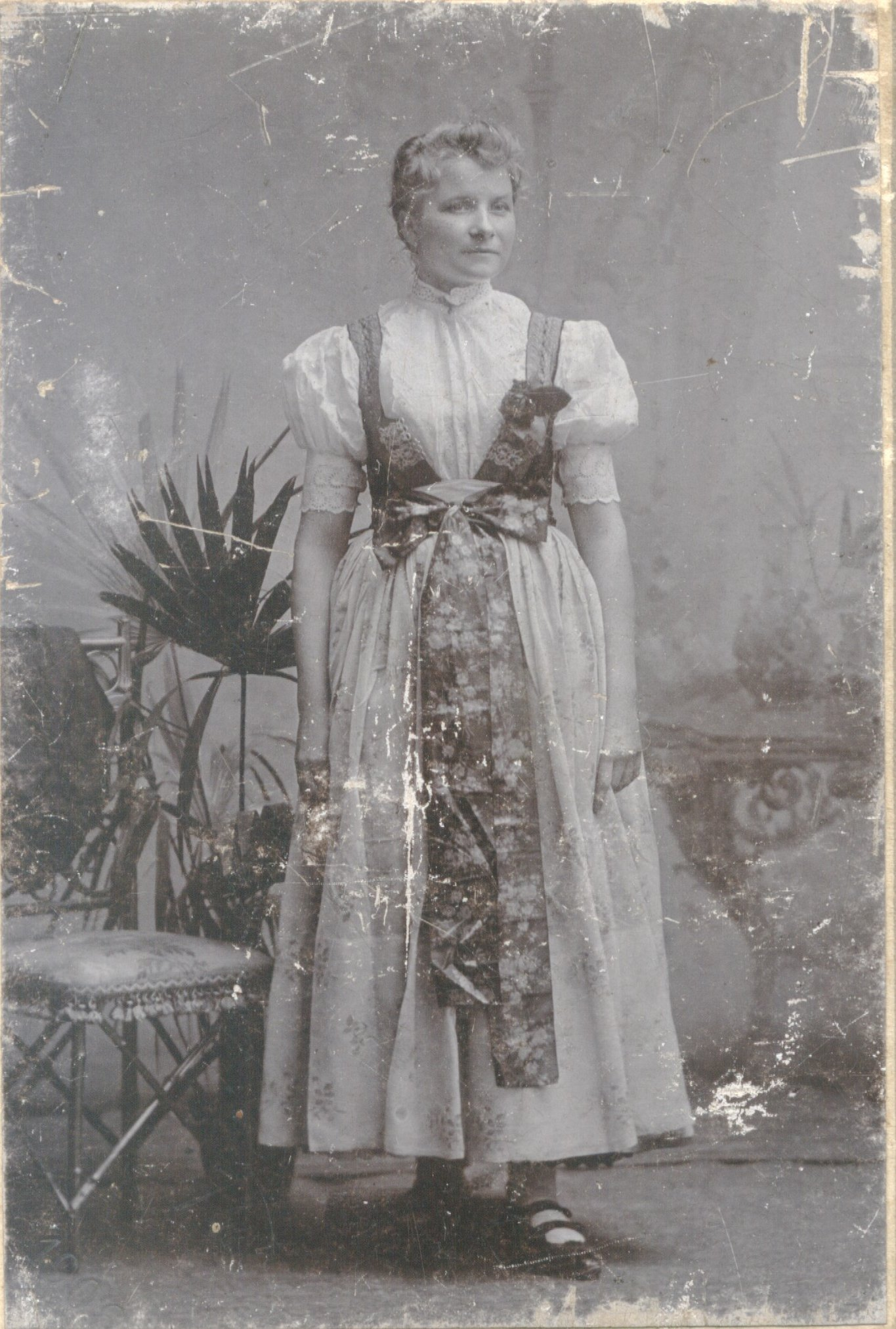
Woman in Silesian dress from Cieszyn Silesia, 1914

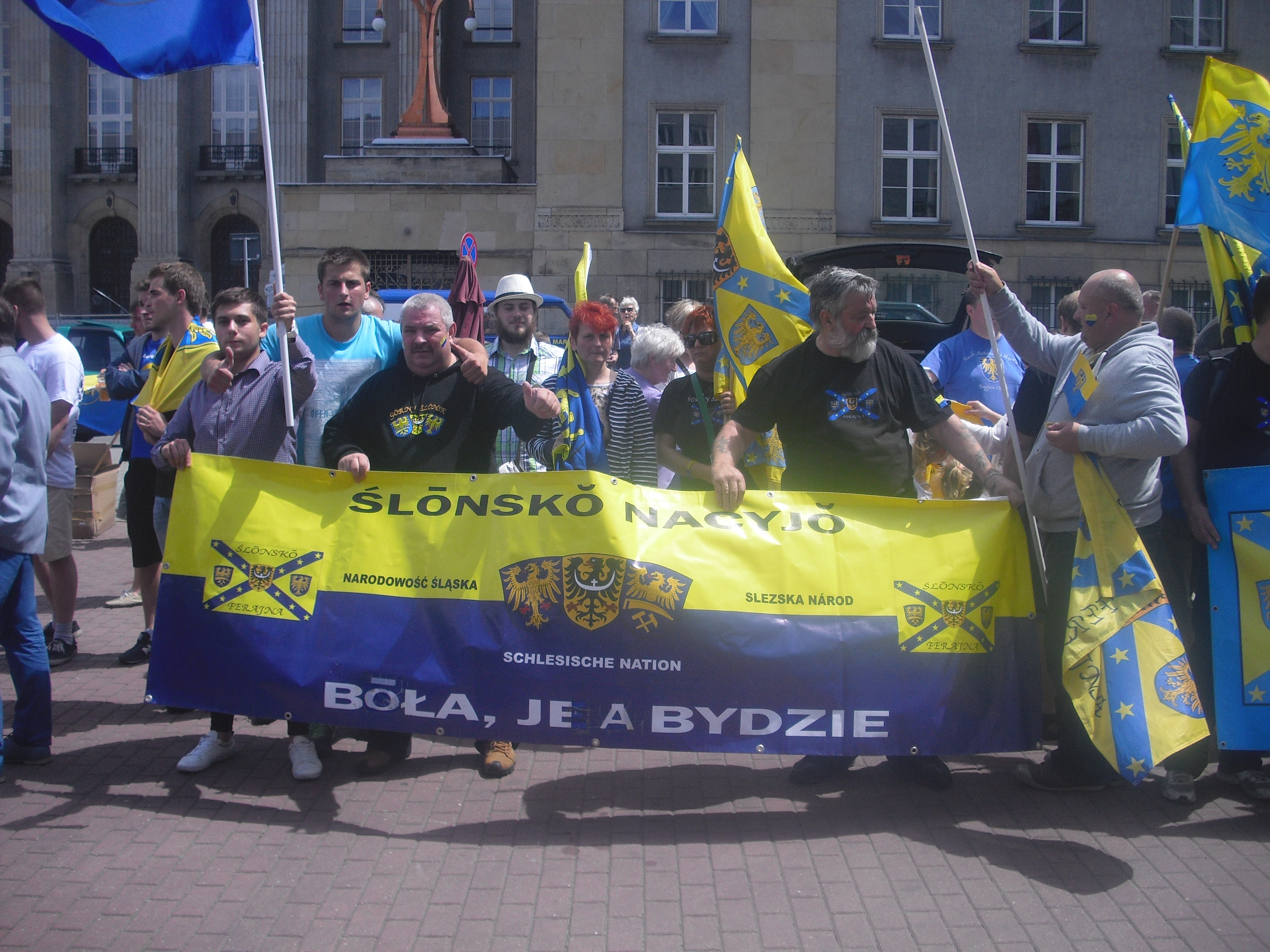
"Ślōnskŏ nacyjŏ bōła, je a bydzie", which means "Silesian Nation was, is, and will be" - Eighth Autonomy March, Katowice, 18 July 2009

Silesians (Silesian: Ślōnzŏki or Ślůnzoki; Silesian German: Schläsinger or Schläsier; German: Schlesier pronounced [ˈʃleːzi̯ɐ]; Polish: Ślązacy; Czech: Slezané) is both a linguistic as well as a geographical term for the inhabitants of Silesia, a historical region in Central Europe divided by the current national boundaries of Poland, Germany, and the Czech Republic. Historically, the region of Silesia (Lower and Upper) has been inhabited by Poles (West Slavic Lechitic people), Czechs, and Germans. Therefore, the term Silesian can refer to anyone of these ethnic groups. However, in 1945, great demographic changes occurred in the region as a result of the Potsdam Agreement leaving most of the region ethnically Polish and/or Slavic Upper Silesian. The names of Silesia in different languages most likely share their etymology—Polish: Śląsk; German: Schlesien pronounced [ˈʃleːzi̯ən]; Czech: Slezsko [ˈslɛsko]; Lower Silesian: Schläsing; Silesian: Ślōnsk [ɕlonsk]; Lower Sorbian: Šlazyńska [ˈʃlazɨnʲska]; Upper Sorbian: Šleska [ˈʃlɛska]; Latin, Spanish and English: Silesia; French: Silésie; Dutch: Silezië; Italian: Slesia; Slovak: Sliezsko; Kashubian: Sląsk. The names all relate to the name of a river (now Ślęza) and mountain (Mount Ślęża) in mid-southern Silesia, which served as a place of cult for pagans before Christianization.

Ślęża is listed as one of the numerous Pre-Indo-European topographic names in the region (see old European hydronymy). According to some Polonists, the name Ślęża [ˈɕlɛ̃ʐa] or Ślęż [ɕlɛ̃ʂ] is directly related to the Old Polish words ślęg [ɕlɛŋk] or śląg [ɕlɔŋk], which means dampness, moisture, or humidity. They disagree with the hypothesis of an origin for the name Śląsk [ɕlɔ̃sk] from the name of the Silings tribe, an etymology preferred by some German authors.

The term "Silesia" is a Latinized word of the original Polish/Lechitic name "Śląsk" inhabited by the ancient Lechitic tribes called Ślężanie. In Silesia, there are many places of the ancient Slavic Lechitic pagan cult of these ancient people, for example Góra Ślęża.

About 209,000 of the Upper Silesian population declared themselves as pure Silesians, 376,000 people declared themselves as having a joint Silesian and Polish nationality while only 471,000 people declared themselves to be of only Polish nationality from Silesia in the 2011 Polish national census making them the largest minority group in Poland. About 126,000 people declared themselves as members of the German minority (58,000 declared it jointly with Polish nationality), making it the third largest minority group in the country (93% of Germans living in Poland are in the Polish parts of Silesia). 31,301 people declared Silesian nationality in the 2021 Czech census, including 18,850 of those who declared two nationalities (44,446 in Czechoslovakia in 1991), and 6,361 people declared joint Silesian and Moravian nationality in the 1991 Slovak national census. Over 85% of the population in the Polish part of Upper Silesia declare themselves as Poles, and in the Czech part as Czechs.

During the German occupation of Poland, Nazi authorities conducted a census in East Upper Silesia in 1940. At the time, 157,057 people declared Silesian nationality (Slonzaken Volk), and the Silesian language was declared by 288,445 people. However, the Silesian nationality could only be declared in the Cieszyn part of the region. Approximately 400–500,000 respondents from the other areas of East Upper Silesia who declared "Upper Silesian nationality" (Oberschlesier) were assigned to the German nationality category. After World War II in Poland, the 1945 census showed a sizable group of people in Upper Silesia who declared Silesian nationality. According to police reports, 22% of people in Zabrze considered themselves to be Silesians, and that number was around 50% in Strzelce County.

== History ==
Archaeological findings of the 20th century in Silesia confirm the existence of an early settlement inhabited by Celtic tribes.

Until the 2nd century some parts of Silesia were populated by Celtic Boii, predecessors of the states of Bohemia and Bavaria and subsequently until the 5th century, by the Germanic Silingi, a tribe of the Vandals, which moved south and west to invade Andalusia. Silesia remained depopulated until the second phase of the migration period.

The Slavs, predominantly White Croats entered the depopulated territory of Silesia in the first half of the 6th century. The Slavic territories were mostly abandoned, because the Celtic and Germanic tribes that lived there before had moved west. Chronologically, the first group of Slavs were those that dwelt by the Dnieper River, the second was the Sukov-Dzidzice type Slavs, and the last were groups of Avaro-Slavic peoples from the Danube river areas. In the early 9th century, the settlement stabilized. Local West Slavs began to erect a series of defensive systems, such as the Silesian Przesieka and the Silesia Walls to guard them from invaders. The north-eastern border with Western Polans was not reinforced, due to their common culture and language.

The 9th-century Bavarian Geographer records the tribal names of the Opolanie, Dadosesani, Golenzizi, Lupiglaa, and the Ślężanie. The 1086 Prague Document, which is believed to document the 10th-century settlements, also mentions the Bobrzanie and Trzebowianie tribes. Later sources classified those tribes as Silesian tribes, which were also jointly classified as part of Polish tribes. The reason for this classification was the "fundamentally common culture and language" of Silesian, Polan, Masovian, Vistulan, and Pomeranian tribes that "were considerably more closely related to one another than were the Germanic tribes."

According to Perspectives on Ethnicity, written by anthropologist V. I. Kozlov and edited by R. Holloman, the Silesian tribes, together with other Polish tribes, formed what is now Polish ethnicity and culture. This process is called ethnic consolidation, in which several ethnic communities of the same origin and cognate languages merge into one.

=== Middle Ages ===
The Silesians lived on the territory that became part of the Great Moravia in 875. Later, in 990, the first Polish state was created by Duke Mieszko I, and then expanded by king Boleslaw I at the beginning of the 11th century. He established the Bishopric of Wrocław in Lower Silesia in the year 1000.

In the Middle Ages, Slavic tribal confederacies, and then Slavic states, dominated. Silesia was part of Great Moravia, then Kingdom of Bohemia and finally the Piast monarchy of Poland. The tribal differences started to disappear after the consolidation of Poland in the 10th and 11th centuries. The main factors of this process were the establishment of a single monarchy that ruled over all Polish tribes, as well as creation of a separate ecclesiastical organization within the boundaries of the newly established Polish state. The names of the smaller tribes disappeared from historical records, as well as the names of some prominent tribes. However, in some places, the names of the most important tribes transformed into names representing the whole region, such as Mazovians for Mazovia, and Silesians for Silesia. As a result of the fragmentation of Poland, some of those regions were again divided into smaller entities, such as the division of Silesia into Lower Silesia and Upper Silesia). However, the tribal era was already over, and these divisions reflected only political subdivisions of the Polish realm. Within Poland, from 1177 onward, Silesia was divided into many smaller duchies. In 1178, parts of the Duchy of Kraków around Bytom, Oświęcim, Chrzanów and Siewierz were transferred to the Silesian Piasts, although their population was of Vistulan and not of Silesian descent. Parts of those territories were bought by the Polish kings in the second half of the 15th century, but the Bytom area remained in the possession of the Silesian Piasts, even though it remained a part of the Diocese of Kraków. Between 1327 and 1348, the duchies of Silesia came under the suzerainty of the Crown of Bohemia, which was then passed to the Habsburg monarchy of Austria in 1526.

Beginning in the 13th century, sparesly settled Slavic Silesia began to be settled by Germans from various German regions. Silesia was by then attached the Bohemia, which itself was part of the Holy Roman Empire of the German Nation. Over a few generations, ethnic structure of the province was completely changed and various German dialects of the new settlers became widely used throughout Lower Silesia and some Upper Silesian cities. However, after the era of German colonization, the Polish language was still predominant in Upper Silesia and parts of Lower and Middle Silesia north of the Odra river. There, Germans usually dominated large cities, and Poles mostly lived in rural areas. This required the German authorities to issue official documents in Polish, or in German and Polish. The Polish-speaking territories of Lower and Middle Silesia, commonly called the Polish side until the end of the 19th century, were mostly Germanized in the 18th and 19th centuries, except for some areas along the northeastern frontier.

=== Modern history ===
In 1742, most of Silesia was seized in the War of the Austrian Succession by King Frederick the Great of Prussia, who named himself a 'Piast prince' (he was actually a remote descendant) in his first declaration. The remainder of Silesia, known as Cieszyn Silesia, remained in the Austrian Empire. The Prussian part of Silesia constituted the Province of Silesia until 1918. Later, the province was split into the Prussian provinces of Upper and Lower Silesia. Owing to the development of education, a rebirth of Polish culture took place in the second half of the 1800s in Silesia, which was connected with the emergence of a Polish national movement of a clearly Catholic character. At the beginning of the twentieth century, the fact that Silesians were part of the Polish nation was not questioned. The language and culture of the self-declared Polish Silesians were put under the pressure of the Prussian Kulturkampf policies, which attempted to Germanize them in culture and language. The process of Germanisation was never completely successful. The cultural distance of Upper Silesians from the German population resulted in the development of Polish national awareness at the turn of the nineteenth and twentieth centuries, culminating in the pro-Polish movements at the end of World War I.

German and later by Moravian neighbors called the Slavic Upper Silesians Wasserpolen. This name has been known since at least the 17th century and seems to refer to the Polish population in a German-Polish border region. On the other hand, Germans in Upper Silesia were called Rajchy (those from the Reich). As the result of the division of Silesia between Prussia and Austria, the terms Prusocy (the Prussians) and Cesarocy (the Imperial) also appeared. Prusocy referred to the inhabitants of Prussian Silesia, Cesarocy to those of Austrian Silesia. The latter referred both to the inhabitants of Cieszyn Silesia and, in part, to the western, Austrian partition of Poland, i.e. the western part of the Krakow region. Older people still know on these terms, which reflect a border that ceased to exist after World War I. The name Prusocy was later replaced by Hanysy, and is often used by Upper Silesians to refer to themselves, although the term sounds offensive to the ears of Polish newcomers (przybyszy) who arrived after 1945.

After the conflicts termed Silesian Uprisings, which also involved intervention of the Polish government, the eastern minor, but richer, part of Upper Silesia became part of the newly restored Poland; most of the land that had been ruled by the Habsburgs following the 1742 war went to Czechoslovakia, while Lower Silesia and most of Upper Silesia remained in Germany. The ethnic situation of the region became more complex as the division of Upper Silesia into Polish and German parts led to ethnic polarization. The people that lived in the western part of Upper Silesia were subject to a strong German Ostsiedlung, where those living in the eastern part of Silesia started to identify with the Polish culture and statehood.

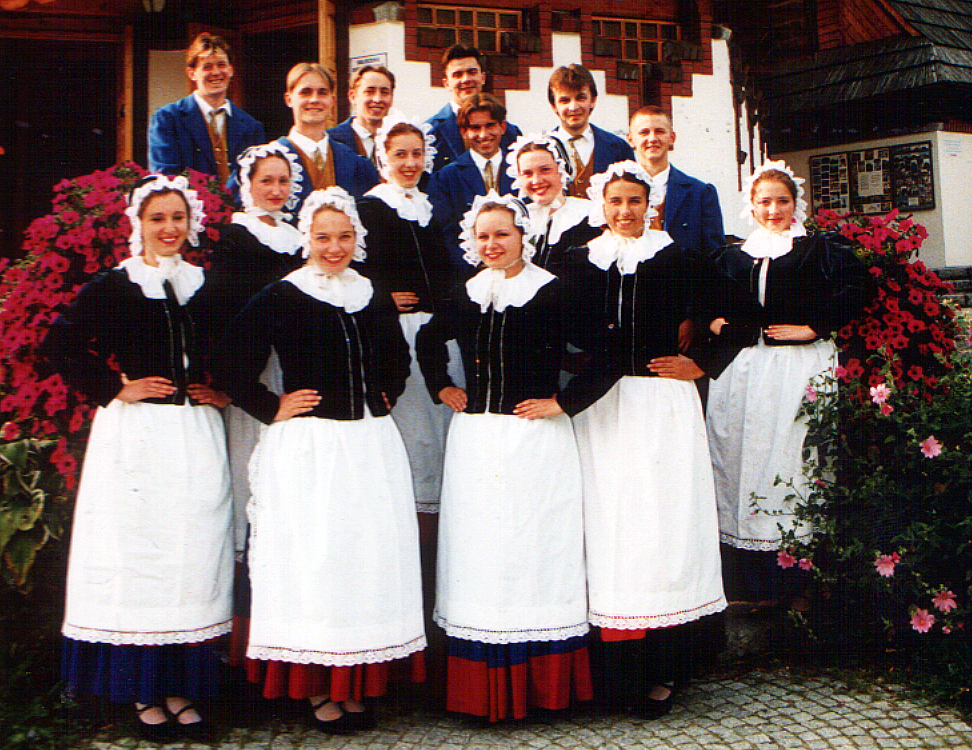
Traditional costumes from Lower Silesia

World War II and its aftermath amplified this polarization. Three groups took shape within the Silesian population. The Polish-speaking group was the largest, while the German-speaking group, which primarily lived in central Silesia, was noticeably smaller. A third group supported separatism and an independent Silesian nation-state. The separatists were of marginal importance, finding little support among native Silesians.

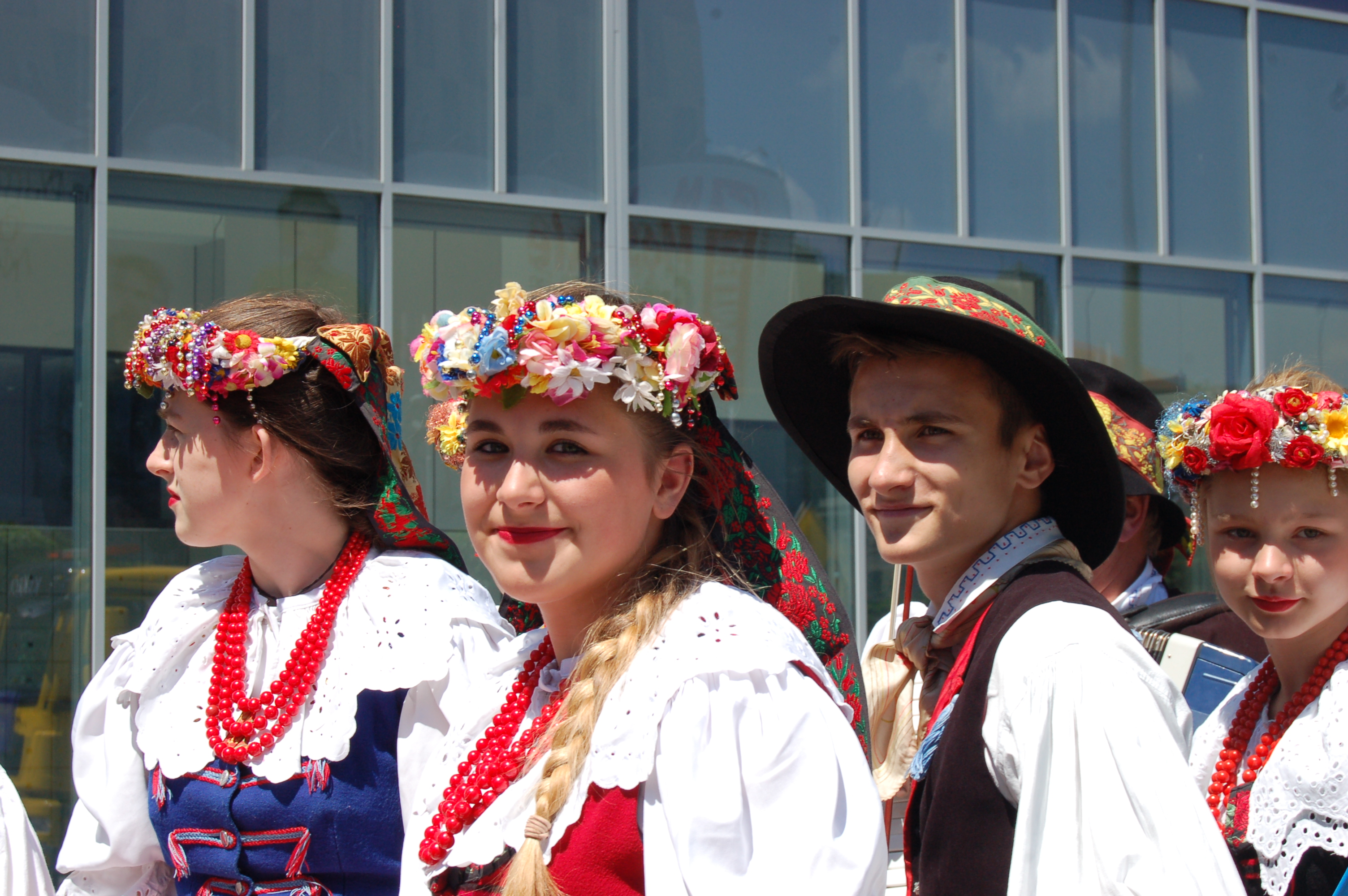
Silesians in traditional costumes during the 2015 Autonomy March

The reasons for these transitions were boundary shifts and population changes that came after World War II. As a result, the vast majority of the former German Silesia, even Lower Silesia, which did not have sizeable Polish-speaking population, was incorporated into Poland, with smaller regions remaining under the control of the German Democratic Republic (which later became a part of unified Germany). Czechoslovakia obtained most of Cieszyn Silesia. Millions of Silesians, mostly of German ethnicity, were subsequently forcibly expelled, but after being sifted out from the ethnic Germans by a process of "national verification", the Silesians classified as "autochthons" by the Polish communist authorities were allowed to remain, and they were intensely polonized.

Between 1955 and 1959, under the supervision of the Red Cross, some of the remaining Silesians were able to emigrate to West and East Germany to reunite with their families there. But some had to wait for years. Until 1989, nearly 600,000 Silesians emigrated to Germany.

Between 1945 and 1949, millions of ethnic Poles from the former (pre-1939) eastern Poland (especially Lviv, Volhynia, Podolia, Vilnius, etc.) and central Poland moved into Silesia, particularly in Lower Silesia. Since the end of Communist rule in Poland, there have been calls for greater political representation for the Silesian ethnic minority. In 1997, a Katowice court of law registered the Union of People of Silesian Nationality (ZLNS) as the political representative organization of the Silesian ethnic minority, but after two months, the registration was revoked by a regional court.

According to M.E. Sharpe, Silesians inhabiting Poland are considered to belong to a Polish ethnographic group, and they speak a dialect of Polish. United States Immigration Commission also counted Silesian as one of the dialects of Polish. As a result of German influence, Silesians have been influenced by German culture. Many German and their descendants who inhabited both Lower and Upper Silesia have been displaced to Germany in 1945-47.

== Language ==
The Slavic Silesian language (often called Upper Silesian) is spoken by the Silesian Ethnographic group inside Polish Upper Silesia. According to the last census in Poland (2021), some 467,145 people declared Silesian to be their native language; however, as many as 596,224 people declared themselves to be of Silesian nationality, not necessarily speaking Silesian, even though the Silesian nationality has not been recognized by Polish governments since its creation in 1945.

There is some contention over whether Silesian is a dialect or a language in its own right. Most Polish linguists consider Silesian to be a prominent regional dialect of Polish. However, many Silesians regard it to be a separate language belonging to the West Slavic branch of Slavic languages, together with Polish and other Lechitic languages. In July 2007, the Silesian language was officially recognized by the Library of Congress and SIL International. The language was attributed an ISO code: SZL. The first official dictation contest of the Silesian language took place in August 2007.

Although the German language is still spoken in Silesia, as it has a sizable minority of speakers in the Opole Voivodship in Poland, the vast majority of native speakers were expelled during or after 1945. Therefore, the number of German speakers in the region was radically and significantly decreased after World War II, even though the Germans had settled there for centuries. The Silesian German dialect is a distinct variety of East Central German, with some West Slavic influence likely caused by centuries of contact between Germans and Slavs in the region; the dialect is related to contemporary Saxon in some ways. The Silesian German dialect is often misleading referred to as Lower Silesian in the German language. The usage of this dialect is drastically declining because most speakers, expelled by 1946 at the latest, are now over 80 years old or have already died, and their descendants in West or East Germany had no social opportunities to acquire the dialect within a standard German environment.

== Historical data ==
=== Prussian Lower Silesia ===
In year 1819, the Breslau Regency had 833,253 inhabitants, the majority of whom—755,553 (90%)—were German-speakers; with a Polish-speaking minority numbering 66,500 (8%); as well as 3,900 Czechs (1%) and 7,300 Jews (1%). The Liegnitz Regency was inhabited by Germans with a small Sorbian minority.

Table 1. Ethno-linguistic structure of Prussian Silesia in early 19th century (1800–1825)
Ethnic group	acc. G. Hassel	%	acc. S. Plater	%	acc. T. Ładogórski	%
Germans	1,561,570	75.6	1,550,000	70.5	1,303,300	74.6
Poles	444,000	21.5	600,000	27.3	401,900	23.0
Sorbs	24,500	1.2	30,000	1.4	900	0.1
Czechs	5,500	0.3			32,600	1.9
Moravians	12,000	0.6				
Jews	16,916	0.8	20,000	0.9	8,900	0.5
Population	c. 2.1 million	100	c. 2.2 million	100	c. 1.8 million	100

=== Prussian Upper Silesia ===
The earliest exact census figures on ethnolinguistic or national structure (Nationalverschiedenheit) of the Prussian part of Upper Silesia, come from year 1819. The last pre-WW1 general census figures available, are from 1910 (if not including the 1911 census of school children—Sprachzählung unter den Schulkindern—which revealed a higher percent of Polish-speakers among school children than the 1910 census among the general populace). Figures (Table 1.) show that large demographic changes took place between 1819 and 1910, with the region's total population quadrupling, the percent of German-speakers increasing significantly, and that of Polish-speakers declining considerably. Also the total land area in which Polish language was spoken, as well as the land area in which it was spoken by the majority, declined between 1790 and 1890. Polish authors before 1918 estimated the number of Poles in Prussian Upper Silesia as slightly higher than according to official German censuses.

Table 1. Numbers of Polish, German and other inhabitants (Regierungsbezirk Oppeln)
Year	1819	1828	1831	1834	1837	1840	1843	1846	1852	1855	1858	1861	1867	1890	1900	1905	1910
Polish	377,100 (67.2%)	418,837 (61.1%)	443,084 (62.0%)	468,691 (62.6%)	495,362 (62.1%)	525,395 (58.6%)	540,402 (58.1%)	568,582 (58.1%)	584,293 (58.6%)	590,248 (58.7%)	612,849 (57.3%)	665,865 (59.1%)	742,153 (59.8%)	918,728 (58.2%)	1,048,230 (56.1%)	1,158,805 (57.0%)	Census, monolingual Polish: 1,169,340 (53.0%) or up to 1,560,000 together with bilinguals
German	162,600 (29.0%)	255,483 (37.3%)	257,852 (36.1%)	266,399 (35.6%)	290,168 (36.3%)	330,099 (36.8%)	348,094 (37.4%)	364,175 (37.2%)	363,990 (36.5%)	366,562 (36.5%)	406,950 (38.1%)	409,218 (36.3%)	457,545 (36.8%)	566,523 (35.9%)	684,397 (36.6%)	757,200 (37.2%)	884,045 (40.0%)
Other	21,503 (3.8%)	10,904 (1.6%)	13,254 (1.9%)	13,120 (1.8%)	12,679 (1.6%)	41,570 (4.6%)	42,292 (4.5%)	45,736 (4.7%)	49,445 (4.9%)	48,270 (4.8%)	49,037 (4.6%)	51,187 (4.6%)	41,611 (3.4%)	92,480 (5.9%)	135,519 (7.3%)	117,651 (5.8%)	Total population: 2,207,981

=== Plebiscite in Prussian Upper Silesia ===
In the 1921 plebiscite, 40.6% of eligible voters (people over 20 years old – a minimum age that favoured the German-speaking population, whose median age was greater than that of Polish-speakers of Upper Silesia, according to censuses of 1900–1910) decided to secede from Germany and become Polish citizens. In total, over seven hundred towns and villages voted in favour of Poland, especially in the counties of Pszczyna, Rybnik, Tarnowskie Góry, Toszek-Gliwice, Strzelce Opolskie, Bytom, Katowice, Lubliniec, Zabrze, Racibórz, Olesno, Koźle and Opole.

== See also ==
- Silesian Uprisings
- List of people from Silesia
- People from Silesia by populated place
- Silingi

== Sources ==
- Plater, Stanisław (1825). Jeografia wschodniéy części Europy czyli Opis krajów przez wielorakie narody słowiańskie zamieszkanych : obejmujący Prussy, Xsięztwo Poznańskie, Szląsk Pruski, Gallicyą, Rzeczpospolitę Krakowską, Krolestwo Polskie i Litwę [Geography of the Eastern Part of Europe, or Description of the Countries inhabited by Various Slavic Nations: Including Prussia, the Duchy of Posen, Prussian Silesia, Galicia, the Republic of Cracow, the Kingdom of Poland, and Lithuania] (in Polish). Wrocław: Wilhelm Bogumił Korn.
