= Silesian =

Silesian as an adjective can mean anything from or related to Silesia. As a noun, it refers to an article, item, or person of or from Silesia.

Silesian may also refer to:

== People and languages ==
- Silesians, inhabitants of Silesia, either a West Slavic (for example Ślężanie), or Germanic people (Schlesier or Silingi)
- Silesian language, West Slavic language/dialect
- Silesian German language, a German dialect

== Political divisions ==
- Province of Silesia, 1815–1919 and 1938 to 1941, a province of Prussia within Germany
- Silesian Voivodeship (1920–1939), an autonomous territorial unit of Poland (1920–1939)
- Silesian Voivodeship, a present-day division of Poland (see also Lower Silesian Voivodeship)
- Moravian-Silesian Region, a present-day division of Czech Republic

== Other ==
- Silesian (series), a European subdivision of the Carboniferous period of the geological timescale
- Silesian horse

== See also ==
- Silesia (disambiguation)
- Upper Silesian (disambiguation)
- Lower Silesian (disambiguation)
- Schlesinger
- Angelus Silesius, a baroque mystic from Silesia
