= Silesians (tribe) =

West Slavic tribe

Map of the tribes of Silesia of the 9th and 10th centuries; Silesians in the centre

The Silesians (Polish: Ślężanie) were one of the geographical and cultural groupings known today as the Polish tribes, inhabiting territories of Lower Silesia, near Mount Ślęża and the Ślęza river, on both banks of the Oder, up to the area of modern city of Wrocław. They were the first permanent inhabitants of the site of Wrocław where they build a fort on Ostrów Tumski in the 9th century or earlier, which, at the time, was a river island.

== Etymology ==
Their tribal name was derived from the name of the mountain and the river, which most likely came from the old Polish word Ślagwa, meaning "humid", which refers to the climate of the area. The name of the region in turn, Silesia, comes from their language and tribal name. Along with the Opolans, the Ślężanie comprised one of the two major tribes in Silesia. They bordered the Dadosesani to their north. The territory of the Besunzane lay to the west. Other, more minor, Silesian tribes of the time included the Golensizi, Trebouane (who might have actually been part of the Ślężanie), the Bobrans (who were probably subjects of the Dziadoszanie) and the Głubczyce, further to the south.

== Historical sources ==
The Bavarian Geographer, which refers to them as the Sleenzane, states that they had 15 settlements, or gords (civitates), and lists them as one of several tribes located in Silesia. The Prague charter (description of borders of the Prague bishopric) from 1086 refers to them with the alternative name of Zlasane. Thietmar's Chronicle, from the second decade of the 11th century, calls them the Silensi. Their tribal name was known to the Franks and the Byzantines.

== Society and geography ==
The Ślężanie achieved a high degree of social organization and built fortified towns by the 8th century, if not earlier. Archaeological finds of fortifications built by various Silesian tribes date back to as early as 4th century and evidence of continuous settlement in the area can be traced back to 1st century AD.

A long fortified wall, strengthened by numerous moats, stretched from the present day town of Jelenia Góra to Krosno Odrzańskie, and along both sides of the Bobr river. The existence of these sophisticated defenses suggests that the various Silesian tribes had to cooperate in their construction. Hence, it is possible that in the period between the 7th and 9th centuries, the Ślężanie were united in a loose confederation of Silesian tribes. However, the wall most likely served a solely defensive purpose, most likely as a bulwark against raiding parties of the neighboring Polabian Slavs as none of the Polish tribes yet shared direct borders with Germanic states at the time.

The mountain Ślęża, and the neighboring peak of Sępia Góra ("Vulture Peak"), served as a sacred place where important religious ceremonies were held by the tribe. In fact, the religious importance of the location dates back to the sun-worshipping people of the Lusatian culture, as early as 1300 B.C. It was used as a place of worship by various people who inhabited the area before the Ślężanie, for example, the Silingi (most likely a Vandal tribe).

== Conquest ==
From 990 AD onwards, after a series of short wars between Mieszko I of the Piast dynasty, the first ruler of the early Polish state, and Boleslaus II, Duke of Bohemia of the Přemyslid dynasty (who was Mieszko's brother in law), Silesia, and its tribes, became part of the Polish state. Over time, the Ślężanie, along with the other Silesian tribes, as well as the Vistulans, Pomeranians, Lendians, Masovians and the Polans mixed and became part of the Polish state.

== See also ==
- List of Medieval Slavic tribes
