= Silesian tribes =

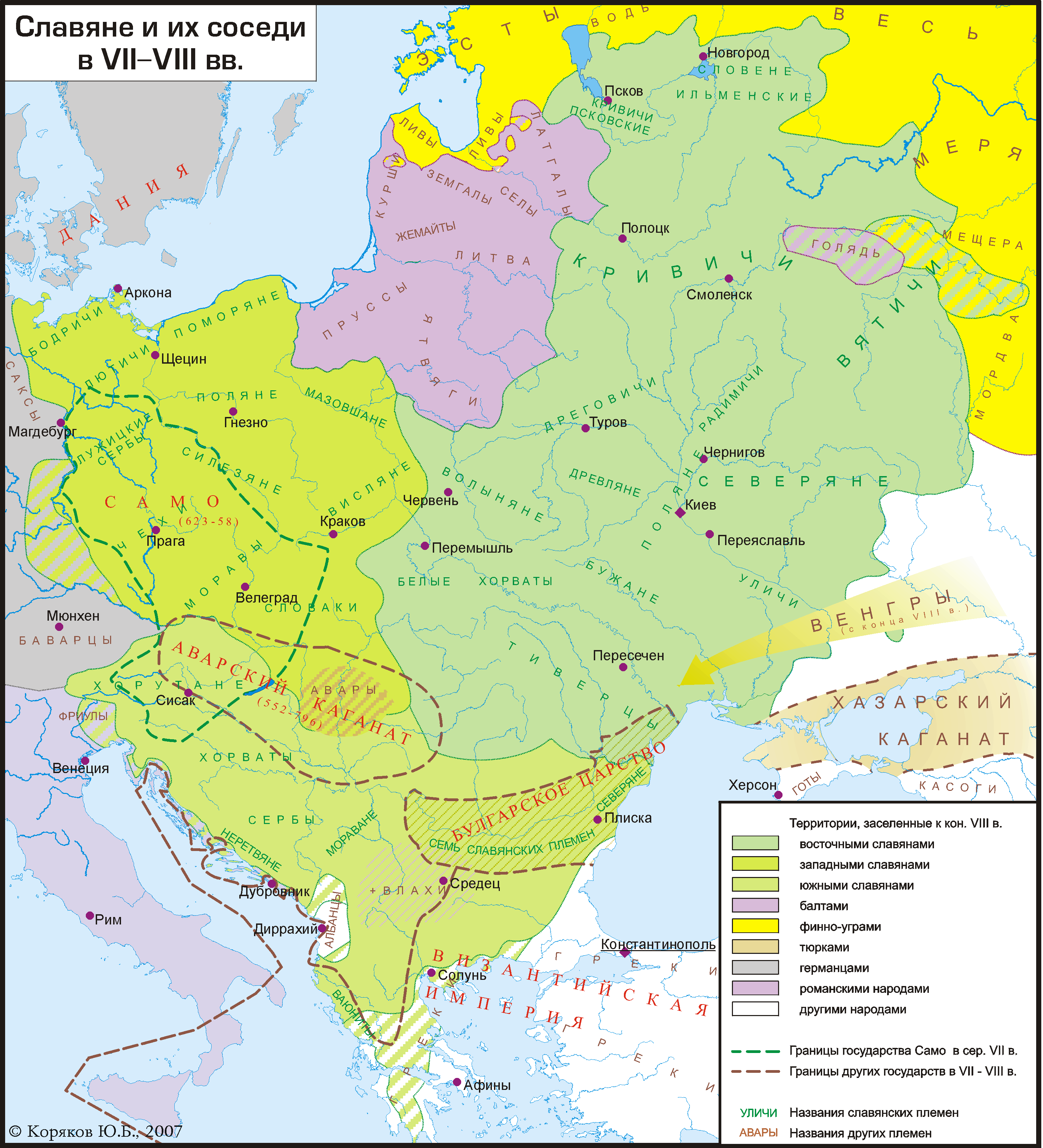

The Silesian tribes (Polish: plemiona śląskie) is a term used to refer to tribes, or groups of West Slavs that lived in the territories of Silesia in the Early Middle Ages. The territory they lived on became part of Great Moravia in 875 (now mostly in the Czech Republic) and later, in 990, the first Polish state created by duke Mieszko I and then expanded by king Boleslaw I at the beginning of the 11th century. They are usually treated as part of the Polish tribes and sometimes as part of the Germanic tribes. Two tribes among them are sometimes considered as Czech (Moravian) tribes.

== History ==
Before and during the migration period the territory of south west Poland - Silesia - was inhabited by various peoples. It included Celts and probably some Germanic tribes - among them - the Silingi. Tacitus in his description of Magna Germania mentions Suevi: Marsigni, Osi, Gotini, Buri in what later became Silesia and Burgundiones and Lygii at the Vistula.

However, during the migration period, those peoples had moved west and vacated territories in Central Europe. Lands in the basins of Oder and Vistula were then taken by Polish tribes who repopulated these abandoned areas and created their own tribal organizations. The Silesian tribes, together with the Polans, Masovians, Vistulans and Pomeranians were the most important Polish tribes. These five tribes "shared fundamentally common culture and language and were considerably more closely related to one another than were the Germanic tribes."

Eventually the Silesian tribes, together with other Polish tribes, formed what is now Polish ethnicity and culture. This process is called ethnic consolidation in which several ethnic communities of kindred origin and cognate languages, merge into a single one.

The tribal differences started to disappear after the unification of Poland in the 10th and 11th centuries. The main factors of these process were the establishment of a single monarchy that ruled over all Polish tribes as well as creation of a separate ecclesiastical organization within the boundaries of the newly established Polish state. In the course of the 12th century the remaining tribal differences within regions were almost entirely gone. The names of the smaller tribes disappear from the annals of history as well as the names of some prominent tribes (Vistulans, Polans). However, in some places, names of the most important tribes transform into names of the whole regions (Mazovians for Mazovia, Silesians for Silesia). As a result of the fragmentation of Poland some of those regions were again divided into smaller entities (e.g. Silesia into Lower Silesia and Upper Silesia), however the tribal era was already over and these divisions reflected only political subdivisions of the Polish realm.

== List of Silesian tribes ==
- Besunzane (Bieżuńczanie), Bavarian Geographer
- Dadosesani (Dziadoszanie), Bavarian Geographer
- Golenzizi (Golęszyce), Bavarian Geographer
- Opolini (Opolanie), Bavarian Geographer
- Sleenzane (Ślężanie), Bavarian Geographer
- Bobrzanie
- Lubuszanie
- Trzebowianie
- Lupiglaa

== See also ==
- Silings, Germanic tribe of Silesia
