= Lechites =

Speakers of Lechitic West Slavic languages in the region of Poland

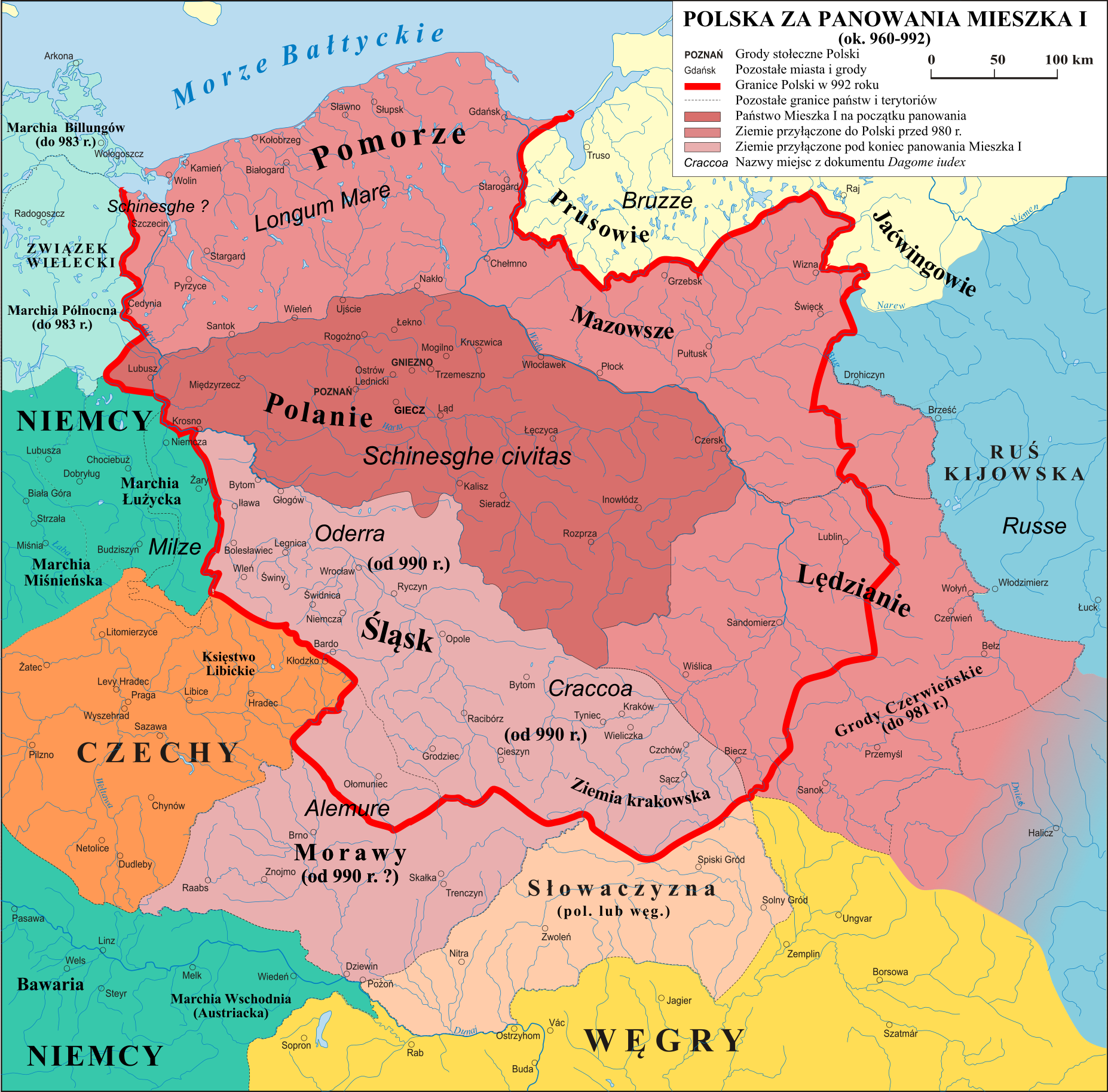
Poland under Mieszko's rule between ca. 960–992, encompassing most of the Lechitic tribes within its borders

Lechites (Polish: Lechici, German: Lechiten), also known as the Lechitic tribes (Polish: Plemiona lechickie, German: Lechitische Stämme), is a name given to certain West Slavic tribes who inhabited modern-day Poland and eastern Germany, and were speakers of the Lechitic languages. Distinct from the Czech–Slovak subgroup, they are the closest ancestors of ethnic Poles and of Pomeranians, Lusatians and Polabians.

== History ==
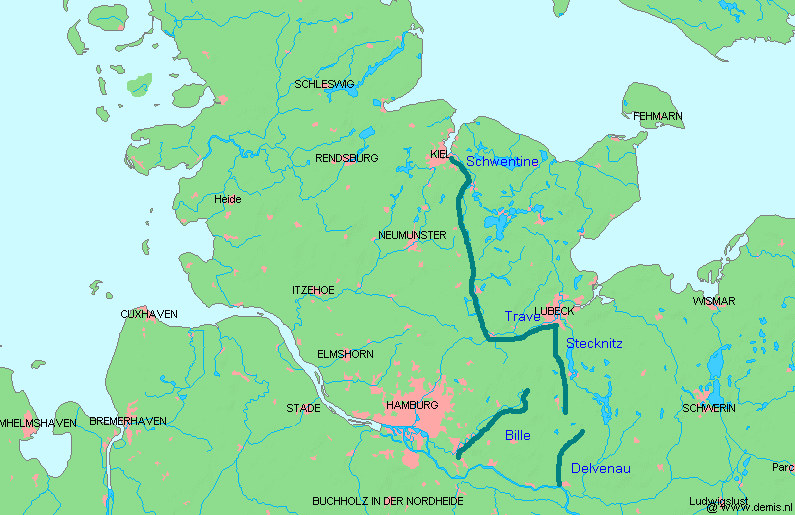
The Limes Saxoniae border between the Saxons and the Lechitic Obotrites, established about 810 in present-day Schleswig-Holstein

According to Polish legend, Mieszko I inherited the ducal throne from his father who probably ruled over two-thirds of the territory inhabited by eastern Lechite tribes. He united the Lechites east of the Oder (Polans, Masovians, Pomeranians, Vistulans, Silesians) into a single country of Poland. His son, Bolesław I the Brave, founded the bishoprics at Wrocław, Kołobrzeg, and Kraków, and an archbishopric at Gniezno. Bolesław carried out successful wars against Bohemia, Moravia, Kievan Rus' and Lusatia, and forced the western Pomeranians to pay Poland a tribute. Shortly before his death Bolesław became the first King of Poland in 1025.

=== Lechitic languages ===
The West Slavs included the ancestors of the peoples known later as Poles, Pomeranians, Czechs, Slovaks, Sorbs and Polabians. The northern so-called Lechitic group includes, along with Polish, endangered Pomeranian and Polabian, a dead language; Silesian, which is variously considered a Polish dialect or a language in its own right, is also part of this group. The Sorbian languages of the southern part of the Polabian area, preserved as relics today in Upper and Lower Lusatia, occupy a place between the Lechitic and Czech-Slovak groups.

== The name Lech ==
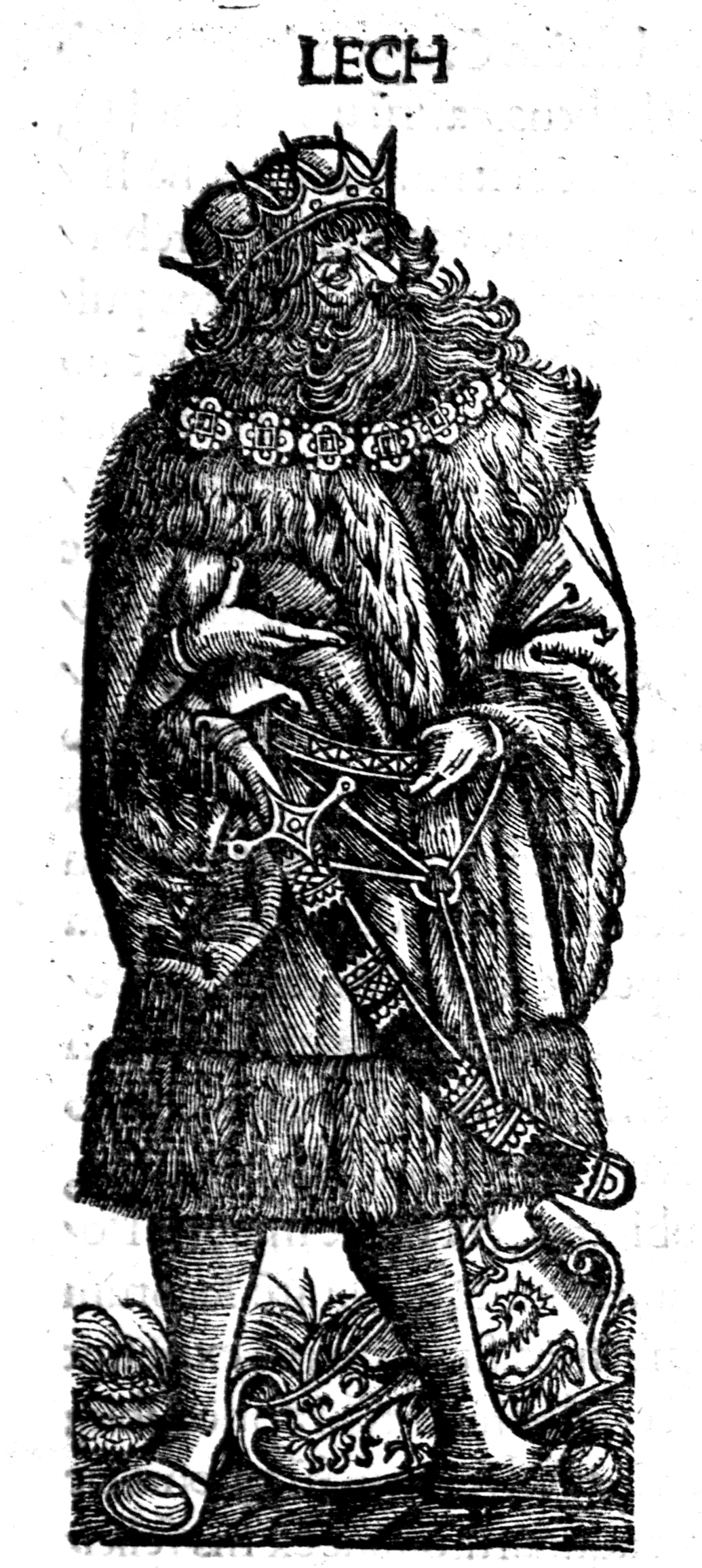
Depiction of the legendary ruler Lech in Chronica Polonorum by chronicler Maciej Miechowita (Matthias de Miechow)

The name Lech or Leszek, Lestko, Leszko, Lestek, and Lechosław is a very popular name in Poland. Lech was a popular male name among members of Piast dynasty like Lestko, Leszek I the White, Leszek II the Black, Leszek, Duke of Masovia, Leszek of Racibórz. The oldest part of Gniezno, in the center of Great Poland, is known as Wzgórze Lecha ("Lech's Hill") as well as Góra Królewska ("Royal Hill").

Lestko (also Lestek, Leszek), mentioned in the Gesta principum Polonorum, completed between 1112 and 1118 by Gallus Anonymus, was the second legendary duke of Poland and the son of Siemowit, born ca. 870–880. The Res gestae saxonicae sive annalium libri tres chronicle of 10th-century Germany, written by Widukind of Corvey, noted that Mieszko I (son of Siemomysł and grandchild of Lestek), ruled over the tribe called the Licicaviki, who lived in what is now Poland and were known as "Lestkowici" - the tribe of Lestek identified by the historians with the Lendians.

Wincenty Kadłubek in Chronica seu originale regum et principum Poloniae (Chronicles of the Kings and Princes of Poland), written between 1190 and 1208, used the names Lechitae (Lechites), lechiticus (lechitic) and Lechia many times to describe all of medieval Poland. Chronicle of Greater Poland 1273 described Casimir I the Restorer as "king of Poles means Lechites". Both the names "Poles" and "Lechites" were used in medieval Poland as adequate terms. "Laesir is the Old Norse term for the Ljachar, a people near the Vistula in Poland". Different forms of the name Lechia to designate the Polish state persist in several European languages and in some languages of Central Asia and the Middle East: "Lehia" in Romanian, "Lahestân/لهستان" in Persian (and via borrowing from Persian: "Lehastan" in Armenian, and "Lehistan" in the Ottoman Turkish).

== Legends ==
In Polish literature Lech was also the name of the legendary founder of Poland. The legend describes three brothers, Lech, Čech, and Rus – who founded three Slavic nations: Poland (also known as Lechia), Bohemia (Čechy, now known as the Czech Republic), and Rus (Ruthenia). In this legend Lech was the founder of Gniezno.

Three brothers Lech, Czech and Rus were exploring the wilderness to find a place to settle. Suddenly they saw a hill with an old oak and an eagle on top. Lech said: this white eagle I will adopt as an emblem of my people, and around this oak I will build my stronghold, and because of the eagle nest (Polish: gniazdo) I will call it Gniezdno (modern: Gniezno). The other brothers went further on to find a place for their people. Czech went to the South (to found the Czech Lands) and Rus went to the East (to create Rus').

A variant of this legend, involving only two brothers Lech and Čech, was first written down by Cosmas of Prague of Bohemia. The legend was described by Kronika wielkopolska ("Greater Poland Chronicle"), written in 1273 in Latin, and Chronicle of Dalimil, written in Czech in 1314.

== See also ==
- Lech (disambiguation)
- Lechia
- Lendians
- Polish tribes
- Sorbs
- Lechitic languages
