= Silesian Przesieka =

Forested area in the middle of Silesia

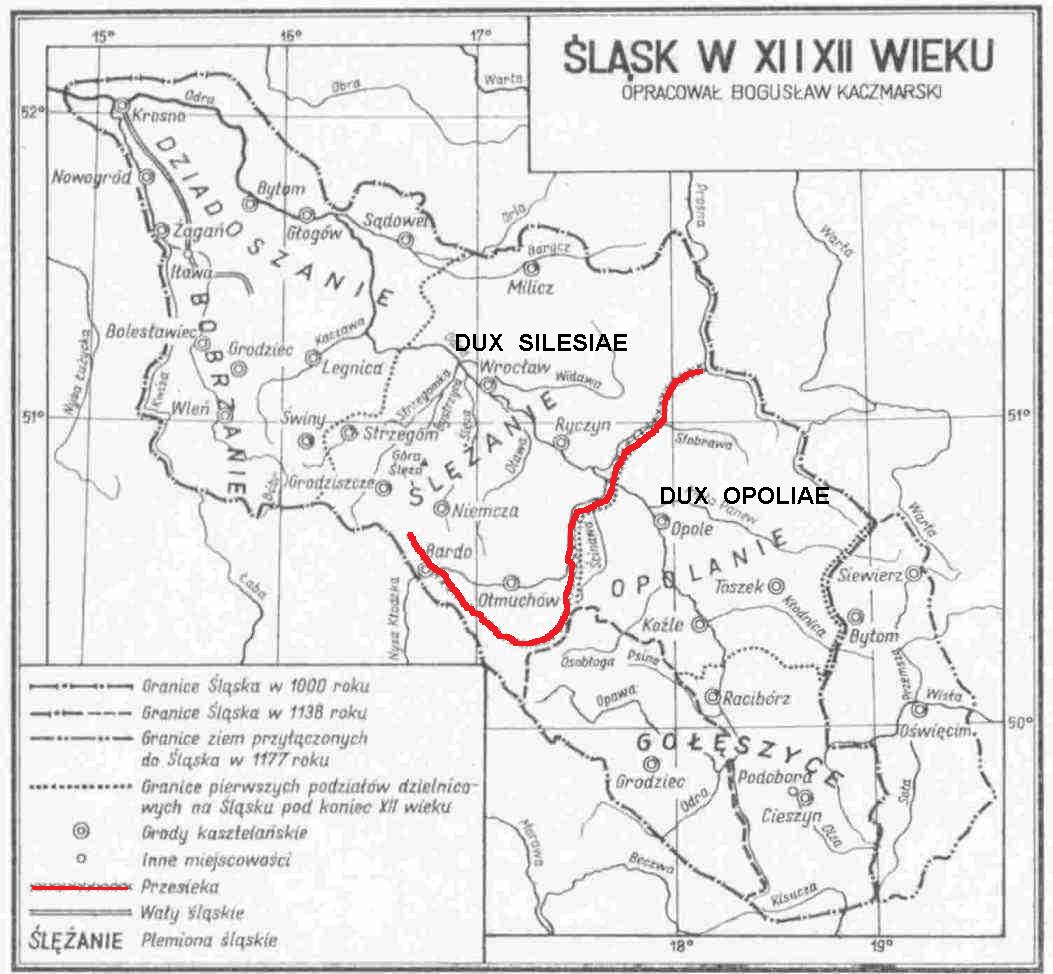
Silesian Cutting

Silesian Przesieka, literally Silesian Cutting (Polish: Przesieka Śląska or Oseg, Silesian: Ślůnske Uodćyńće, German: Schlesischer Grenzwald, Hag or Preseka, Latin: Indago) was a densely forested, uninhabited and unpassable strip of land in the middle of Silesia, spreading from Golden Mountains in the south, along the Nysa Kłodzka to the Odra, and then along the Stobrawa, reaching the towns of Namysłów and Byczyna in northern Silesia. Originally, the Silesian Cutting was a boundary, separating territories of two Western Slavic tribes, the Slezanie and the Opolanie. In the 12th century, along the Cutting a border of Lower Silesia and Upper Silesia was established.

For a long time, the Silesian Cutting was used as a natural military obstacle, protecting the area of Opole from raids of the Moravian and Czech tribes. However, it did not prevent the Hussites from invading Silesia in 1420 (see also Hussite Wars).

== Structure ==
The Silesian Przesieka was a wide, uninhabited border forest, strengthened on the inside by cut-down trees whose branches were twisted together, with thick bushes and sometimes ramparts and trenches from the 8th–9th century blocking movements from the west. Gates, which could be closed in dangerous times, controlled all roads leading outwards. The Przesieka was maintained by local Polish peasants and used in their self-defence. If a settlement expanded in size the fortifications were moved outwards. Placenames like Osiek, Ossig, Hag, Hänchen Przesieka, Lower Silesian Voivodeship or Przesieka, Podlaskie Voivodeship commemorated these unique natural circumstances.

== Geographic distribution ==
Starting at Namysłów and Byczyna, the main Lower Silesian Przesieka (Preseka) comprised the area of Kluczbork, today's woodland between the rivers Stobrawa and Mała Panew and ended at the Silesian Muschelkalk ridge. The fortification continued on the other side of the Oder at the Niemodlin woodland, incorporated the woods to the right of the Nysa Kłodzka and the Golden and Owl Mountains. From there the cutting turned northeast and incorporated the Sudetes, which separated Silesia and Bohemia, including the foothills on a distance of 80 kilometers. The Przesieka continued up to the Lower Silesian heathland, the border to Lusatia, a region which was especially well fortified by three trenches (German: Dreigräben) and a passage to the west of Szprotawa. From the Bóbr knee the Cutting incorporated the woodlands of Zielona Góra and eastwards the border forests between Silesia and Greater Poland. At the river Barycz the Cutting turned south to close the circle around Lower Silesia.

The distribution of the Upper Silesian border forests is relatively unknown. Only the western Preseka at Hrubý Jeseník and its foothills, the woodlands of the northern Carpathian Mountains and the Moravian Gate as well as at the woodlands of the Polish Jura are established. This enclosed area was divided into two chambers by a border zone. This inner Przesieka is in parts preserved until today, visible at the upper Malapane and between Rybnik and Pszczyna. Equally unknown in detail is the division of the Lower Silesian region, which was also partitioned into small chambers divided by strips of woodland.

== Impact of German Ostsiedlung ==
Town-like settlements already existed before the Ostsiedlung, as craftsmen and merchants formed suburbs of fortified strongholds (burg(h)s, castra). Usually, Slavic marketplaces were set at an open range with few or no permanently inhabited buildings and, after Christianization, a church. Market fields (ring, rynek) were near fortified strongholds. This system was borrowed from 10th century East Francia and persisted in the Slavic regions until the Ostsiedlung. As the Silesian dukes initiated the German Ostsiedlung the border forests offered the chance to plan irrespective of older settlements. This approach was started by Henry I in the late 12th century, and soon other noble and clerical landlords competitively followed his example. The German settlers cleared the forests and thus destroyed the protective effect of the Preseka. To defend their now unprotected soil the Silesian dukes replaced the dissolving Preseka by a strip of villages, fortified towns and castles. The area became the center of the evolving society (Neustamm) of the German Silesians.
