= Polish tribes =

Lechite tribes that lived within the territory of Poland

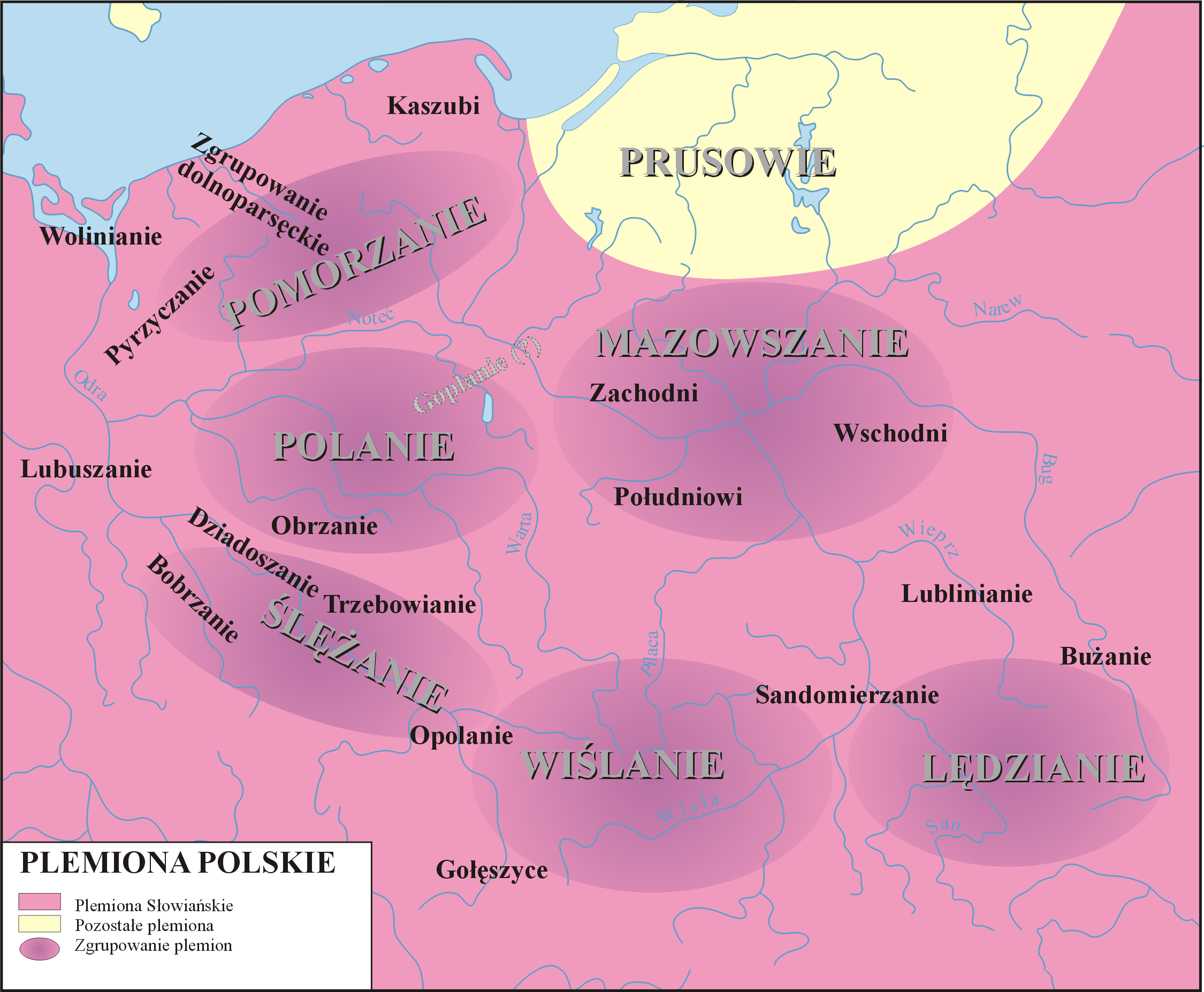
Map showing the approximate location of Polish tribes

"Polish tribes" is a term used sometimes to describe the tribes that lived from around the mid-6th century in the territories that became Polish with the creation of the Polish state by the Piast dynasty. The territory on which they lived became a part of the first Polish state created by duke Mieszko I and expanded at the end of the 10th century, enlarged further by conquests of king Bolesław I at the beginning of the 11th century.

In about 850 AD a list of peoples was written down by the Bavarian Geographer. Absent on the list are Polans, Pomeranians and Masovians, who became known later and were written about by Nestor the Chronicler in his Primary Chronicle (11th/12th century).

The most important tribes who were conquered by Polans were the Masovians, Vistulans, Silesians and Pomeranians. These five tribes "shared fundamentally common culture and language and were considerably more closely related to one another than were the Germanic tribes."

== Tribes ==
=== Listed by the Bavarian Geographer (c. 845) ===
The following tribes today identified as Polish are listed by the anonymous Bavarian Geographer, who wrote in the mid-9th century:

Latin name	Polish name	English name (if separate)	Amount of civitates
Glopeani	Goplanie	Goplans	400
Lendizi	Lędzianie	Lendians	98
Prissani	Pyrzyczanie		70
Velunzani	Wolinianie	Wolinians	70
Sleenzane	Ślężanie	Silesians	15
Dadosesani	Dziadoszanie or Dziadoszyce		20
Besunzane	Bieżuńczanie		2
Lupiglaa	Głubczyce (uncertain)		30
Opolini	Opolanie	Opolans	20
Golensizi	Gołęszycy		5

=== Listed in the Prague document (1086) ===
The Prague document lists the following tribes, located in Silesia:

Latin name	Polish name	English name (if separate)
Zlasane	Ślężanie	Silesians
Trebouane	Trzebowianie	
Poborane	Bobrzanie or Poobranie	Bobrans
Dedosize	Dziadoszanie or Dziadoszyce	

=== Other sources and tribes ===
Other sources include Thietmar's Chronicle, which mentions the Diedesisi or Diedesi (identified with the Dadosesani or Dziadoszanie), and the Cilensi or Silensi (identified with the Silesians). Widukind of Corvey mentions a tribe called Licikaviki in his work, The Deeds of the Saxons, thought to be the Lubuszans, or possibly the Lendians or Pomeranians. Furthermore, the following tribes have been identified through other sources or inference:

- Polans – mentioned in the Gesta Hammaburgensis ecclesiae pontificum and Chronica Slavorum
- Masovians – mentioned in the Primary Chronicle
- Pomeranians – mentioned in the Primary Chronicle

== See also ==
- Lechitic languages
- Polish language
