= Opolans =

Medieval Slavic tribe

Opolans (Polish: Opolanie; Czech: Opolané; German: Opolanen; Latin: Opolini) were the West Slavic tribe that lived in the region of upper Odra. Their main settlement (gord) was Opole. They were mentioned in the Bavarian Geographer, under the Latin name Opolini, as one of the seven tribes living in Silesia (Silesian tribes). The other six were: Dziadoszanie, Golęszyce, Ślężanie, Trzebowianie, Bobrzanie and Lupiglaa (often identified with Głubczyce).

Location of Silesian tribes in the 9th and 10th centuries

The name Opolans derives from a Slavic term opole, that meant a specific form of self-government used among the West Slavs. Early medieval opole transformed into an administrative governing form used in Early Medieval Poland mainly to collect taxes.

According to the Geographer Opolans possessed 20 gords in what was later known as Upper Silesia such as Opole and Toszek. Presumably their place of cult was the Saint Anna mountain. Opolanie's territories were conquered by Great Moravia in 875 and were probably incorporated into the Přemyslid Bohemia in the first half of the 10th century. In 990 Opolans' territories were incorporated into the first Polish state. Due to this fact they are usually treated as part of the Polish tribes.

== See also ==
- Silesian tribes
- Polish tribes
- Opole (administrative)
