= Silesia (disambiguation) =

Silesia is a historical region in Central Europe.

Historical territories of Silesia include:

- Silesia, split between Poland, Czech Republic and Germany
  - Lower Silesia, split between Poland and Germany
  - Upper Silesia, split between Poland and the Czech Republic
  - Czech Silesia (sometimes Moravian Silesia), in the Czech Republic
  - Austrian Silesia, in the former Austrian Empire and Kingdom of Bohemia
  - Cieszyn Silesia or Těšín Silesia, split between Poland and the Czech Republic
  - Middle Silesia, in Poland

Administrative units of Silesia include:

- Duchy of Silesia (1138–1335)
- New Silesia, former Prussian province (1795–1807)
- Province of Silesia, former Prussian province (1815–1919; 1938–1941)
  - Province of Lower Silesia, former Prussian province (1919–1938; 1941–1945)
  - Province of Upper Silesia, former Prussian province (1919–1938; 1941–1945)
- Duchy of Upper and Lower Silesia (Austrian Silesia), former Austrian kronland (1742–1919)
- Silesian Voivodeship (1920–1939) in Second Polish Republic
- Silesian Voivodeship (1945–1950) in People's Republic of Poland
- Lower Silesian Upper Lusatia, former Saxon district (1994–2008)
- Lower Silesian Voivodeship, in Poland (1999–)
- Silesian Voivodeship, in Poland (1999–)
- Opole Voivodeship, in Poland (1999–)
- Lubusz Voivodeship, in Poland (1999–)
- Moravian-Silesian Region, in the Czech Republic (2000–)

== Religious bodies ==
- Evangelical Church of Silesia, former Protestant united regional church body in Germany (1947–2004)
- Silesian Evangelical Church of Augsburg Confession, a Lutheran regional church body in the Czech Republic

== Other uses ==
- SS Silesia, several passenger and cargo ships
- Silesia (cloth) A fabric used for garment linings
- Silesia, Montana

== See also ==
- Silesian (disambiguation)
- Metropolis GZM
- Dukes of Silesia
- SMS Schlesien, a German battleship that served in both World Wars
- Schlesien (disambiguation)
- Silesia Euroregion
- Śląsk (disambiguation)
