= Śląsk (disambiguation) =

Śląsk is the Polish name of Silesia.

Śląsk may also refer to:

- Śląsk Song and Dance Ensemble
- Śląsk Świętochłowice
- Śląsk Wrocław
  - Śląsk Wrocław II
  - Śląsk Wrocław (basketball)
  - Śląsk Wrocław (handball)
  - Śląsk Wrocław (women)

== See also ==
- Silesia (disambiguation)
