= Schlesien (disambiguation) =

Schlesien is the German name for Silesia, an area in central Europe. This may also refer to:

- Landsmannschaft Schlesien, an organisation of Germans born in Lower and Upper Silesia, and their descendants
- SMS Schlesien, one of the five Deutschland-class battleships, built for the German navy in 1906
- Gauliga Schlesien, the highest football league in the region of Silesia (1933-1945)
- Ein Feldlager in Schlesien, a Singspiel in three acts by Giacomo Meyerbeer

== See also ==
- Silesia (disambiguation)
