= Opole (administrative) =

Historical unit of administration in Poland

The opole (Latin: vicinia) is a historical unit of administration in Poland. An opole was characterised by close geographical ties between a group of settlements and common legal responsibilities collectively affecting all of them. The institution of the opole predates the Kingdom of Poland, and began disappearing around the 13th to 15th centuries. It was the lowest unit of administration in the medieval Polish kingdom, subordinate to the castellany.

A particular opole would be named after its largest, capital settlement called czoło (a word commonly meaning "forehead"). Most notably, the term survived as a name of a major city in Poland, Opole, and is also associated with the Opolans tribe.

== History and function ==
The organization of the opole predates the first Polish state, the Kingdom of Poland. Opoles were characteristic of the Slavic tribes and had their genesis in ties between neighbourhoods. In the loose organizational structure of those times, the opole stood as an intermediate stage between an extended family and the wider tribe; Henryk Łowmiański refers to opoles as the "constituent units of the tribe". At first, depending on the density of inhabitants, an opole could cover an area of between few dozen to a few hundred square kilometers, with an average area of about 300 square kilometres (120 sq mi). Opoles would comprise both larger settlements and individual manors.

Opoles had several forms of collective responsibility; for example the members of the opole were required to pay certain taxes as a unit and perform services for the state (such as providing cattle or aiding in searches for fugitives). In some documents, the term opole would be used to refer to those obligations.

The close geographical ties between a group of settlements, and common legal responsibilities collectively affecting all of them, can be seen as the primary defining characteristics of an opole. However, Bardach notes that practically nothing is known about the internal organization of the opole. They were subordinate to the local castellany.

Opoles began disappearing around the 13th to 15th centuries. According to Bardach, the causes included a proliferation of settlements applying Magdeburg rights (German legal codes), and the advent of economic and judicial immunities among the feudal lords (nobility and clergy), which removed many settlements from the state's jurisdiction. Those processes accelerated around the time of the fragmentation of Poland (12th to 14th centuries). Opoles disappeared earliest in Silesia and Lesser Poland, and survived the longest in the Masovia region of east-central Poland.
