= Lower Silesian =

Lower Silesian may refer to:

- Lower Silesian language
- Lower Silesia
- Lower Silesian Railways
- Lower Silesian Voivodeship
- Province of Lower Silesia
