= Upper Silesian =

Upper Silesian may refer to:

- the West Slavic Silesian language (Upper Silesian language)
- a person from Upper Silesia
- a person from the former Prussian Province of Upper Silesia
