= Lendians =

Lechitic tribe in Lesser Poland

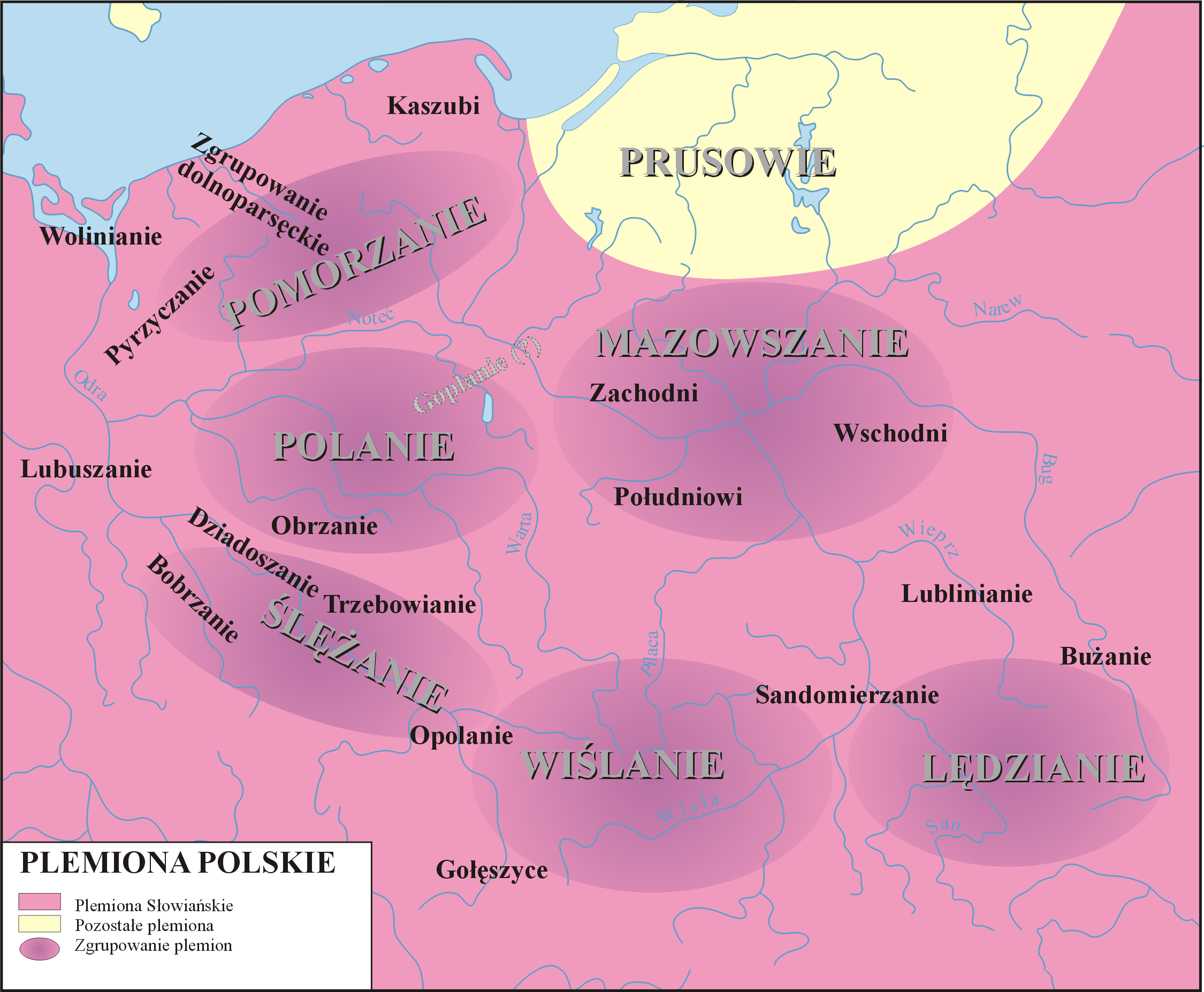
Map showing an approximation location of Polish tribes according to the Polish historiography — Lendians (Lędzianie) are found at the bottom-right corner

The Lendians (Polish: Lędzianie) were a Lechitic tribe who lived in the area of East Lesser Poland and Cherven Cities between the 7th and 11th centuries. Since they were documented primarily by foreign authors whose knowledge of Central and Eastern Europe geography was often vague, they were recorded by different names, which include Lendzanenoi, Lendzaninoi, Lz’njn, Lachy, Lyakhs, Landzaneh, Lendizi, Licicaviki and Litziki.

== Name ==
It is suggested that the name "Lędzianie" (*lęd-jan-inъ) derives from the word "lęda" of Proto-Slavic and Old Polish origin, meaning "slash-and-burn field".. Therefore it is suggested that the name of the tribe comes from their use of slash-and-burn agriculture, which involved cutting and burning of forests or woodlands to create fields. Accordingly, in this meaning Lendians were woodland-burning farmers, or "inhabitants of fields". Several European nations source their ethnonym for Poles, and hence Poland, from the name of Lendians: Lithuanians (lenkai, Lenkija) and Hungarians (Lengyelország).

Gerard Labuda notes that the Rus' originally called a specific tribal group settled around the Vistula river as the Lendians and only later in the 11th and 12th century started to apply the name of the tribe to the entire populace of the "Piast realm" because of their common language.

== Sources ==
Sources mentioning Lendians:

Bavarian Geographer (843) – Lendizi – (33) on the map
Josippon (Jewish chronicler), 890–953) – Lz’njn
Constantine VII (912–959) – Lendzanenoi, Lendzaninoi, Litziki
Al-Masudi (Arabian chronicler, c. 940) – Landzaneh
Widukind of Corvey (Saxon chronicler, 10th century) – Licicaviki
Nestor the Chronicler (Kievan Rus' chronicler, 11th century under the date of 981) – Lachy
Kinamos (Byzantine chronicler, 11th century) – Lechoi

In Latin historiography the Bavarian Geographer (generally dated to the mid-9th century) attests that Lendizi habent civitates XCVIII, that is, that the "Lendizi" had 98 gords, or settlements. The Lendians are mentioned, among others, by De administrando imperio (c. 959, as Λενζανηνοί), by Josippon (c. 953, as Lz’njn), by the Primary Chronicle (c. 981, as ляхи), by Ali al-Masudi (c. 940, as Landzaneh).

They are also identified to the Licicaviki from the 10th-century chronicle Res gestae saxonicae sive annalium libri tres by Widukind of Corvey, who recorded that Mieszko I of Poland (960–992) ruled over the Sclavi tribe. The same name is additionally considered to be related to the oral tradition of Michael of Zahumlje from DAI that his family originates from the unbaptized inhabitants of the river Vistula called as Litziki, and the recount by Thomas the Archdeacon in his Historia Salonitana (13th century), where seven or eight tribes of nobles, who he called Lingones, arrived from Poland and settled in Croatia under Totila's leadership.

== History ==
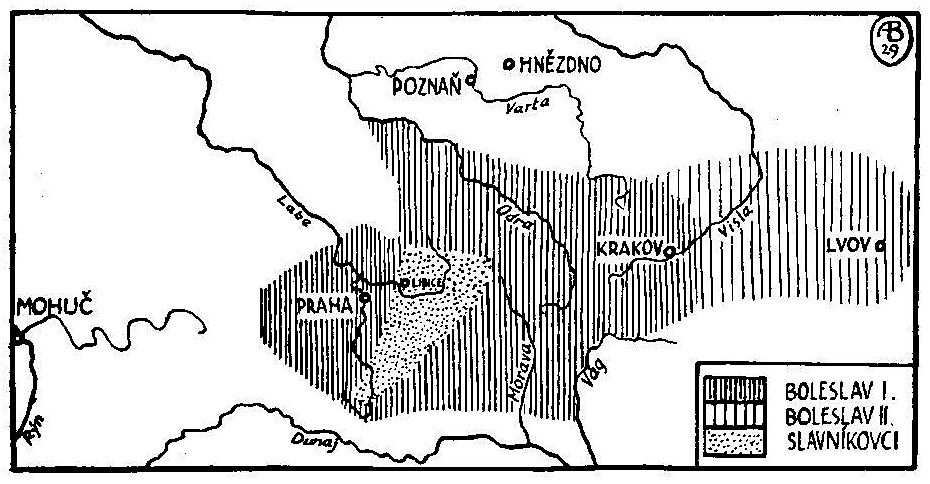
Cherven Cities as part of Bohemian lands during the reign of Boleslaus II, Duke of Bohemia (967/972–999).

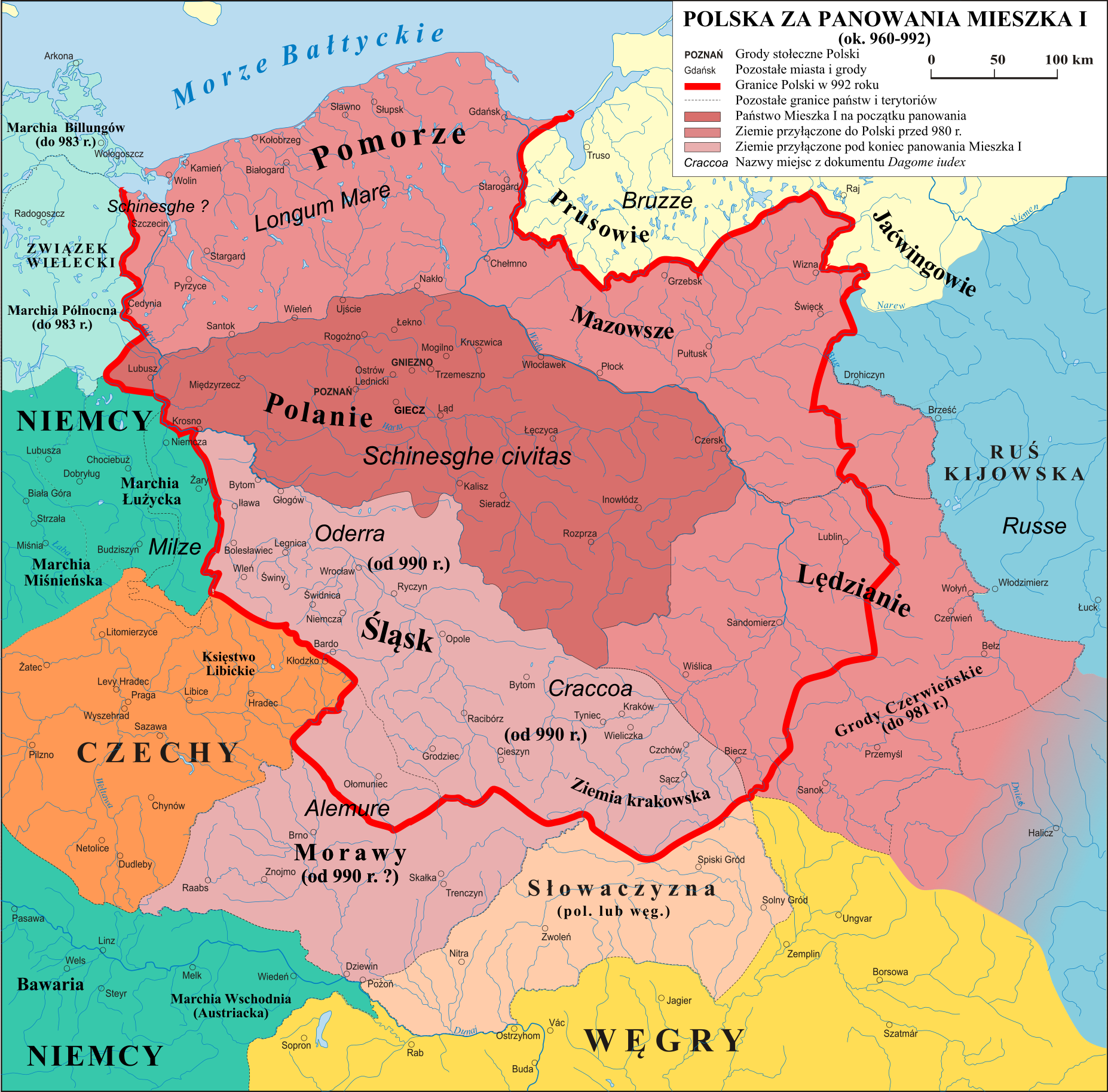
Cherven Cities, partly inhabited by the Lendians, as part of Poland under the rule of Mieszko I until 981 AD according to the Polish historiography.

The West Slavs (Lendians and Vistulans) moved into the area of present-day south-eastern Poland, during the early 6th century AD. Around 833, the region inhabited by the Lendians was incorporated into the Great Moravian state. Upon the invasion of the Hungarian tribes into the heart of Central Europe around 899, the Lendians submitted to their authority (Masudi). In the first half of the 10th century, they alongside Krivichs and other Slavic people paid tribute to Igor I of Kiev (DAI).

From the mid-950s onward, the Lendians were politically anchored in the Bohemian sphere of influence. Cosmas of Prague relates that the land of Kraków was controlled by the Přemyslids of Bohemia until 999. His report is buttressed by the foundation charter of the Archdiocese of Prague (1086), which traces the eastern border of the archdiocese, as established in 973, along the Bug and Styr (or Stryi) rivers. Abraham ben Jacob, who travelled in Eastern Europe in 965, remarks that Boleslaus II of Bohemia ruled the country "stretching from the city of Prague to the city of Kraków".

In the 970s, it is assumed that Mieszko I of Poland took over the region: the Primary Chronicle infers this when reporting that Volodymyr the Great conquered the Cherven Cities from the Lyakhs in 981: "Volodymyr marched upon the Lyakhs and took their cities: Peremyshl (Przemyśl), Cherven (Czermno), and other towns". Historian Leontii Voitovych speculates that if the lands were under control of the Duchy of Poland then the Kievan Rus' conquest would have been an open call for war between the principalities with an inevitable long struggle, but such a thing did not happen according to Voitovych, possibly indicating in Voitovych's view that the lands and its population weren't Polish, but an independent political-tribal union with some vassalage to Bohemia.

The region again fell under the Polish sphere of influence in 1018, when Bolesław I of Poland took the Cherven Cities on his way to Kiev. Yaroslav I the Grand Prince of Rus' reconquered the borderland in 1031. Around the year 1069, the region again returned to Poland, after Bolesław II the Generous retook the area and the city of Przemyśl, making it his temporary residence. Then in 1085, the region became a principality under Rus', and it remained part of Kievan Rus' and its successor state of Halych-Volhynia until 1340 when it was once again taken over by Kingdom of Poland under Casimir III of Poland. It is presumed that most of the Lendians were assimilated by the East Slavs, with a small portion remaining tied to West Slavs and Poland. The most important factors contributing to their fate were linguistic and ethnic similarity, influence of Kievan Rus' and Orthodox Christianity, deportations to central Ukraine by Yaroslav I the Wise after 1031 and colonization of their lands by Ruthenians fleeing west during Mongol assaults on Ruthenia during reign of Danylo of Halych.

== Tribal area ==
Constantine VII reports that in the year 944 Lendians were tributaries to the Kievan Rus' and that their monoxylae sailed under prince Wlodzislav downstream to Kiev to take part in the naval expeditions against Byzantium. This may be taken as an indication that the Lendians had access to some waterways leading to the Dnieper, e.g., the Styr River. According to Nestor the Chronicler and his account in Primary Chronicle, the Lendians (Lyakhs) inhabited the Cherven Cities, when in 981 they were conquered by Vladimir the Great. Based on Constantine's and Nestor's report, Gerard Labuda concludes that the Lendians occupied the area between the Upper Bug, Styr, and Upper Dniestr rivers in the east and the Wisłoka river in the west. This would indicate that through their land crossed an important route that connected Prague, Kraków, Kiev and the Khazars.

Polish historians Wojciech Kętrzyński, Stefan Maria Kuczyński, Janusz Kotlarczyk, and Jerzy Nalepa, among others, generally locate the Lendians in Upper San and Upper Dniester. Krzysztof Fokt advanced a viewpoint which claims that Lendians inhabited the whole of Western Ukraine (partly shared by D. E. Alimov), moving White Croats much further to the East in the direction of Vyatichi.

Henryk Łowmiański argued that the Lendians lived between Sandomierz and Lublin, and that with Vistulans even were tribal groups of White Croats. Leontii Voitovych also argues that the Lendians lived east of Vistulans and south of Mazovians, more specifically, in the area between Sandomierz and Lublin. Janusz Kotlarczyk considered that Red Ruthenia extended over a vast territory between Carpathian Mountains and Przemyśl on the south (inhabited by White Croats) and Volhinia on the north (partly inhabited by Lendians). Alexander Nazarenko considers that uncertainty of extant 10th-century descriptions of the upper Dniester and Bug River region makes it plausible to infer that the Lendians, White Croats and probably some other peoples shared this vast territory along the border of modern-day Ukraine and Poland.

According to Mykhailo Kuchynko, archaeological sources conclude that Prykarpattian region of Western Ukraine was not settled by West Slavic Lendians but East Slavic Croats, while the elements of material culture in early medieval sites alongside Upper San River in present-day Subcarpathian Voivodeship in Southeastern Poland show they belonged to East Slavic ethno-tribal affiliation. The early medieval sites near Dukla Pass, and villages Trzcinica and Przeczyca indicate that West Slavic material tradition started only at river Wisłoka, the right tributary of Upper Vistula.

== See also ==
- List of Medieval Slavic tribes
- Polish tribes
