= Vistulans =

Central European tribe

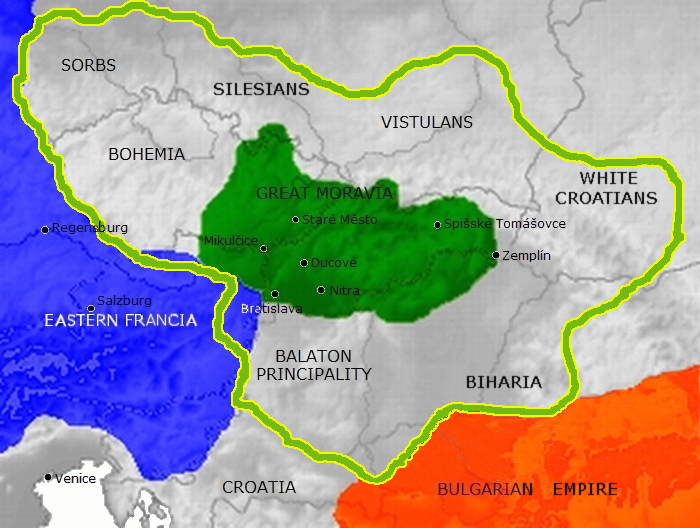
Central Europe in 870. Eastern Francia in blue, Bulgaria in orange, Great Moravia under Rastislav in green. The green line depicts the borders of Great Moravia after the territorial expansion under Svatopluk I (894). Note that some of the borders of Great Moravia are under debate

The Vistulans, or Vistulanians (Polish: Wiślanie), were an early medieval Lechitic tribe inhabiting the western part of modern Lesser Poland.

== Etymology ==
Their name derives from the hydronym of the river Vistula, meaning "inhabitants of Vistula"; the region is mentioned as Uuislane by the Bavarian Geographer, v Vislè and v Vislèh in the Vita Methodii, and Visleland by Alfred the Great in the 9th century.

== Identification ==
Even though some historians, such as Przemysław Urbańczyk, claim that the Vistulans did not exist, there are three documents from the 9th century which can be tied to this tribe. First is the so-called Vita Methodii or Pannonian Legend (The Life of St. Methodius), second is the Bavarian Geographer, and third is Alfred the Great's Germania. Scholars consider that the Vistulans could also have been mentioned in the Old English and Nordic epic poems. King Alfred's translation of Orosius contains a description of Europe which states be eastan Maroara londe is Wisle lond, ⁊ be eastan þæm sint Datia, þa þe iu wæron Gotan ('To the east of the Moravians' land is the Vistula land, and to the east of them are the Dacians, that formerly were Goths'.)

A verse in Old English poem Widsith (10th century):

Wulfhere sohte ic ond Wyrmhere; ful oft þær wig ne alæg,	I visited Wulfhere and Wyrmhere; there battle often raged,
þonne Hræda here heardum sweordum,	when the Hræda with their sharp swords,
ymb Wistlawudu wergan sceoldon	in the Vistula woods/wooden hills had to defend
ealdne eþelstol Ætlan leodum.	their ancestral seat against Attila's host.

It is considered that parts of the epic poem could be dated to the 6th century. The syntagma ymb Wistlawudu has seen different translations by the scholars depending on the consideration whether Wistla is a borrowing from a German, Latin, or Slavic language. As such *Wīstle could be identified with the people, while Wistlawudu interpreted as "by the Vistulan woods" or "by the Vistulan wooden hills" (Beskids and Western Carpathians). However, the Hræda which is genitive plural of *Hraede, gives further insight to the meaning and age of the poem. Although it is usually related with the Goths from the same poem (Hred-Gotum, Hreth-Gotan, Hreidhgotar), this verse is similar to the one in Hervarar saga ok Heiðreks (13th century), where prior the battle between Goths and Huns, Heidrek died in Harvaða fjöllum (Carpathian Mountains) which is sometimes translated as "beneath the mountains of Harvathi", considered somewhere beneath Carpathian Mountains near river Dnieper.

Tadeusz Lewicki argued that Anglo-Saxons, as in the case of Alfred the Great who called Croats Horithi, often distorted foreign Slavic names and it was not uncommon for the same Slavic tribe to be known by different names, in this case, Vistulans being another name for the White Croats. Henryk Łowmiański also argued that both the Vistulans and the Lendians were tribes of White Croats, but other scholars disagree. Leontii Voitovych believed that the Vistulans were the main tribe among those Silesian and Lechitic tribes who invaded this territory, dividing the Croatian lands into Eastern and Western parts.

Based on Lubor Niederle's thesis that the Vistulans are remnants of the once strong alliance of Croatian tribes which fell apart after the migration of the Croats to the Western Balkans in the 7th century, Tadeusz Lehr-Spławiński additionally noted that the name Vistulans was only known among Western Slavs and Germans, while in the East, in Byzantine and Arabian sources, the older name of Croats was retained for the same territory. Such an interpretation of the reference to ymb Wistlawudu ("in the Vistula woods") in the Anglo-Saxon poem Widsith argues that instead of 5th century events, the poem instead intended to refer to 6th century events contemporaneous with the Lombard king Alboin, when the Pannonian Avars led by Bayan I (Attila's people) expanded between 568 and 595 into the Pannonian Basin and extended their influence northward on the Slavs (Vistulans, Croats) in the Upper Vistula valley, seen in Avarian archaeological remains up to Gniezno in central-western Poland.

== History ==
Little is known about early history of the Vistulans. Their territory might have been conquered by Greater Moravia, though no conclusive evidence exists to prove this theory. According to archaeological findings, in the late 9th century several gords in southern Lesser Poland were destroyed. This might have been during the conquest of the Vistulans by Great Moravia, but it might have been the result of a conflict between the Vistulans and other tribes, like the Golensizi. In the 950s, the land of the Vistulans was probably conquered by Czech Duke Boleslaus I, which is confirmed by Abraham ben Jacob, whose work was used by Muslim geographer al-Bakri in his Book of Roads and Kingdoms.

It is not known when and how the land of the Vistulans joined into the state of the Polans. Archaeological research has not found any evidence of armed conflicts between the Polans and the Vistulans. Most likely, Bolesław I the Brave, future king of Poland, was named the ruler of Kraków by his grandfather, Boleslaus I. After the death of his father Mieszko I of Poland (992), Chrobry united Kraków with Poland, with the consent of the Vistulan ruling class.

So far historians have not been able to name any Vistulan dukes, but Vita Methodii does mention a "very powerful pagan prince settled on the Vistula" who "began mocking the Christians and doing evil" because of which was contacted by Saint Methodius who said it would be better to be baptized of one's own free will than as a prisoner in foreign land. Furthermore, little is known about their religious rituals and the date of baptism of the tribe. It was possibly around the same period, c. 874, when they were subjugated by king Svatopluk I of Moravia, and the Vistulan duke was forced to accept baptism.

== Territory ==
The area inhabited by the Vistulans probably ranged from the foothills of the Carpathian Mountains in the south, to the sources of the Pilica and Warta in the north. In the east, it reached the Dunajec, and in the west, the Skawa. The first Slavic gords were not built here until the mid 8th century, which means that the Vistulans probably frequently migrated, changing locations.

Since the 8th century, the Vistulans began construction of spacious gords, whose areas frequently reached over 10 hectares. Most gords were ring-shaped, and located on hills. Among major ones were the gords at Kraków, Stradów, Demblin, Naszczowice, Podegrodzie, Stawy, Trzcinica, Wiślica and on Bocheniec hill in Jadowniki. Most probably, the capital of the Vistulans was located in Kraków, which is confirmed by the size of the local gord, together with a fortified stronghold, located on the Wawel hill. Furthermore, the Vistulans probably built several mounds, such as the Krakus Mound, but historians argue whether these are of earlier, Celtic origin.

In the 9th century, they created a tribal state, with probable major centers in Kraków, Wiślica, Sandomierz, and Stradów. Probably around 874 they were subjugated by king Svatopluk I of Moravia, who was a contemporary of the emperor Arnulf. After a later period of Czech domination, the Vistulan lands became controlled by the Polans in the late tenth century, and were incorporated into Poland.

== See also ==
- List of medieval Slavic tribes
- Lechites

== Sources ==
- Majorov, Aleksandr Vyacheslavovich (2006). Velikaya Khorvatiya: Etnogenez i rannyaya istoriya slavyan Prikarpatskogo regiona Великая Хорватия: этногенез и ранняя история славян Прикарпатского региона [Great Croatia: Ethnogenesis and early history of the Slavs of the Carpathian region] (in Russian). St. Petersburg: St. Petersburg University Press. ISBN 5-288-03948-8.
- Voitovych, Leontii (2011). "Проблема "білих хорватів"". Галицько-волинські етюди (PDF). Біла Церква. ISBN 978-966-2083-97-2.
