= Polans (western) =

Early medieval Polish tribe

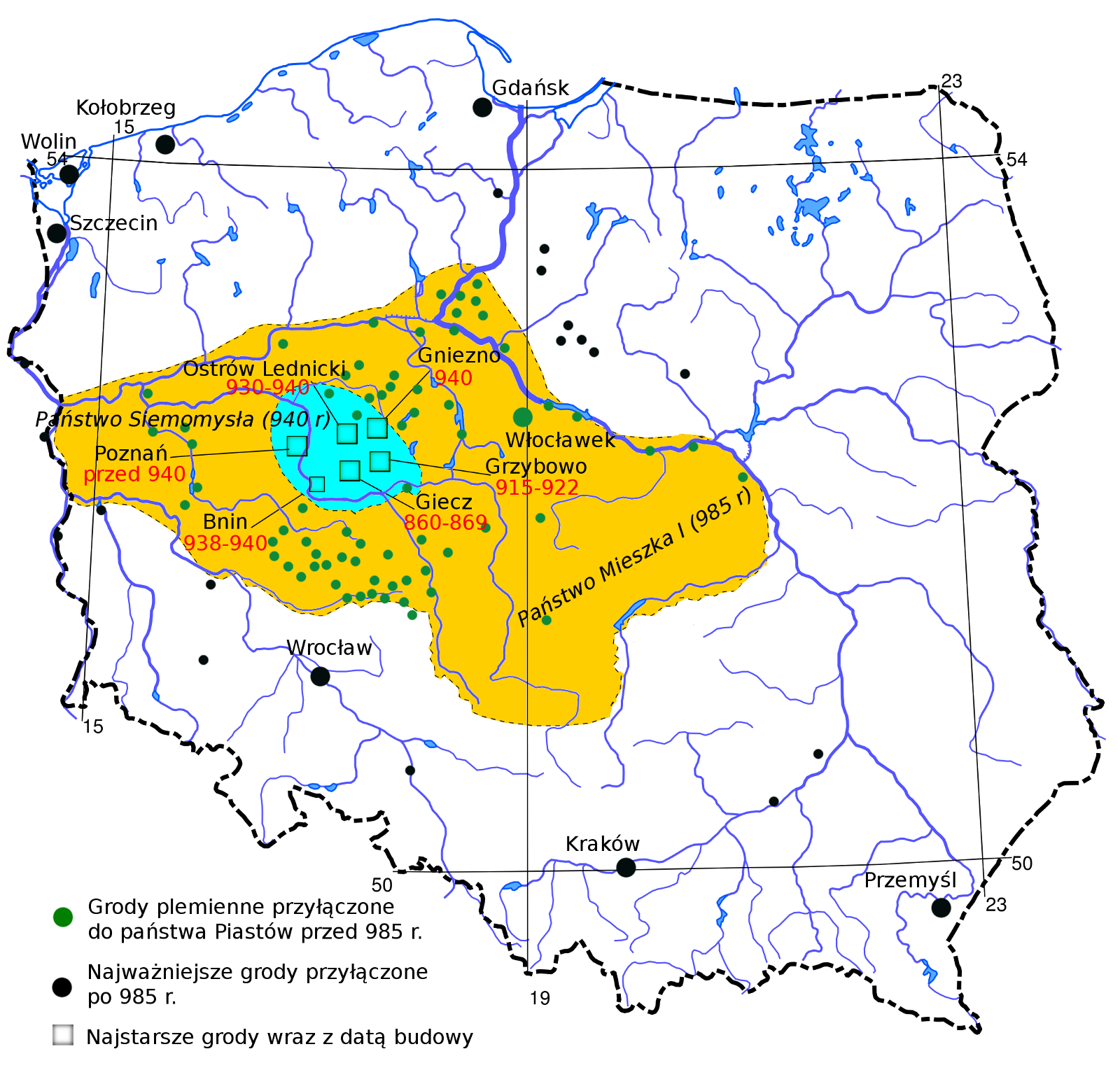
Extent of the Polan state of Mieszko I, and important Polan gord settlements

The Polans (Polish: Polanie) were allegedly one of the early medieval cultural and geographical groupings today referred to as the Polish tribes who inhabited the lakelands of Greater Poland and played an important role in the creation of the first Polish state during the reign of Mieszko I.

Modern historiography disputes the concept, as the term polanie is not well attested to the Early Middle Ages, and the oldest known mention dates to the reign of Bolesław I the Brave, found in the 10th century document Vita sancti Adalberti, which mentions "Bolizlav Polanorum duce".

== Etymology ==
The name of the modern-day nation of Poland derives from that of the Polans, who were the nation's central unifying force; the latter in turn likely derives from their primary aspect of their geography, economy, and community, the field. The members of a Polan opole sourced a majority of their income from and centred their society around the cultivated field. Aside from the first component of this name, Pol-, the component -anin is a Polish-language suffix designating a person's geographical, ethnic, or religious belonging. Zygmunt Gloger states the following regarding the etymology of the name of the Polans in his Geographic history of the ancient lands of Poland, published in 1903:

An increase in population among the Lechites who inhabited the lands around the Warta must have caused an early increase in the need for agriculture, i.e. the changing of forests into fields, hence the name Polans, or Polacy [the most common endonym for Poles]. This was described most accurately by Jan Długosz: "Lechites, especially those who sat on fields, were dubbed Polans by their compatriots who lived in the forests, and this name became so common among people that the old Lechite name disappeared into oblivion, and the nation and country began calling itself Polska". It is difficult to say exactly in which century this occurred. In any case, Marcin Kromer appears to be close to the truth, writing in the 16th century: "The name of the Poles only came into usage seven or eight hundred years ago." In our oldest sources, coming from the 10th century, the name of Poland is written in Latin: Polonia and Polenia, and Bruno of Querfurt, writing the biography of Saint Adalbert around 1000 A.D., calls the Poles: Polani, Poloni and Poloniani.

== Historical sources mentioning the Polans ==
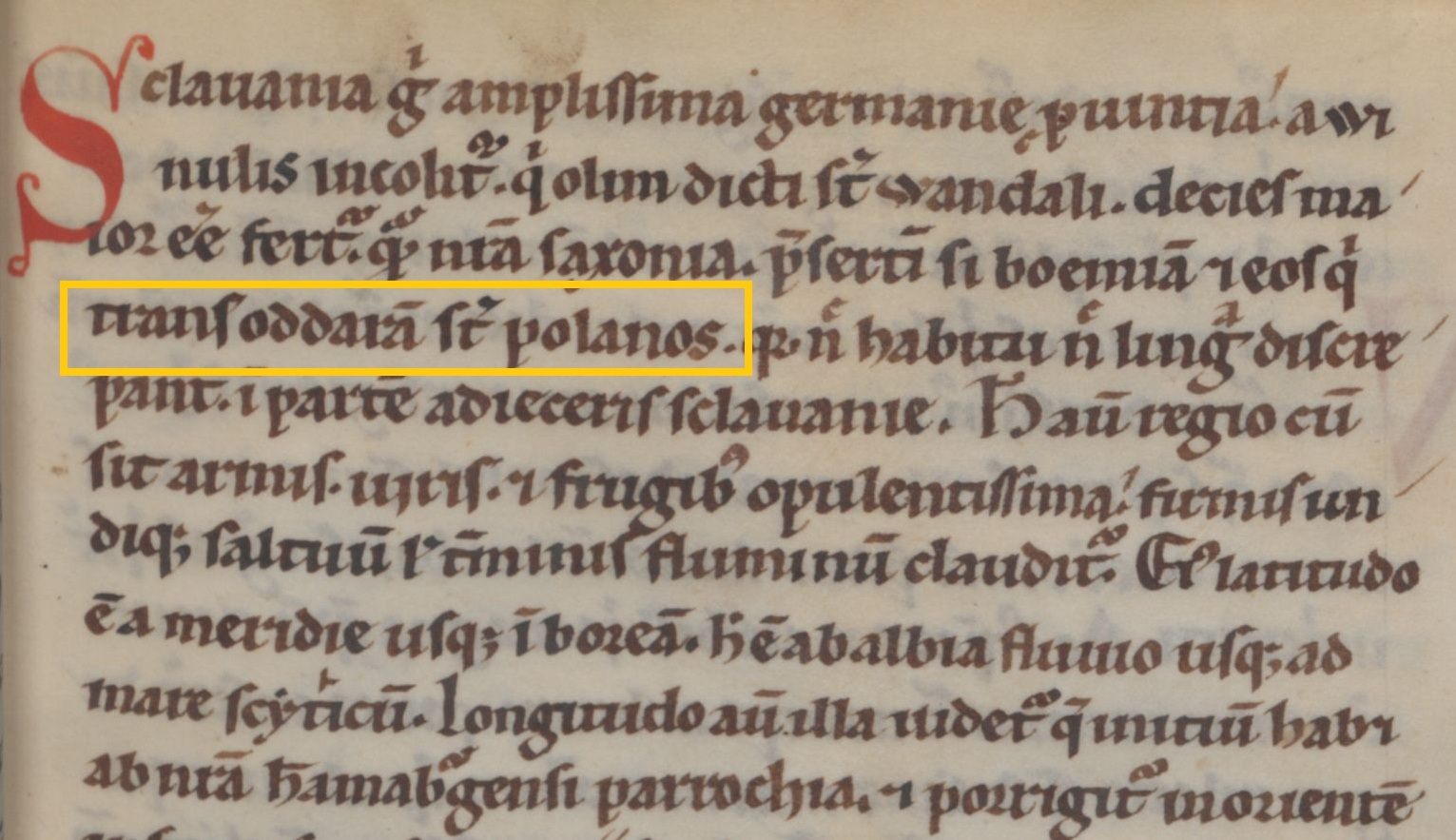
A fragment of the Gesta Hammaburgensis ecclesiae pontificum (1073) by Adam of Bremen containing the name Polans – Latin: trans Oddaram sunt Polanos, lit. 'across the Oder are the Polans'.

The name of the Polans first appears in a historical source at the end of the 10th century, in the first biography of Saint Adalbert, dated to 998–999, which mentions Bolizlav Polanorum duce in the context of the year 995; it is commonly translated as "Bolesław, duke of the Polans" or "duke of Poland". It is afterwards next mentioned in the Gesta Hammaburgensis ecclesiae pontificum, written from 1075 to 1080 by the chronicler Adam of Bremen. There, he mentions the Polans in a description of West Slavic tribal geography:

Along the shore of the river Oder, the Pomeranians firstly live, followed by the Polans, who border the Prussians and Czechs, as well as the Russes to the east.

Furthermore, the Polans are mentioned in passing with variable inflections elsewhere in the text, under names including Polonia and rege Polanorum Bolizlao. The next source for the early medieval Polans is the Chronica Slavorum, authored by Helmold:

The peoples occupying the shore of the Baltic Sea are plentiful in number. [...] Numerous peoples inhabit the lands around this sea: namely, the Danes and Swedes, who we call the Northmen, occupy the northern shore and all of the islands. The southern shore, meanwhile, is inhabited by Slavs; the first of them are the Russes; further are the Polans, who have the Prussians to their north, and the Czechs, as well as the Moravians, Carantanians, and Sorbs to their south.

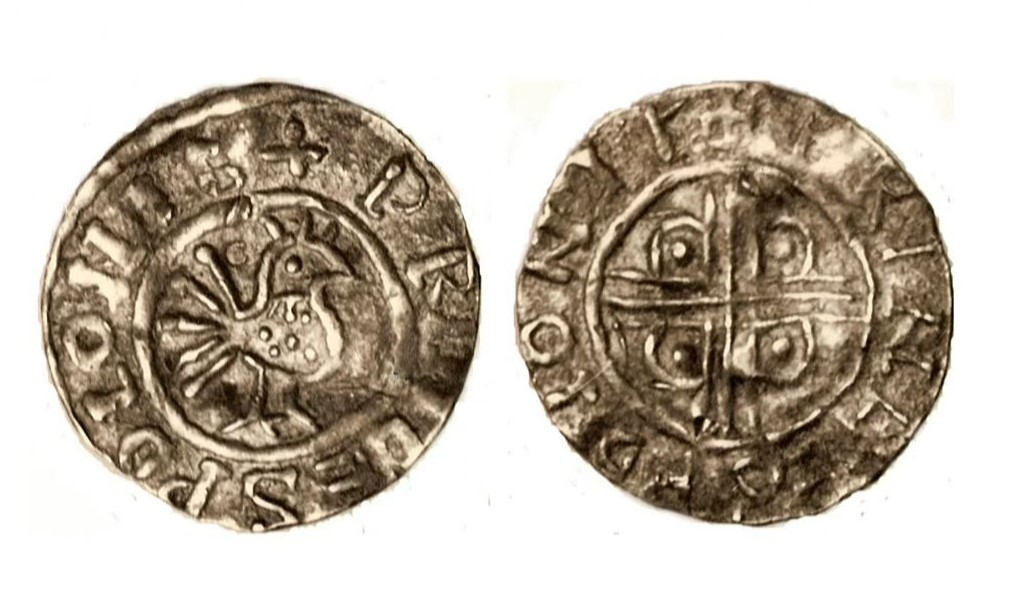
A denarius coin Princes Polonie, minted by Bolesław I the Brave in c. 1003–1005

Another source agreed to describe the pre-Christian Polan state of Mieszko I is the account of Ibrahim ibn Yaqub, a traveller, who was a contemporary of the Polan leader (having written of his travels from 962 to 964), and states that the country of "Mashaqqah" [Mieszko] is the "largest one among the countries of the Slavs [and] abounds in meat, honey, and agricultural produce [...] in the east the country of Mashaqqah borders with the Rus, and in the east, with the Burus [Prussians]". He also elaborates on the marriage customs, as well as warfare and government, of the Polans (see § Social structure and expansion).

Other sources referencing the Polans include a list of religious hymns from Reichenau Island, which, in 1001, mentions the nation of Poland in passing, in a hymn about Saint Adalbert: Polania ergo tanti sepeliens floret martyryii pignora, meaning "Polania has buried many, therefore flourishing with the pledges of martyrdom"; and the Princes Polonie denarius, dated to 1003–1005 and containing the text "PRINCE[P]S POLONIE" (duke of the Polans, duke of Poland). The Primary Chronicle, written in the Kievan Rus' in the late 12th century, also mentions the Polans as one of several Western Slavic tribes, and mentions another, separate tribe located by the Dniester, bearing an identical name; this, however, refers to a different tribal group.

== Historical narrative ==
The most common historical narrative of the Polans – known as the Polan hypothesis (Polish: hipoteza polańska) or conquest hypothesis (Polish: hipoteza podboju) – states that they were a powerful tribe originating in Greater Poland in the 8th century, led by a singular line of leaders from the House of Piast, and a rival of the Vistulans, who united Poland in a series of conquests in the 10th century under the leadership of Mieszko I, who undertook his baptism in 966 (traditionally perceived as the beginning of the unified Polish state). The historian Przemysław Urbańczyk states this narrative is derived from the Positivist worldview of its first promoters. He has also stated that the Polan tribe did not exist, but this claim has been widely rejected, although more moderate versions of his hypothesis are more widely accepted.

=== Provenance and settlements ===
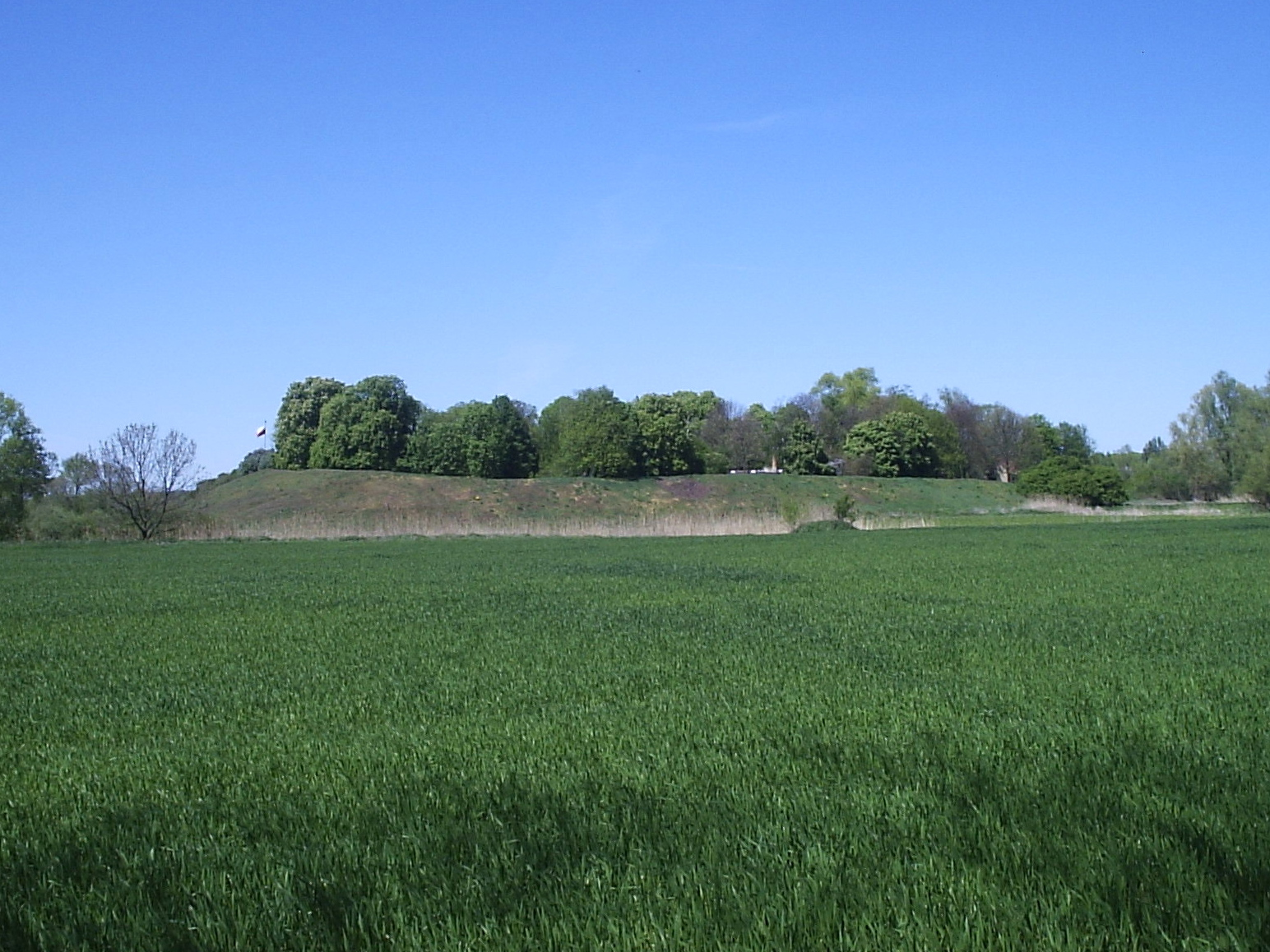
The medieval fortifications of Giecz

The Bavarian Geographer, writing in the mid-9th century, does not mention the Polans in his description of the West Slavic tribes; it has been hence speculated that the Polans were subjects of the then more powerful nearby Goplans, and that the name of the Polans derives from that of the latter tribe, and that, furthermore, the toppling of Goplan rule by the Polans was mythologized as the tale of Popiel II and Piast the Wheelwright; however, the etymological explanation has been largely rejected.

The foremost gords of the Polans were Gniezno, Grzybowo, Moraczewo, Giecz, Poznań, Bnin, and Ląd, most of which were founded in and around the Greater Polish Lakeland. A major debate surrounding the history of the Polans is in regard to the gords they originated from; a common hypothesis postulates that the original centre of Polan culture, economy, and political and military power was Giecz, the earliest Polan fortified settlement, which was an important economic and cultural centre alongside Poznań. However, different academics and their environments, foremost among them Andrzej Buko, promote the "Kalisz hypothesis", which states that the city of Kalisz was the earlier Polan point of origin, judging by the fact that older gords in the Kalisz area were less often destroyed and burnt, though this may be only evidence of a peaceful assimilation of the area.

The settlement of Gniezno, meanwhile, was a known pagan cult site of both the Goplans and Polans prior to its selection as the capital of the Piast state. Both it and Poznań were home to ducal forts, although Gniezno was home to frequent veche meetings and popular assemblies before the Piasts took power. Although initially believed to have been constructed by the Piasts, other settlements such as Ostrów Lednicki and Ląd were proven by archaeological excavations in the late 1990s and early 2000s to have existed prior to the period of Piast rule over the Polans.

=== Social structure and expansion ===
Generally, the culture and society of the Polans was similar to that of the entire rest of early medieval Poland; there were few cultural differences between the individual tribes. Ibrahim ibn Yaqub states this specifically about their marriage customs:

If a child is born to [a soldier], [Mieszko] orders the child to be paid a maintenance, regardless of the latter's sex. When the child grows, and he is a boy, he marries him and pays the dowry to the father of the bride. If the child is a girl, he marries her and pays the dowry to her father. The dowry of the Slavs is very big, and they pay it in the same way as the Berbers do. If a man, thus, has two or three daughters, he gets rich, but if he has two sons, he becomes poor.

As to their governance and warfare, Ibrahim states (likely referring to the druzhina):

The taxes [of Mieszko] are collected in market weights. Those are the salary of [Mieszko's] men in every month, and each of them has a certain amount of them to get. He has three thousand warriors wearing coats of mail; a hundred of them is worth a thousand of other warriors in the battle. He gives those men clothes, horses, arms, and everything they need.

The traditional narrative postulates that the Polans and other "Polish tribes" such as the Vistulans existed as a single, unified political entity, but the historian Przemysław Urbańczyk rejects this theory, and points towards early medieval Polan society having a generally "egalitarian" character, described by other historians as "democratic". The Piast seizure of power – which ultimately resulted in their selection of Gniezno as a ducal capital – also likely occurred relatively late (i.e. in the 940s, following an uprising of the Polabian Slavs in 936 that altered patterns of trade in Greater Poland), and was largely peaceful, despite earlier claims of a rapid and violent seizure of control. The Piast line of Chościsko, Piast, Siemowit, Lestek, and Siemomysł, who were the dukes of the Polans according to Gallus Anonymus, likely existed as ancestors or predecessors of Mieszko I, but their exact leadership roles are unclear.

Around the time of this speculated seizure of power, in the 930s and 940s, an explosion of construction activity occurred in Polania, with several Polan forts being enormously expanded or possibly constructed from the ground up. This, dubbed a "Polan Big Bang" by Andrzej Nowak, occurred in parallel with the Piast seizure of power in the region, and shortly before a series of Polan conquests across the Polish lands.

Following the taking of power by the Piasts, beginning in the 940s, various regions, including Kuyavia, Lesser Poland, and the Lublin Land, show signs of a violent conquest (according to recent archaeology), likely as a result of Piast expansion; by the end of his reign, at the beginning of the 990s, Mieszko controlled most of Greater Poland, as well as Pomerania, much of Silesia, and possibly Masovia and portions of northern Lesser Poland.

== See also ==
- Early Slavs
- Polish tribes
- West Slavs
- List of Medieval Slavic tribes
