= Przemysław Urbańczyk =

Polish archaeologist

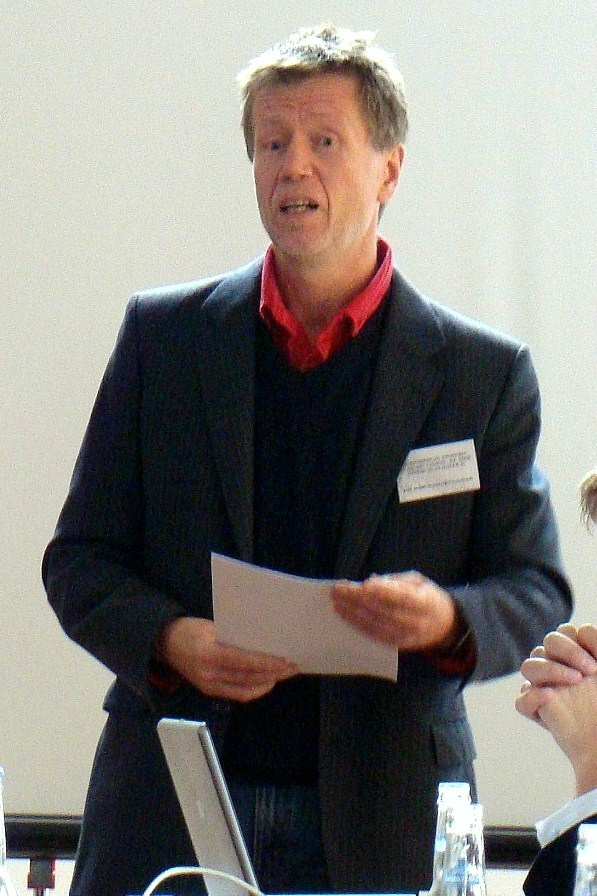
- Born: 21 October 1951 (age 75)

Academic work
- Discipline: Archaeology
- Institutions: Cardinal Stefan Wyszyński University in Warsaw

Przemysław Urbańczyk (born 21 October 1951) is a Polish medieval archaeologist, Full Professor at Cardinal Stefan Wyszyński University in Warsaw and the Institute of Archaeology and Ethnology of the Polish Academy of Sciences (PAS). From 2017 to 2023, he served as Director of the Polish Institute of Advanced Studies (PIASt) of the PAS.

Academic Career

He has been a member of the Committee on Pre- and Protohistorical Sciences of the Polish Academy of Sciences throughout its successive terms. He has represented Poland in the European Science Foundation (ESF), Europa Nostra, ALLEA, and the European Strategy Forum on Research Infrastructures (ESFRI). He has served on review panels on numerous occasions for the European Research Council (ERC), including panels SH5 and SH6 and Synergy Grants, the Irish Research Council for Humanities and Social Sciences, the European Union Prize for Cultural Heritage, the Boltzmann Gesellschaft, the Cyprus Research Foundation, as well as the National Science Centre (NCN), and the National Programme for the Development of the Humanities in Poland.

He was a member of the Expert Advisory Group for Societal Challenge 6 (SC6) under the European Union's Horizon 2020 programme. He also served on advisory and supervisory bodies for major interdisciplinary research programmes, including Transformation of the Roman World, EARTH, BOREAS, INSTAR, SAFE, SHAPE-ID, and STAR-LAB.

He has delivered papers at more than 70 international conferences and congresses held in 27 countries. He has also given 24 guest lectures at European universities in England, the Czech Republic, France, Ireland, Germany, Norway, Russia, Slovakia, Scotland, and Sweden, as well as at universities in the United States and Peru. He has led and continues to lead major research projects funded by the Foundation for Polish Science (FNP), the State Committee for Scientific Research (KBN), the Ministry of Science and Higher Education (MNiSW), the Ministry of Culture and National Heritage (MKiDN), and the National Science Centre (NCN). He has conducted fieldwork in Poland, England, Kuwait, Norway, Peru, Barbuda, and Iceland.

He has published more than 640 works on the history and archaeology of the early Middle Ages in Poland, Central and Eastern Europe, Scandinavia, and the islands of the North Atlantic, as well as articles on current affairs and public commentary.

He is a member of the editorial boards of Archaeologia Islandica, Journal of the North Atlantic, Medieval Worlds, and Sprawozdania Archeologiczne.

He has supervised 13 doctoral candidates to completion.

His honours and decorations include the Medal of the Commission of National Education (1991), the Gold Cross of Merit (1993), the Knight's Cross (2015) and the Commander's Cross (2022) of the Order of Polonia Restituta, and the Cross of Freedom and Solidarity (2025).

His awards and distinctions include: the PolCul Foundation Award (1987), the Princess Aleksandra Ogińska Medal (2008), the Medal of the Biskupin Archaeological Society (2017), the Lednica Piast Eagle Award (2021), the Józef Kostrzewski Award (2024), and the Polish Prime Minister's Award for Lifetime Achievement in Scientific Research (2025).

== Selected works ==
- The Soloey farm mound, 1985
- Medieval arctic Norway, 1992
- Władza i polityka we wczesnym średniowieczu, 2000
- Rok 1000. Milenijna podróż transkontynentalna, 2001
- Zdobywcy Północnego Atlantyku, 2004
- Herrschaft und Politik im Frühen Mittelalter, 2007
- Trudne początki Polski, 2008
- Mieszko Pierwszy Tajemniczy, 2012
- Myśli o średniowieczu, 2013
- Central Europe in the High Middle Ages, 2013
- Bliskie spotkania wikingów, 2014
- Zanim Polska została Polską, 2015
- Co się stało w 966 roku?, 2016
- Bolesław Chrobry - lew ryczący, 2017
- Co się stało w 1018 roku?, Poznań, 2018
- Trudna historia zwłok, vol. 1, Toruń 2020
- Niezwykli goście Bolesława Chrobrego, vol. 1 "Św. Wojciech i jego bracia", Toruń 2021;
- Niezwykli goście Bolesława Chrobrego, vol. 2 "Otto III - król i cesarz", Toruń 2022;
- Niezwykli goście Bolesława Chrobrego, vol. 3 "Św. Bruno i jego 'bracia'", Toruń 2023
- Korzenie Polski, vol. 1, Warszawa 2024
- Co się stało w 1025 roku?, Poznań 2025
- Korzenie Polski, vol. 2, Warszawa 2026
- Trudna historia zwłok, vol. 2, Toruń 2026
