= Dadosesani =

Slavic tribe that inhabited the area surrounding the central Bóbr River

The localization of the Silesian tribes between 9th and 10th centuries.

Dadosesani (Note: Polish: Dziadoszanie, Dziadoszyce, Dziadosicze; Latin: Dadosesani, Diedesisi, Diedesi, Diedesa, Dedosize, Dedosese) was a Slavic tribe that inhabited the area near the central Bóbr river, between the modern location of the towns of Szprotawa and Głogów, in the area of modern southwestern Poland.

== The location ==
The exact area that was inhabited by the tribe remains unknown. It was set in the area of the central Bóbr river, in the northern part of Lower Silesia, near the modern town of Głogów. The archeological studies had established, that in the area inhabited by the tribe functioned 31 smaller territories, 17 of which included gords. According to some sources, they bordered the Zara tribe to the west, via Bóbr river.

== History ==
The Bavarian Geographer had mentioned the tribe in his Descriptio civitatum et regionum ad septentrionalem plagam Danubii, published in the IX century. In said document, they were referred to as Dadosezani and Dadosesani, and according to it, they had 20 gords, and possibly visualized the Bobrans tribe.
