= Golensizi =

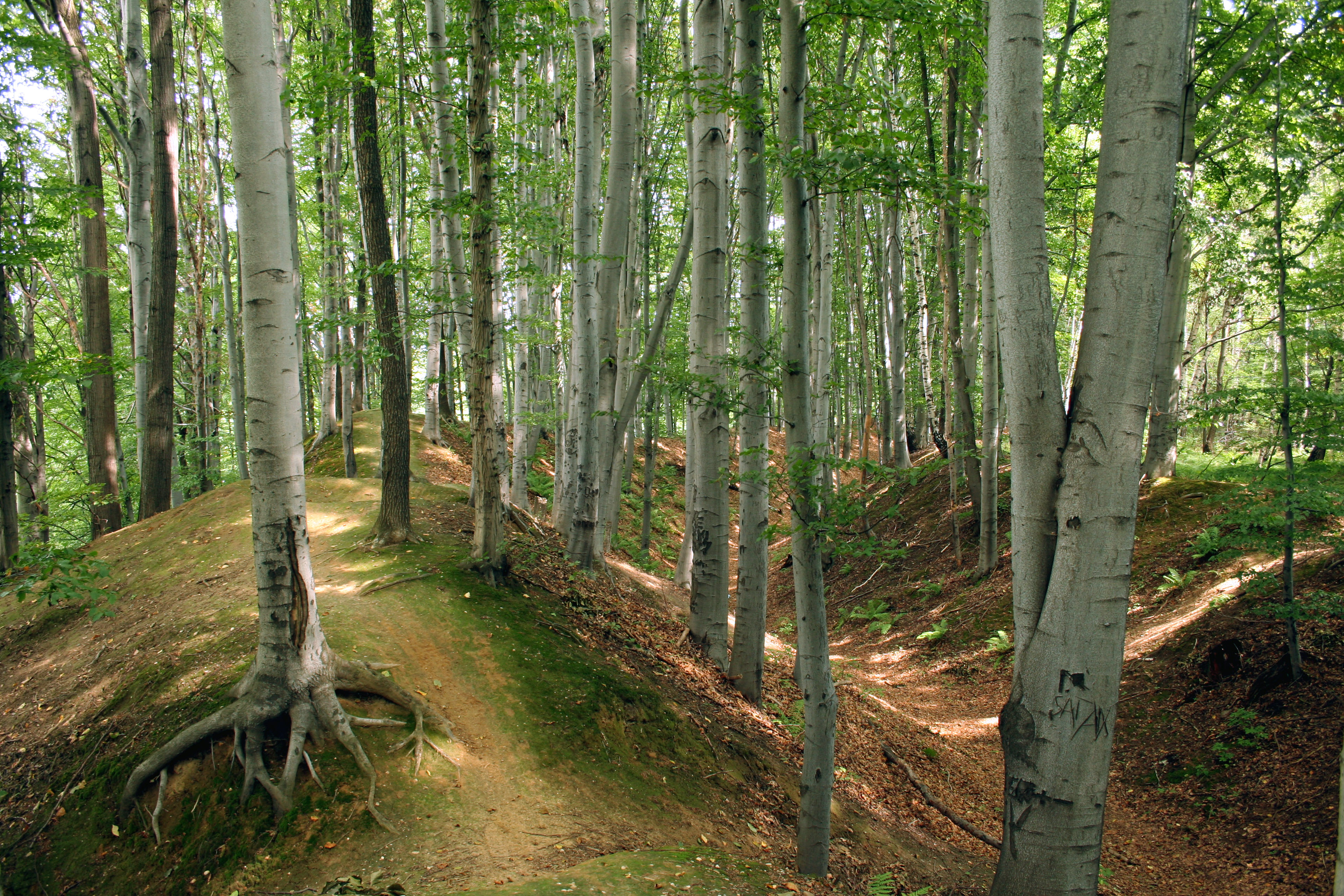
Golensizi gord in Lubomia (Poland)

The Golensizi (Polish: Golęszycy, Gołęszycy, Golęszyce, Gołęszyce, Gołężyce, Czech: Holasici, German: Golensizen) were a tribe of West Slavs, specifically of the Lechitic tribes (one of the Silesian tribes), living in the Early Middle Ages and inhabiting southern territories of what was later known as Upper Silesia, on the upper Oder River.

The area was settled by Slavs after it was abandoned by the Germanic tribes between the 5th and 6th centuries. Later, the organised tribe of Golensizi, according to Bavarian Geographer, had 5 civitates (strongholds). Among them, the most notable were located in Lubomia (the biggest), Chotěbuz and Hradec nad Moravicí, which was in 1155 mentioned as Gradice Golenzicezke. Some of them were most probably destroyed at the end of the 9th century by Svatopluk I, the king of Great Moravia. The settlement from the destroyed Chotěbuz moved to Castle Hill (Góra Zamkowa) in what is today the city of Cieszyn. Some historians claim that the area was then ruled by Great Moravia; however, that is now disputed. In 990 the area was adjoined by Mieszko I of Poland to his state. The conflict between Polish and Czech states over the land was resolved in a Treaty of Kłodzko in 1137. The smaller part of the area around Opava found itself within Czech state, whereas the rest in Polish where it was subdivided into two castellany of Cieszyn and Racibórz.

== See also ==
- List of Medieval Slavic tribes
