= Bobrans =

Silesian tribe

The Bobrzanie are one of the Silesian tribes mentioned in the Prague document from the 11th century CE. The area they inhabited was located on the Bóbr river, from which they took their name.
