= Polish people =

West Slavic ethnic group

Poles
Polacy (Polish)
- The flag of Poland, one of the symbols of Polish people

Total population
- c. 60 million

Regions with significant populations
- Poland, in black. 37,595,069 (2021)
- United States: 10,600,000 (2015)
- Germany: 2,253,000 (2018)
- Brazil: 1,800,000 (2007)
- Canada: 1,010,705 (2013)
- France: 1,000,000 (2022)
- United Kingdom: 682,000 (2021)
Other countries
Argentina	500,000 (2014)
Belarus	288,000 (2019)
Australia	216,056 (2006)
Israel	202,300 (2011) (Polish Jews, not ethnic Poles)
Lithuania	183,000 (2021)
Ukraine	144,130 (2001)
Sweden	118,060 (2025)
Ireland	112,500 (2018)
Norway	108,255 (2019)
Italy	97,000 (2016)
Austria	69,898 (2015)
Spain	63,000 (2019)
Netherlands	60,000 (2017)
Denmark	56,521 (2025)
Belgium	49,600 (2019)
Latvia	44,783 (2011)
Kazakhstan	34,057 (2018)
South Africa	30,000 (2014)
Russia	22,024 (2021)
Iceland	20,927 (2022)
Czech Republic	20,305 (2017)
Hungary	20,000 (2018)
Switzerland	20,000 (2007)
Paraguay	16,748 (2012)
Greece	15,000 (2019)
United Arab Emirates	14,500 (2015)
Chile	10,000 (2007)
Mexico	10,000 (2007)
Moldova	10,000 (2007)
Uruguay	10,000 (2007)
Slovakia	5,282 (2021)
Portugal	4,326
Japan	1,762 (2023)
Turkey	1,402 (2024)

Languages
- Predominantly Polish

Religion
- Predominantly Roman Catholicism

Polish people, or Poles, (Note: Polish: Polacy, [pɔˈlat͡sɘ̟]; singular masculine: Polak, [pɔˈlak]; singular feminine: Polka [pɔˈlka]) are a West Slavic ethnic group indigenous to Poland in Central Europe, sharing a common history, culture, and the Polish language. The preamble to the Constitution of the Republic of Poland defines the Polish nation as comprising all the citizens of Poland, regardless of heritage or ethnicity. The majority of Poles adhere to Roman Catholicism.

The population of self-declared Poles in Poland is estimated at 37,394,000 out of an overall population of 38,512,000 (based on the 2011 census), of whom 36,522,000 declared Polish alone. A wide-ranging Polish diaspora (the Polonia) exists throughout Eurasia, the Americas, and Australasia. Today, the largest urban concentrations of Poles are within the Warsaw metropolitan area and the Katowice urban area.

Ethnic Poles are considered to be the descendants of the ancient West Slavic Lechites and other tribes that inhabited the Polish territories during the late antiquity period. Poland's recorded history dates back over a thousand years to c. 930–960 AD, when the Western Polans – an influential tribe in the Greater Poland region – united various Lechitic clans under what became the Piast dynasty, thus creating the first Polish state. The subsequent Christianization of Poland by the Catholic Church, in 966 CE, marked Poland's advent to the community of Western Christendom. However, numerous other ethnic and religious identities exist among the Poles, such as Polish Jews.

== Exonyms ==
The Polish endonym Polacy is derived from the Western Polans, a Lechitic tribe which inhabited lands around the River Warta in Greater Poland region from the mid-6th century onward. The tribe's name stems from the Proto-Indo European *pleh₂-, which means flat or flatland and corresponds to the topography of a region that the Western Polans initially settled. The prefix pol- is used in most world languages when referring to Poles (Spanish polaco, Italian polacche, French polonais, German Pole).

Among other foreign exonyms for the Polish people are Lithuanian Lenkai; Hungarian Lengyelek; Turkish Leh; Armenian: Լեհաստան Lehastan; and Persian: لهستان (Lahestān). These stem from Lechia, the ancient name for Poland, or from the tribal Lendians. Their names are equally derived from the Old Polish term lęda, meaning plain or field.

== Ethnogenesis ==
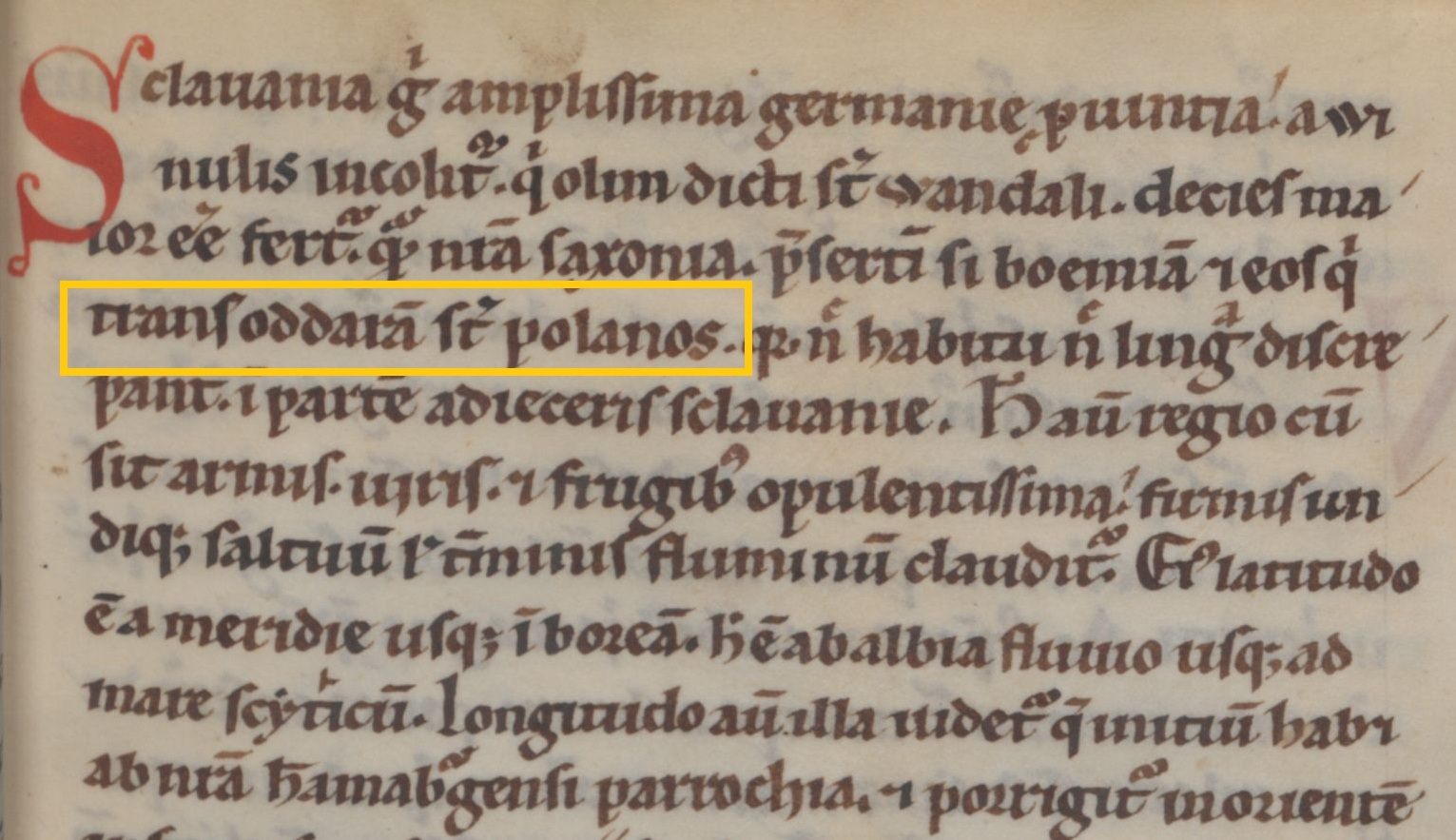
Fragment of Gesta Hammaburgensis ecclesiae pontificum (1073) by Adam of Bremen, containing the name "Polans": "trans Oddaram sunt Polanos"

The Polish people are descended from a blend of various ancient ethnic groups that inhabited the territory of modern-day Poland before and during late antiquity. The area was settled by numerous tribes and cultures, including Baltic, Celtic, Germanic, Slavic, Thracian, and possibly remnants of earlier Proto-Indo-Europeans and non-Indo-European peoples. Archaeological evidence from the Lusatian culture (c. 1300–500 BCE), as well as the successive Pomeranian, Przeworsk and Wielbark cultures, points to a diverse demographic landscape in prehistoric Poland. These cultures were associated with different ethnic groups, such as the Celts (notably in southern Poland), Germanic tribes like the Vandals and Goths, and the Balts in the northeast.

During the Migration Period, the region was becoming increasingly settled by the early Slavs (c. 500–700 AD). The Slavic settlers organised into tribal units and assimilated the remnants of earlier populations, thus contributing to the West Slavic ethnogenesis and identity of the numerous Polish tribes and Lechites. The names of many tribes are found on the list compiled by the anonymous Bavarian Geographer in the 9th century. In the 9th and 10th centuries the tribes gave rise to developed regions along the upper Vistula (the Vistulans), the Baltic Sea coast and in Greater Poland. The ultimate tribal undertaking (10th century) resulted in a lasting political structure and the creation of a Polish state.

== Language ==
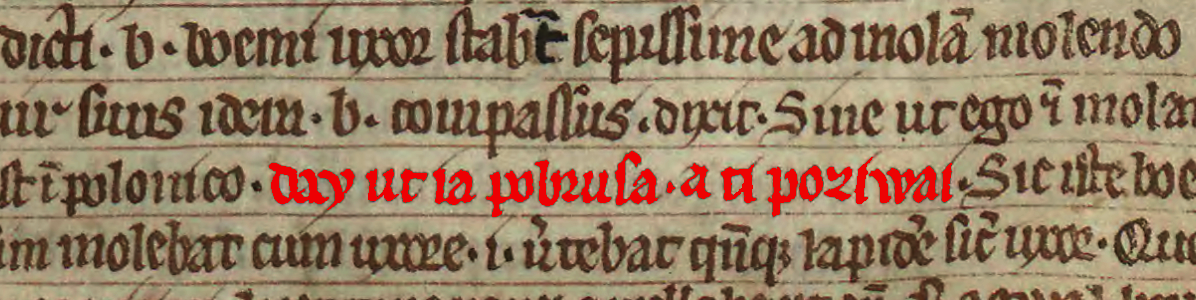
Book of Henryków. Highlighted in red is the earliest known sentence written in the Old Polish language

Polish is the native language of most Poles. It is a West Slavic language of the Lechitic group and the sole official language in the Republic of Poland. Its written form uses the Polish alphabet, which is the basic Latin alphabet with the addition of six diacritic marks, totalling 32 letters. Bearing relation to Czech and Slovak, it has been profoundly influenced by Latin, German and other languages over the course of history. Poland is linguistically homogeneous – nearly 97% of Poland's citizens declare Polish as their mother tongue.

Polish-speakers use the language in a uniform manner throughout most of Poland, though numerous dialects and a vernacular language in certain regions coexist alongside standard Polish. The most common lects in Poland are Silesian, spoken in Upper Silesia, and Kashubian, widely spoken in historic Eastern Pomerania (Pomerelia), today in the northwestern part of Poland. Kashubian possesses its own status as a separate language. The Goral people in the mountainous south use their own nonstandard dialect, accenting and different intonation.

The geographical distribution of the Polish language was greatly affected by the border changes and population transfers that followed the Second World War – forced expulsions and resettlement during that period contributed to the country's current linguistic homogeneity.

== History synopsis ==
=== Protohistoric ===
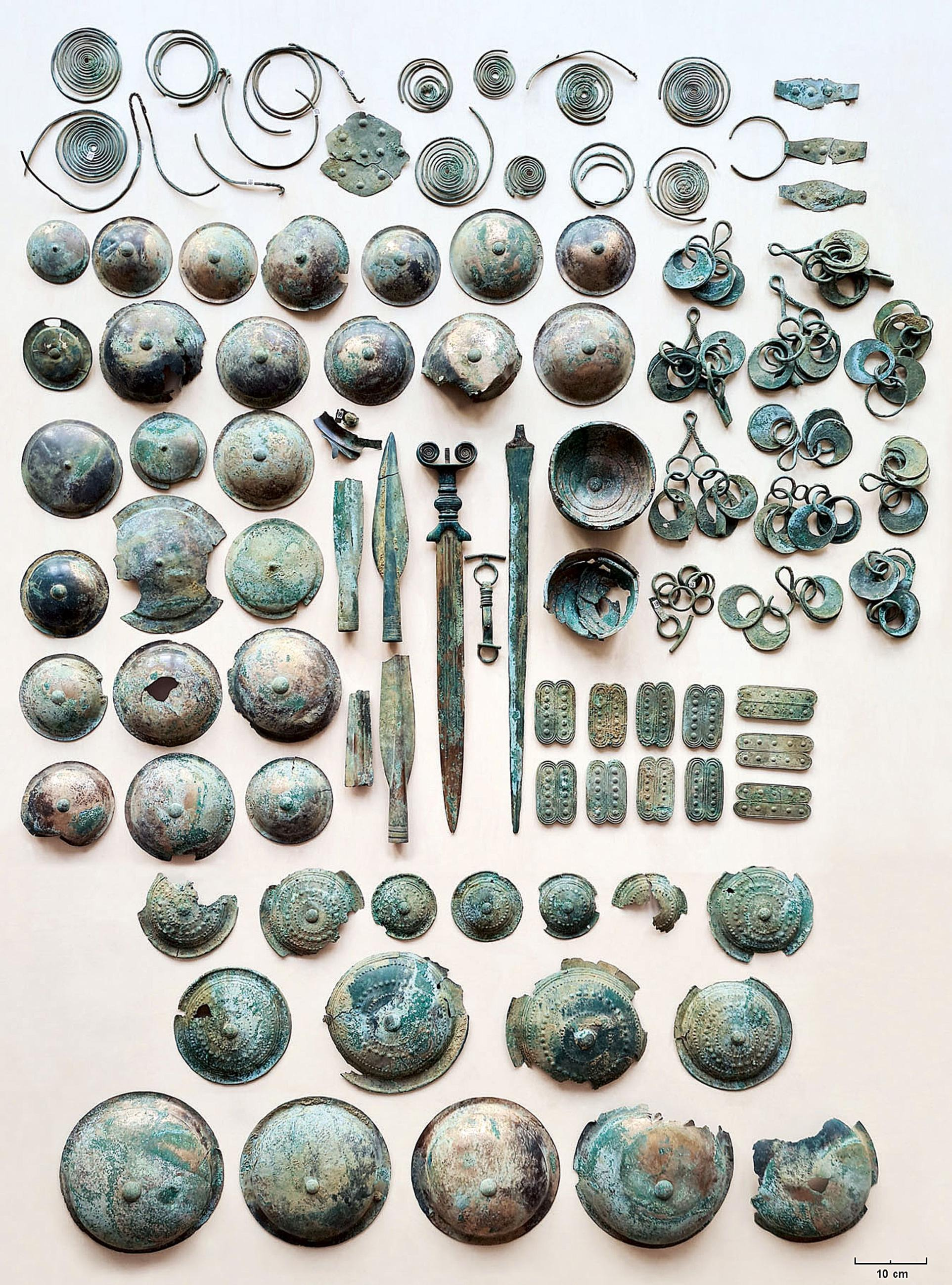
Artefacts showing the metallurgy and bronze making of the Lusatian culture, Pomerania, 8th century BCE

During the Neolithic period (c. 5500–2300 BCE), farming communities began to spread across the contemporary Polish lands, introducing agriculture, pottery, and domesticated animals. The Lengyel, Funnelbeaker, and Globular Amphora cultures were notable for their megalithic tombs, settlements, and ceramics. The Bronze Age (c. 2300–700 BCE) precipitated considerable advancements in craftsmanship with the emergence of the Unetice culture and later the Lusatian culture, the latter of which built the fortified settlement at Biskupin in the 8th century BCE. These communities engaged in bronze metallurgy, long-distance trade, and complex burial rites, including urnfield cremation cemeteries. Among some of the significant archaeological or megalithic sites in Poland are Bodzia (cemetery), Borkowo (cemetery), Nowa Cerekwia (excavations), Odry (stone circles), Węsiory (stone circles), Bronocice (worlds earliest known depictions of a wheeled vehicle) and Wietrzychowice (Kuyavian Pyramids mounds).

=== Classical ===
Poland's history during classical antiquity is primarily reconstructed through archaeological evidence, as the region lay outside the Roman Empire and produced few written records. In the 1st century BCE, the area was inhabited by Celtic tribes, notably the Boii, who established settlements in Lower Silesia. These groups were part of the La Tène culture, recognised for advanced metallurgy, intricate ornamentation, and distinctive burial customs. Evidence from sites along the Amber Road, a major trade route linking the Baltic Sea to the Mediterranean, indicates Poland's role as a corridor for goods like amber and ceramics during this period.

In the early centuries CE, the Przeworsk culture flourished in central and southern Poland, succeeding Celtic presence. The Przeworsk culture is notable for its cremation burials, iron weaponry, and Roman imports. Roman coins and military artifacts discovered in the Kuyavia region suggest contact between local populations and the Roman Empire, possibly through trade or mercenary service. By the 2nd century CE, the Wielbark culture, linked to Germanic peoples, began to dominate northern and central Poland and gradually replaced the earlier Oksywie culture. The Wielbark people did not bury weapons in graves, a practice distinct from their Przeworsk neighbours, but their cemeteries reveal long-distance contacts through Roman goods, including Roman glassware. The eventual decline of the Roman Empire in the 4th and 5th centuries coincided with the southward relocation of the Goths, leaving behind a cultural vacuum that was gradually filled by Slavic migration. The incoming tribes built defensive settlements called gords across much of Poland.

=== Medieval ===
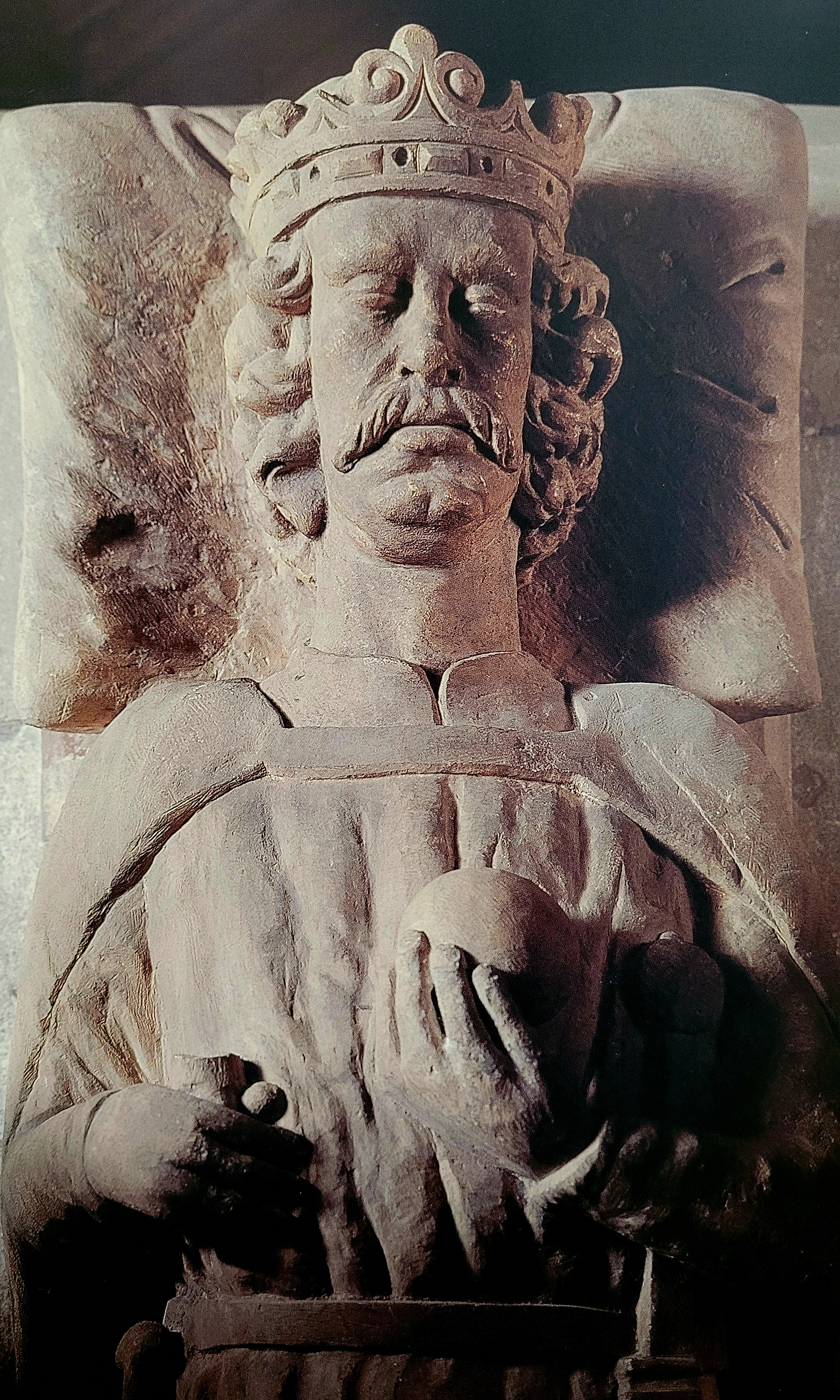
One of the earliest surviving tomb effigies of a Polish king – Władysław I the Elbow-high – at Wawel Cathedral in Kraków

The medieval history of Poland began in the 10th century with the rise of the Piast dynasty. Under Mieszko I, who accepted Christianity in 966 AD, Poland entered the sphere of Western Latin Christendom. This baptism marked the beginning of statehood and allowed the formation of diplomatic ties with the Holy Roman Empire and the Papacy. His son, Bolesław I the Brave, expanded the kingdom and was crowned the first King of Poland in 1025, establishing Poland as a regional power. However, his successors struggled to maintain control, and the country faced internal unrest, succession disputes, and pagan uprisings that weakened central authority.

In 1079, Bolesław II the Bold entered a conflict with the Catholic Church, culminating in the execution of Bishop Stanislaus, which led to his downfall and exile. After the death of Bolesław III Wrymouth in 1138, Poland entered a period of fragmentation, as the kingdom was divided among his sons into regional duchies. This weakened central authority and made the country vulnerable to external threats, including devastating Mongol invasions in the 13th century. However, the era also saw the growth of towns under Magdeburg Law, the settlement of foreign populations, and the founding of many institutions. The Teutonic Order, invited to confront pagan Old Prussians by Konrad I of Masovia, established its own state in the northeastern Baltic region, eventually becoming a hostile neighbour.

Poland’s reunification began under Władysław I the Elbow-high, who was crowned at Wawel Cathedral in 1320, and continued under his son, Casimir III the Great, who strengthened royal authority, modernised the legal system, and promoted education by founding the first Polish university in 1364. In 1385, the Union of Krewo united the Kingdom of Poland (Jadwiga) and the neighbouring Grand Duchy of Lithuania (Jogaila) under the Jagiellonian dynasty, forming a powerful Christian alliance in East-Central Europe. The Battle of Grunwald in 1410 marked a turning point in the struggle against the Teutonic State. By the late Middle Ages, Poland had emerged as a major European kingdom with growing political, cultural, and military influence.

=== Early modern ===
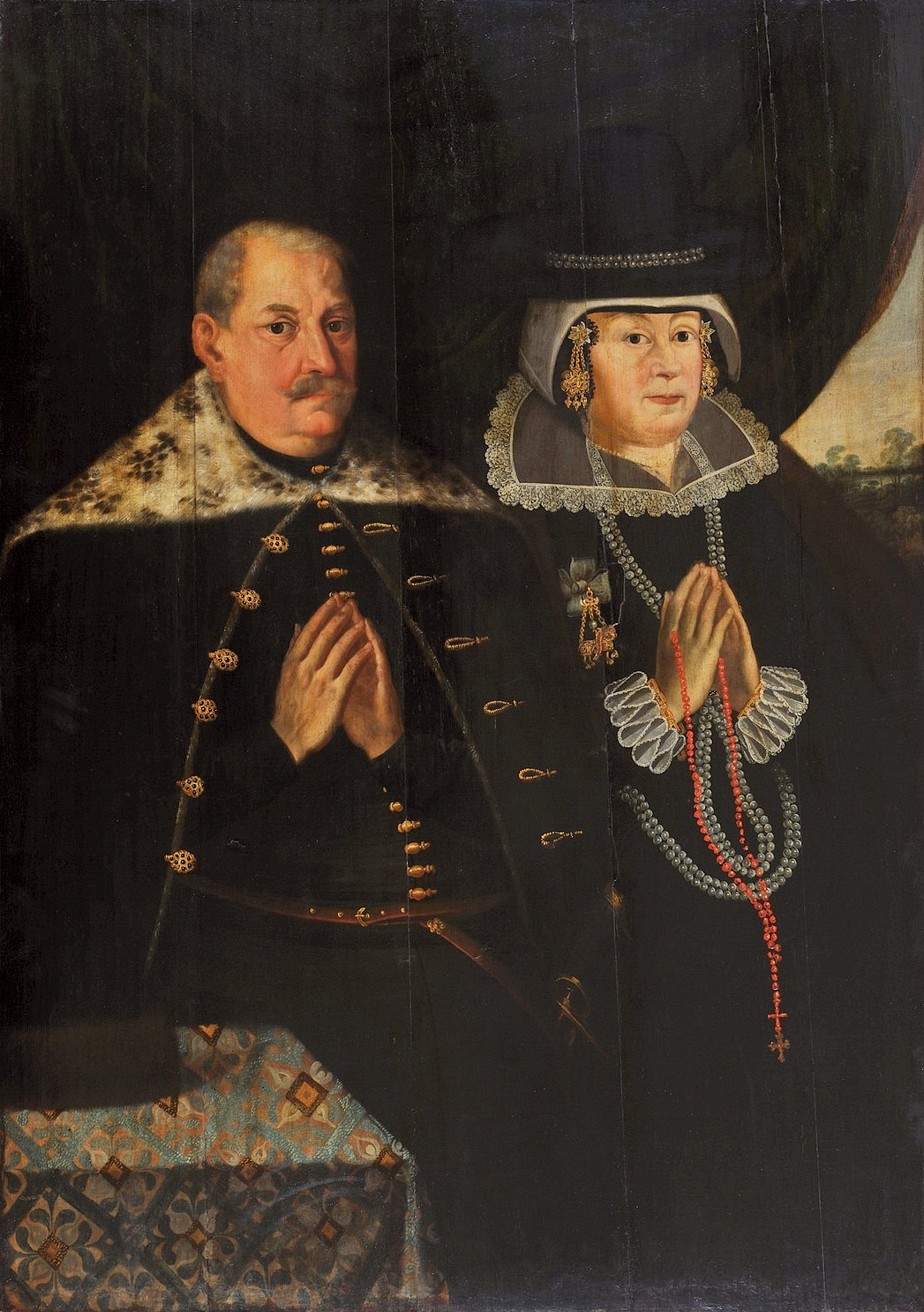
Portrait of a noble couple (szlachta) in prayer, Polish–Lithuanian Commonwealth, c. 1625

Between 1500 and the early 17th century, the Polish–Lithuanian Commonwealth emerged as one of the most powerful and expansive states in Europe. Established through the Union of Lublin in 1569, it united the Kingdom of Poland and the Grand Duchy of Lithuania under a single elected monarch and a shared parliament (Sejm). Governed by a unique system of noble democracy (Golden Liberty), the Commonwealth was characterised by a politically active nobility (szlachta) who wielded considerable political influence. This period is often regarded as Poland’s Golden Age, marked by territorial expansion and Polonisation, but also by religious tolerance enshrined in the Warsaw Confederation of 1573, and a flourishing of intellectual and cultural life. However, the death of Sigismund II Augustus in 1572 ushered in an era of instability driven by the weaknesses of an elective monarchy. The Vasa dynasty ruled from 1587 to 1668, beginning with Sigismund III, who also claimed the Swedish throne and moved Poland's capital from Kraków to Warsaw in 1596.

The mid-17th century marked the beginning of a prolonged period of decline for the Polish–Lithuanian Commonwealth. A series of destructive conflicts severely weakened the state and destabilised its frontiers, notably Ukraine's struggle for independence from Poland during the Khmelnytsky Uprising (1648) and the Swedish Deluge (1655–1660). Simultaneous wars with the Ottoman Empire and Russia further strained the Commonwealth’s resources and exposed its military and administrative vulnerabilities. Internally, governance was crippled by the liberum veto, a parliamentary mechanism that allowed any deputy to block legislation and dissolve the Sejm, rendering meaningful reform nearly impossible. Although symbolic military successes occurred, most notably John III Sobieski’s decisive role in the Battle of Vienna (1683), the victories could not compensate for the growing structural dysfunction.

In the 18th century, the situation deteriorated further. The Saxon kings from the House of Wettin, who ruled Poland in personal union, presided over a period of deepening political stagnation and increasing foreign interference. Despite reformist efforts by Stanislaus II Augustus, culminating in the progressive Constitution of May 3, 1791 aimed to strengthen central authority and modernise the state, these initiatives were met with hostility from neighbouring powers. In response, Russia, Prussia, and Austria orchestrated a series of territorial partitions in 1772, 1793, and 1795, thus erasing the Polish–Lithuanian Commonwealth from the map. By the close of the 18th century, Poland had ceased to exist as a sovereign state, initiating a long period of interchanging foreign rule that would last until the early 20th century.

=== Contemporary ===
Border changes of Poland after World War II resulted in the expulsion, movement and repatriation of millions of Polish citizens

After 123 years of partition, Poland regained independence in 1918 at the end of World War I, forming the Second Polish Republic under the leadership of Józef Piłsudski. The interwar period (1918–1939) was marked by efforts to consolidate borders, build a modern state, and manage deep political divisions. In 1939, Poland was invaded by Nazi Germany from the west and the Soviet Union from the east, triggering World War II. The country was occupied, but maintained its sovereignty through the establishment of the Polish Government-in-Exile, initially based in France and later in London. This government coordinated resistance efforts at home through the Home Army (Armia Krajowa), one of the largest underground movements in German-occupied Europe. Despite this, Poland suffered immense human and material losses, including the deaths of around six million Polish citizens, half of them Polish Jews who perished in various Nazi concentration and extermination camps during the Holocaust.

After the war, Poland fell within the Soviet sphere of political influence and became a communist country, the Polish People's Republic, under a one-party regime headed by the Polish United Workers' Party. The postwar period was marked by centralised planning, nationalisation of industry, and political repression, including censorship and the suppression of dissents. Despite periods of relative stability, widespread dissatisfaction with economic hardship and lack of political freedom persisted. This discontent culminated in the emergence of the Solidarity (Solidarność) movement in the early 1980s, led by Lech Wałęsa, which began as an independent trade union and evolved into a broader social and political force. Following the end of martial law (1981–1983), facing economic crisis and mounting internal pressure, the communist government entered negotiations with opposition leaders, leading to the Round Table Talks and the 1989 Polish parliamentary election. These events marked the beginning of a peaceful transition to democracy and to the establishment of the contemporary Third Polish Republic.

Since 1989, Poland has undergone significant political, economic, and social transformation. The country transitioned from a centrally planned economy to a market-based system and joined NATO in 1999 and the European Union in 2004. Poland remains a key player in Central Europe, with a growing economy, strong civil society, and a significant role in supporting regional security.

== Culture ==
The culture of Poland is closely connected with its intricate 1,000-year history, and forms an important constituent in the Western civilisation. Strong ties with the Latinate world and the Roman Catholic faith also shaped Poland's cultural identity. Various regions in Poland such as Greater Poland, Lesser Poland, Kuyavia, Masovia, Silesia, and Pomerania developed their own distinct cultures, cuisines, folklore and dialects. Also, Poland for centuries was a refuge to countless ethnic and religious minorities, who became an important part of Polish society and similarly developed their own unique customs.

=== Symbols ===
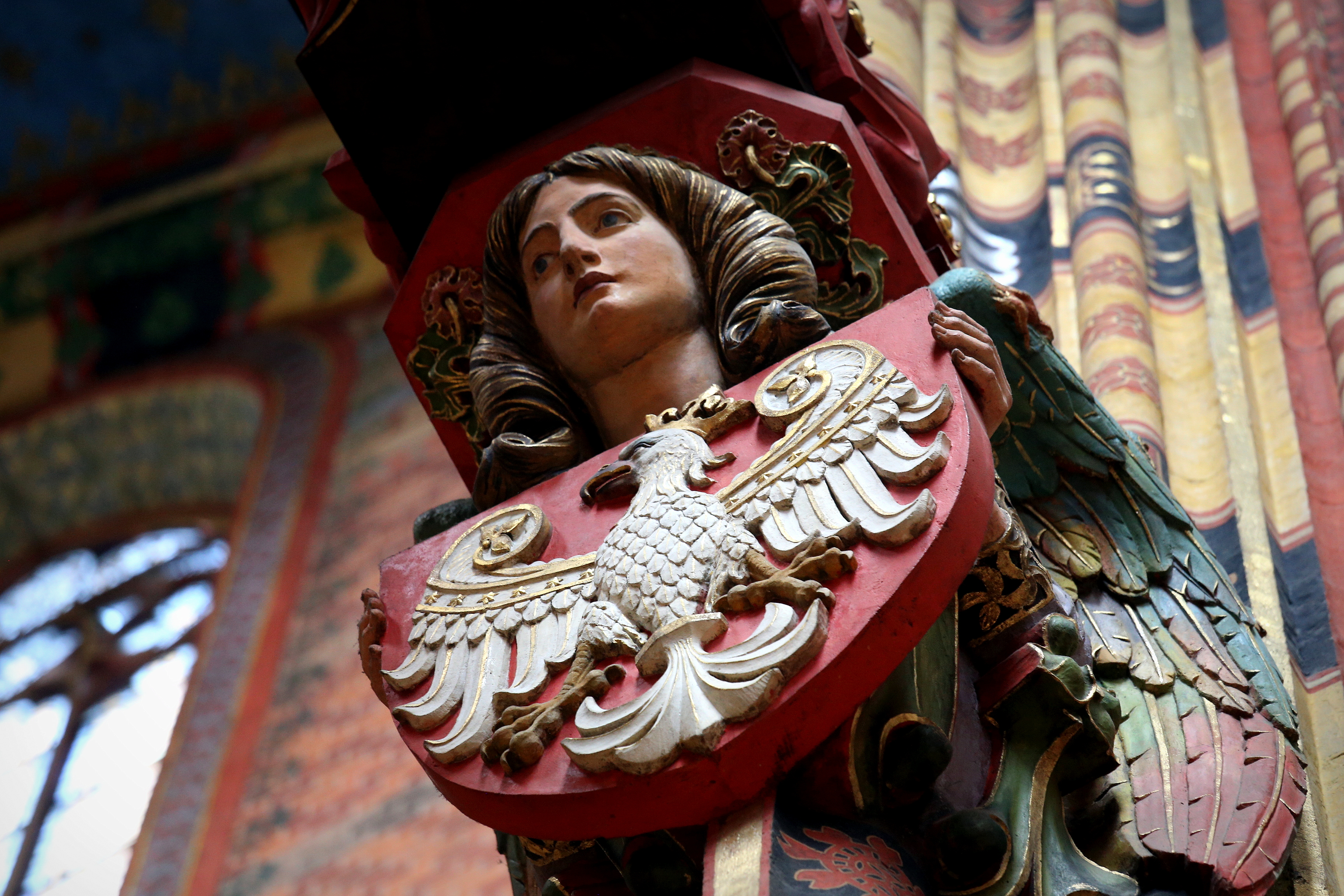
The Polish White Eagle is Poland's enduring national and cultural symbol

The Constitution of Poland from 1997 defines official state symbols of the Third Polish Republic as: the crowned white-tailed eagle (bielik, orzeł biały) embedded on the coat of arms of Poland (godło), the white and red flag of Poland (flaga), and the national anthem. The national colours along with variants of the white eagle often feature on banners, cockades, pins, and memorabilia. Among other unofficial and more nature-based symbols is the white stork (bocian), the European bison (żubr), the red poppy flower (mak), the oak tree (dąb), and the apple (jabłko) as the country's national fruit. Polonia has been the national personification and embodiment of Poland; it represents an allegorical female figure that personifies the Polish nation, much like Britannia for Great Britain or Marianne for France.

=== Names and speech etiquette ===
In Poland, naming conventions are governed by well-defined linguistic and cultural norms. Polish naming laws set by the Polish Language Council strictly ensure consistency with linguistic rules. A full name typically comprises one or two given names followed by a surname. Given names, of various linguistic origins, are often associated with name days (imieniny) that were once widely celebrated. Surnames are generally inherited and reflect grammatical gender; for instance, the masculine form Kowalski corresponds to the feminine Kowalska. Some surnames, such as Nowak, remain unchanged regardless of gender. Plural forms are also used when referring to families, such as Kowalscy.

Many surnames derive from occupational titles, geographic locations, or descriptive traits. Since the High Middle Ages, Polish-sounding surnames ending with the masculine -ski suffix and the corresponding feminine suffix -ska were associated with the nobility. Nobles also utilised Roman naming conventions, including agnomens. In speech etiquette, the Polish language maintains strict T–V distinction pronouns, honorifics and formalities when addressing individuals in vocative case (Pan for an adult man, Pani for an adult woman, Panna for a young unmarried woman); the extent to which affectionate forms or name diminutives are used can vary.

=== Literature ===
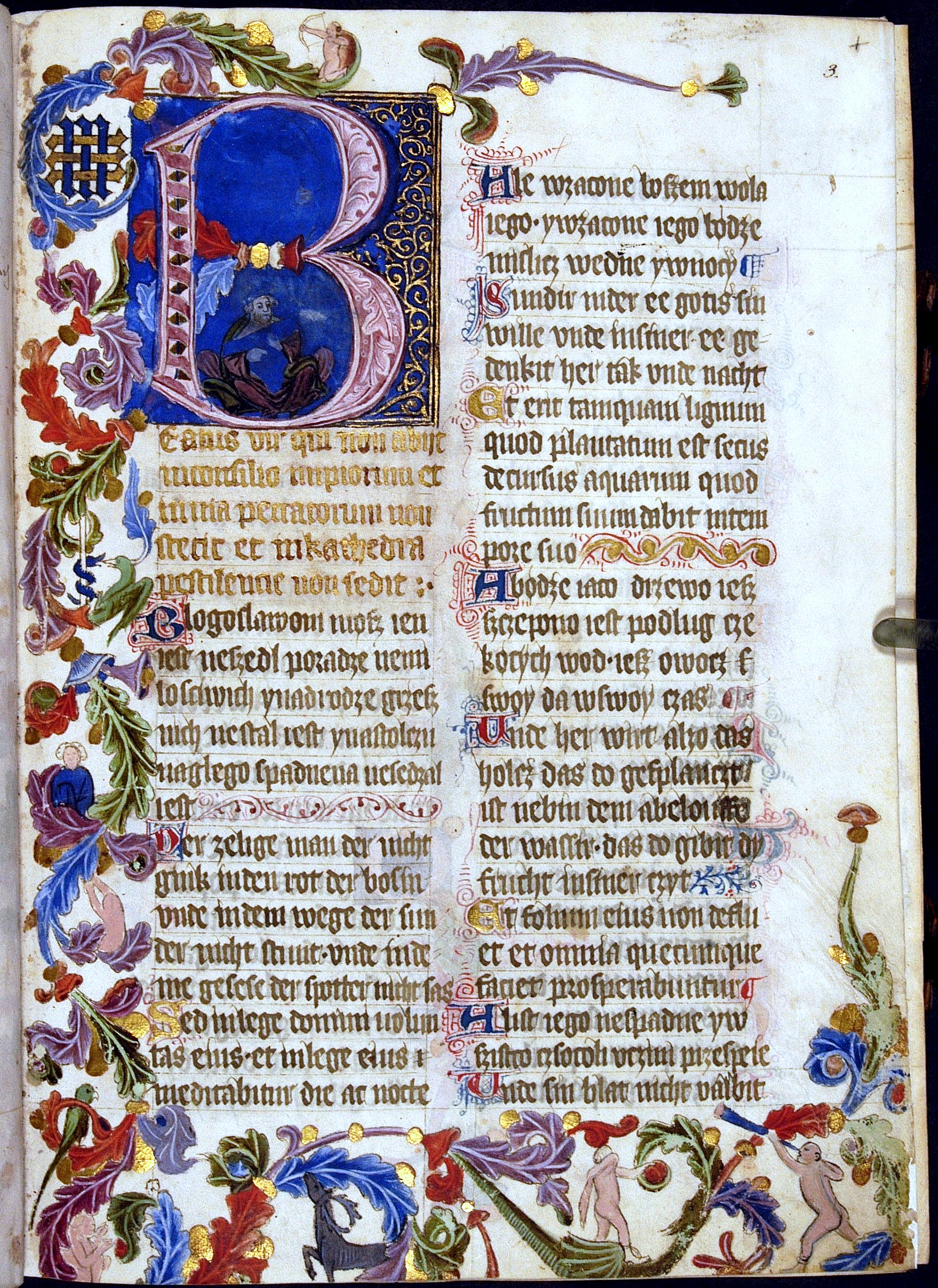
Saint Florian's Psalter one of the earliest surviving works in the Polish language, held at the National Library of Poland

According to a 2020 study, Poland ranks 12th globally on a list of countries which read the most, and approximately 79% of Poles read the news more than once a day, placing it second behind Sweden. As of 2021, six Poles received the Nobel Prize in Literature. (Note: In some instances only five laureates are acknowledged as Isaac Bashevis Singer resided in the United States and primarily wrote in Yiddish.) The national epic is Pan Tadeusz (English: Master Thaddeus), written by Adam Mickiewicz. Renowned novelists who gained much recognition abroad include Joseph Conrad (wrote in English; Heart of Darkness, Lord Jim), Stanisław Lem (science-fiction; Solaris) and Andrzej Sapkowski (fantasy; The Witcher).

Earliest examples of Polish literature date back to the 10th and 11th centuries, when they were primarily written in Latin, with religious texts and chronicles like Gesta principum Polonorum by Gallus Anonymus (early 12th century) providing a foundational account of Poland's early rulers. The Holy Cross Sermons are the oldest extant prose texts in Polish, dating from the 14th century and preserved only in fragments. Saint Florian's Psalter, a trilingual manuscript in Latin, Polish, and German, is one of the earliest complete translations of the Psalms, and the Bible of Queen Sophia is the first complete translation of the Bible into Polish. This period of Latin-dominated writing gradually gave way to the use of the Polish language in literature during the Renaissance (Mikołaj Rey and Jan Kochanowski) in the 16th century.

=== Education and sciences ===
Personal achievement and education plays an important role in Polish society today. In 2018, the Programme for International Student Assessment ranked Poland 11th in the world for mathematics, science and reading. Education has been of prime interest to Poland since the early 12th century, particularly for its noble classes. In 1364, King Casimir the Great founded the Kraków Academy, which would become Jagiellonian University, the second-oldest institution of higher learning in Central Europe.

Poland made important contributions to science, particularly during the Renaissance and Enlightenment; among the chief figures was Nicolaus Copernicus, who revolutionised astronomy with his heliocentric theory. During the partitions in the 18th and 19th centuries, scientific societies and educational efforts kept knowledge alive. The Warsaw Society of Friends of Learning, Kraków's Polish Academy of Arts and Sciences and secret teaching networks (Flying University) played crucial roles in preserving intellectual life. In the 20th century, Poland produced several Nobel Prize winners in science, including Marie Skłodowska–Curie, a pioneer in radioactivity. People of Polish birth or citizenship have also made considerable contributions in the fields of philosophy, psychology, technology and mathematics both in Poland and abroad, among them Alfred Tarski, Benoit Mandelbrot, Bronisław Malinowski, Leonid Hurwicz, Leszek Kołakowski, Ralph Modjeski, Rudolf Weigl, Solomon Asch, Stefan Banach, and Stanisław Ulam.

=== Music and dance ===
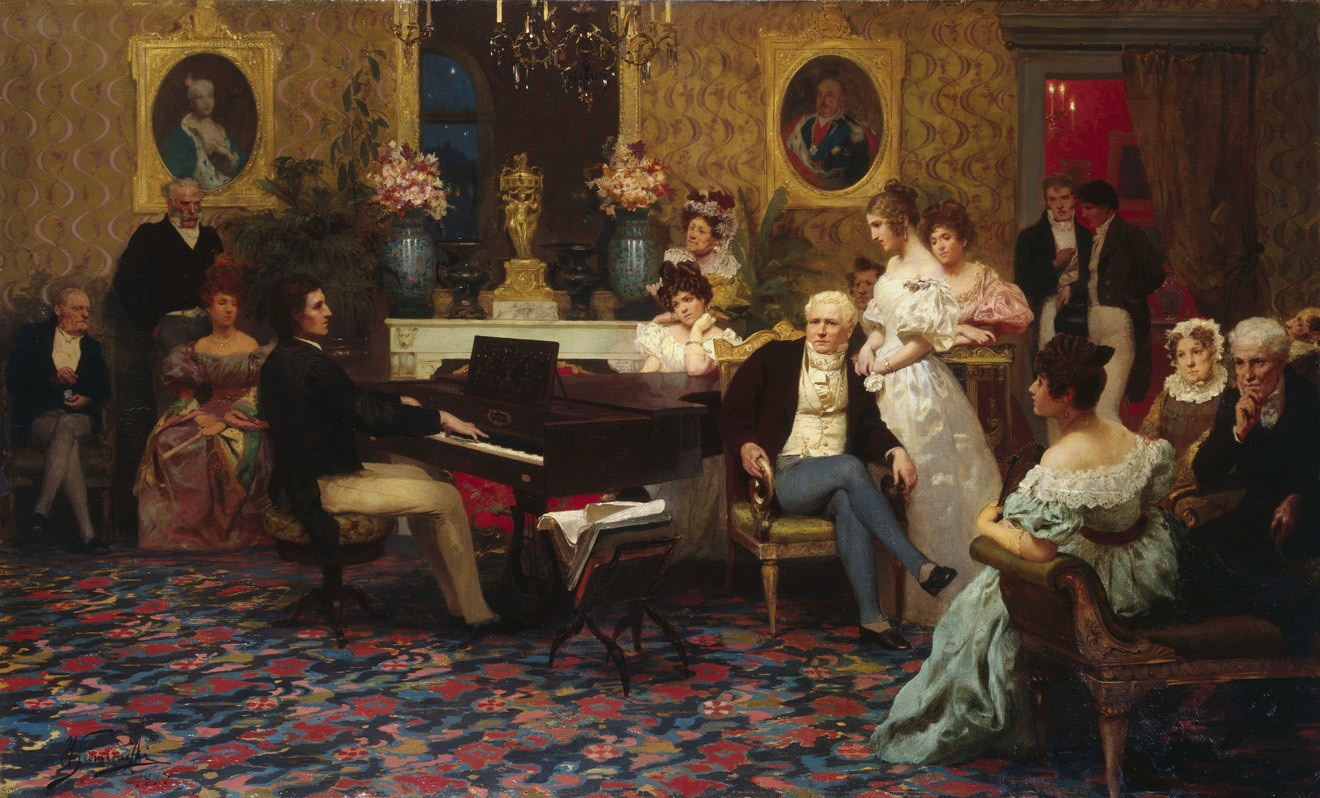
Frédéric Chopin plays in the salon for the Radziwiłł family, 1829. Painting by Henryk Siemiradzki from 1887

Traditional Polish music is characterised by distinctive regional styles and features folk instruments such as the fiddle, accordion, and clarinet. Particularly notable is the highland bagpipe and fiddle music from the Tatra Mountains, recognised for its dynamic rhythms and expressive melodies. Poland has also made significant contributions to the classical music canon, most prominently through the works of Polish pianist and composer Frédéric Chopin, whose compositions remain central to the Romantic repertoire.

The Polish folk dances, including the polonaise, mazurka, krakowiak (cracovienne), oberek, and kujawiak, feature diverse rhythmic structures, tempos and choreographic patterns. Moreover, the polka resonated with Polish dance traditions and was incorporated into local repertoires. The dance tunes were popularised by Chopin in Europe and by the Polish-American community in North America.

Latin songs and religious hymns such as Gaude Mater Polonia and Bogurodzica were once chanted in places of worship and during festivities, but the tradition has faded. Sung poetry, disco polo and jazz remain important in Poland’s musical identity, the latter supported by a strong tradition dating back to the mid-20th century. In modern times, hip-hop has emerged as one of the most influential genres among younger audiences, often characterised by its strong connection to urban culture.

=== Art ===
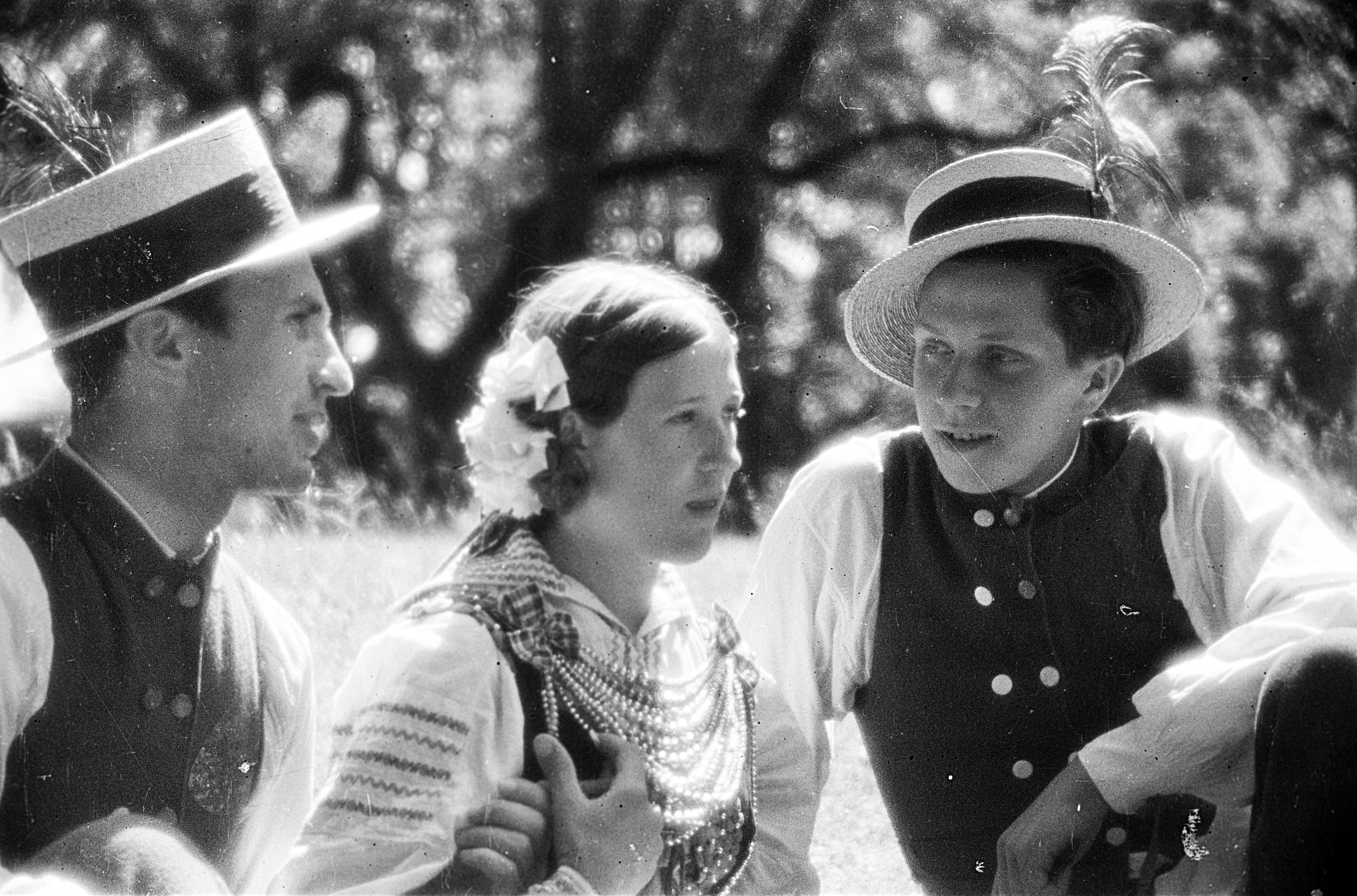
Two men and a woman in folk costumes from the Lublin region, 1938

During the Middle Ages and the Renaissance, Poland absorbed Western European artistic influences while developing its own unique expressions. Gothic architecture, in particular Brick Gothic, as well as religious iconography, and illuminated manuscripts flourished in the medieval period, followed by a Renaissance golden age in music and architecture influenced by Italy and the Netherlands. Artists like Jan Matejko in the 19th century brought national history to life with historical painting, which played a significant role in fostering Polish identity. In the 20th and 21st centuries, Polish art reflected the country’s shifting political and cultural landscape; the various styles comprised Modernism, Art Deco, Surrealism, Socialist Realism and Abstract art. In general, Polish art is deeply engaged with questions of history, identity, and resilience.

The use of colourful flower motifs, woodworking, papercutting, and needlework are important parts of Polish folk art. Traditional Polish folk costumes (stroje ludowe) often feature rich embroidery, vivid colours, and decorative elements such as beads, ribbons, and lace. Women’s attire typically includes long skirts, aprons, embroidered blouses, corsets or vests, and headscarves or wreaths, while men’s outfits often feature embroidered shirts, sashes, hats, and high boots. Some of the most well-known regional costumes include the Łowicz garb, the Goral (Highlander) clothing from the Tatra Mountains, and the Kraków costume, often considered Poland's national dress. Rogatywka, also known as a "konfederatka", is a type of hat which originated in Poland and is worn by the military.

=== Food culture ===
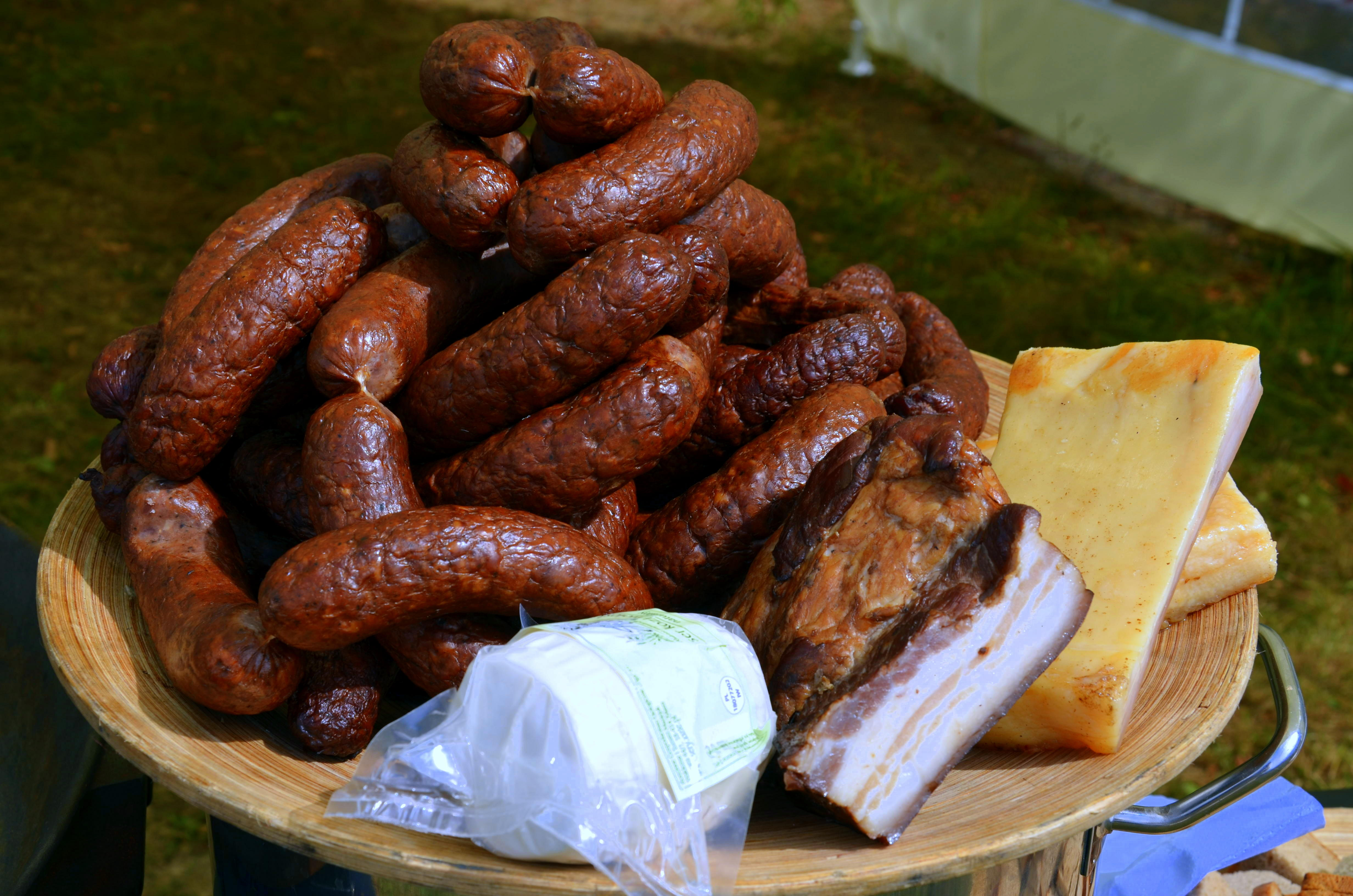
Kielbasa sausages; meat and pork consumption per capita in Poland is high

Meals are typically structured around three main parts: breakfast (śniadanie), dinner (obiad), the largest meal of the day, and supper (kolacja), though eating second breakfast (drugie śniadanie) or evening snacks is characteristic for Poland. Popular everyday foods include pork cutlets (kotlet schabowy), schnitzels, kielbasa sausage, potatoes, coleslaw and salads, soups (barszcz, tomato or meat broth), pierogi dumplings, and various types of bread (kaiser rolls, rye bread, bagels). Polish cuisine also reflects strong seasonal and religious influences; during Lent, traditional dishes become meatless, often featuring fish like herring or carp, while Christmas Eve (Wigilia) is celebrated with a twelve-dish vegetarian meal.

Traditional Polish cuisine is hearty and Poles are one of the more obese nations in Europe – approximately 58% of the adult population was overweight in 2019, above the EU average. According to data from 2017, meat consumption per capita in Poland was one of the highest in the world, with pork being the most in demand. Vegetarianism is on the rise, though this is not measured by the Statistical Office. Alcohol consumption is relatively moderate compared to other European states; popular alcoholic beverages include Polish-produced beer, vodka and ciders.

== Religion ==
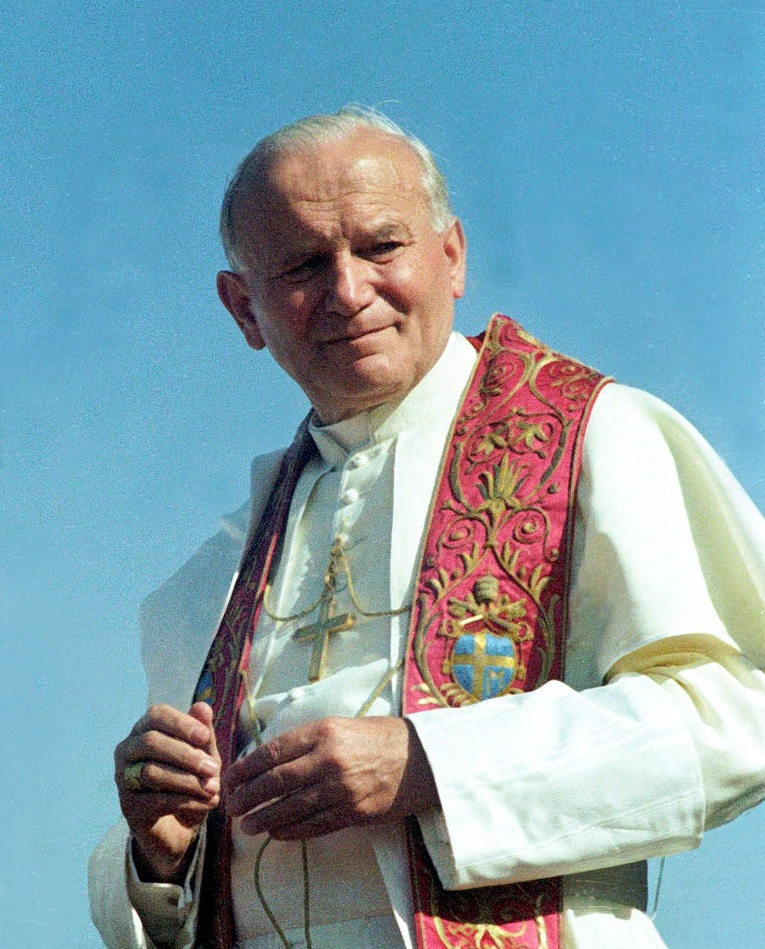
John Paul II was the first Pole to become a Roman Catholic Pope

Poles have traditionally adhered to the Christian faith; an overwhelming majority belongs to the Roman Catholic Church, with 87.5% of Poles in 2011 identifying as Roman Catholic. According to Poland's Constitution, freedom of religion is ensured to everyone. It also allows for national and ethnic minorities to have the right to establish educational and cultural institutions, institutions designed to protect religious identity, as well as to participate in the resolution of matters connected with their cultural identity.

There are smaller communities primarily comprising Protestants (especially Lutherans), Orthodox Christians (migrants), Jehovah's Witnesses, those irreligious, and Judaism (mostly from the Jewish populations in Poland who have lived in Poland prior to World War II) and Sunni Muslims (Polish Tatars). Roman Catholics live all over the country, while Orthodox Christians can be found mostly in the far north-eastern corner, in the area of Białystok, and Protestants in Cieszyn Silesia and Warmia-Masuria regions. A growing Jewish population exists in major cities, especially in Warsaw, Kraków and Wrocław. Over two million Jews of Polish origin reside in the United States, Brazil, and Israel.

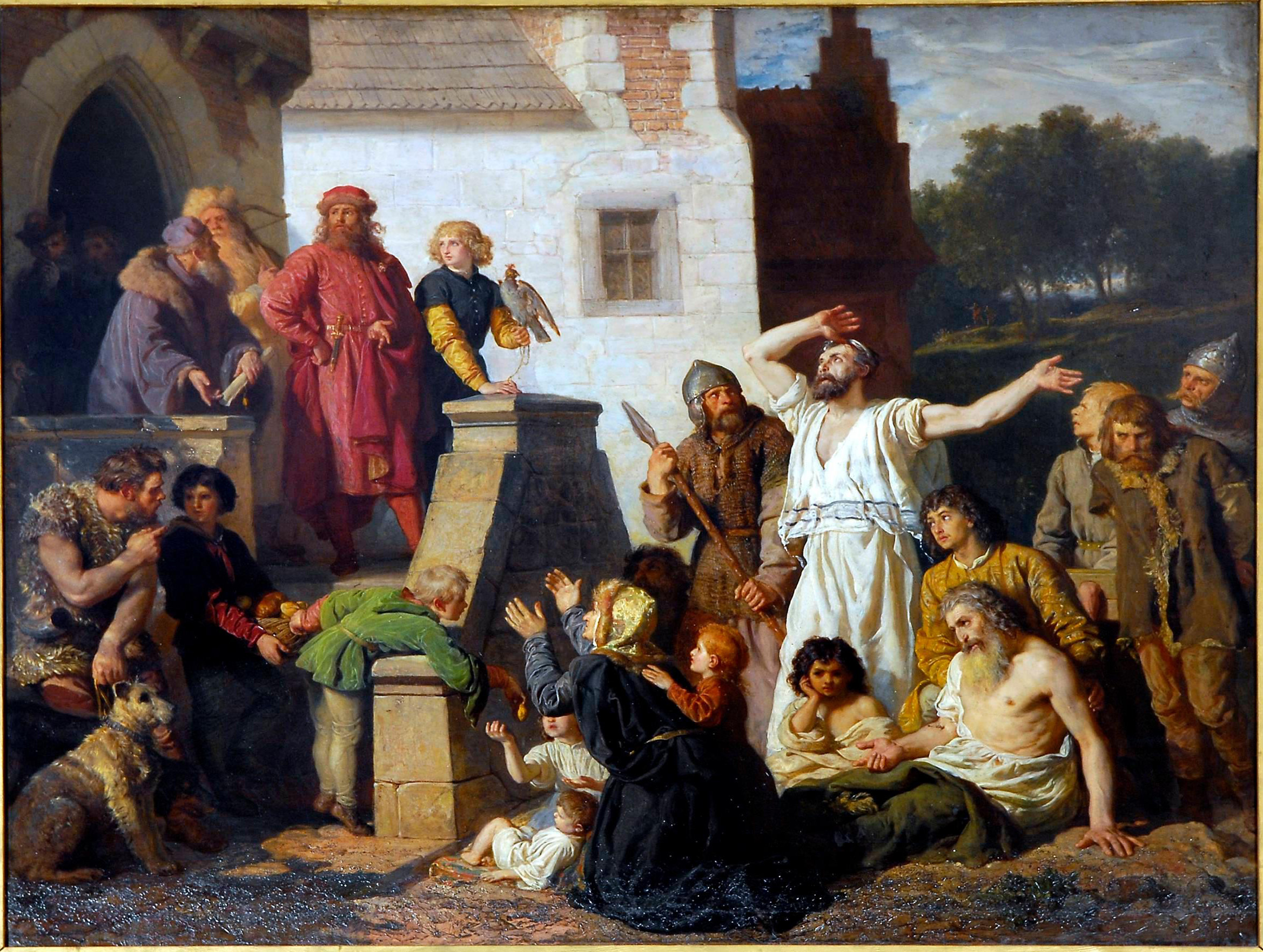
Casimir III the Great welcomes the Jews to Poland. Painting by Wojciech Gerson

Religious organisations in the Republic of Poland can register their institution with the Ministry of Interior and Administration creating a record of churches and other religious organisations who operate under separate Polish laws. This registration is not necessary; however, it is beneficial when it comes to serving the freedom of religious practice laws.

Slavic Native Faith (Rodzimowiercy) groups, registered with the Polish authorities in 1995, are the Native Polish Church (Rodzimy Kościół Polski), which represents a pagan tradition going back to Władysław Kołodziej's 1921 Holy Circle of Worshippers of Światowid (Święte Koło Czcicieli Światowida), and the Polish Slavic Church (Polski Kościół Słowiański). There is also the Native Faith Association (Zrzeszenie Rodzimej Wiary, ZRW), founded in 1996.

== Geographic distribution ==
The map depicts countries by number of citizens who reported Polish ancestry or citizenship (based on sources in this article) Poland + 10,000,000 + 1,000,000 + 100,000 + 10,000

Distribution of Poles in the 19th century over 50% Polish 30% – 50% Polish 20% – 30% Polish 10% – 20% Polish 5% – 10% Polish 3% – 5% Polish 1% – 3% Polish

Polish people are the fifth-largest national group in the European Union (EU) after Germans, French, Italians and Spaniards. Estimates vary depending on source, though available data suggest a total number of up to 60 million people worldwide (with up to 22 million living outside of Poland). There are almost 38 million Poles in Poland alone. There are also strong Polish communities in neighbouring countries, whose territories were once occupied or part of Poland – western Belarus, western Ukraine, Lithuania, Latvia and in the Cieszyn Silesia region of the Czech Republic.

The term "Polonia" is usually used in Poland to refer to people of Polish origin who live outside Polish borders. There is a notable Polish diaspora in the United States, Brazil, and Canada. France has a historic relationship with Poland and has a relatively large Polish-descendant population. Poles have lived in France since the 18th century. In the early 20th century, over a million Polish people settled in France, mostly during world wars, among them Polish émigrés fleeing either Nazi occupation (1939–1945) or Communism (1945/1947–1989). There is also a notable Polish diaspora in the United Kingdom and in Germany.

In the United States, a significant number of Polish immigrants settled in Chicago (billed as the world's most Polish city outside of Poland), Milwaukee, Ohio, Detroit, New Jersey, New York City, Orlando, Pittsburgh, Buffalo, and New England. The highest concentration of Polish Americans in a single New England municipality is in New Britain, Connecticut. In year 1900 the largest Catholic Polish communities in the United States were in Pennsylvania, New York State, Illinois, Wisconsin and Michigan. The majority of Polish Canadians have arrived in Canada since World War II. The number of Polish immigrants increased between 1945 and 1970, and again after the end of Communism in Poland in 1989. In Brazil, the majority of Polish immigrants settled in Paraná State. Smaller, but significant numbers settled in the states of Rio Grande do Sul, Espírito Santo and São Paulo (state). The city of Curitiba has the second largest Polish diaspora in the world (after Chicago) and Polish music, dishes and culture are quite common in the region.

A recent large migration of Poles took place following Poland's accession to the European Union in 2004 and with the opening of the EU's labor market; an approximate number of 2 million, primarily young, Poles taking up jobs abroad. It is estimated that over half a million Polish people went to work in the United Kingdom from Poland. Since 2011, Poles have been able to work freely throughout the EU where they have had full working rights since Poland's EU accession in 2004. The Polish community in Norway has increased substantially and has grown to a total number of 120,000, making Poles the largest immigrant group in Norway. Only in recent years has the population abroad decreased, specifically in the UK with 116.000 leaving the UK in 2018 alone. There is a large minority of Polish people in Ireland that makes up approximately 2.57% of the population.

== See also ==
- Demographics of Poland
- Karta Polaka
- Lechites
- List of Poles
- Names of Poland (etymology of the demonym)
- Pole and Hungarian brothers be
- Poles in France
- Poles in Germany
- Poles in Latvia
- Poles in Lithuania
- Poles in Norway
- Poles in Romania
- Poles in the Soviet Union
- Poles in Spain
- Poles in the United Kingdom
- Polish Americans
- Polish Argentines
- Polish Australians
- Polish Brazilians
- Polish Canadians
- Polish Chileans
- Polish Mexicans
- Polish minority in Ireland
- Polish Czechs
- Polish nationality law
- Polish New Zealanders
- Polish Uruguayans
- Polish Venezuelans
- Polonisation
- Sons of Poland
- West Slavs
