= Bible translations into Polish =

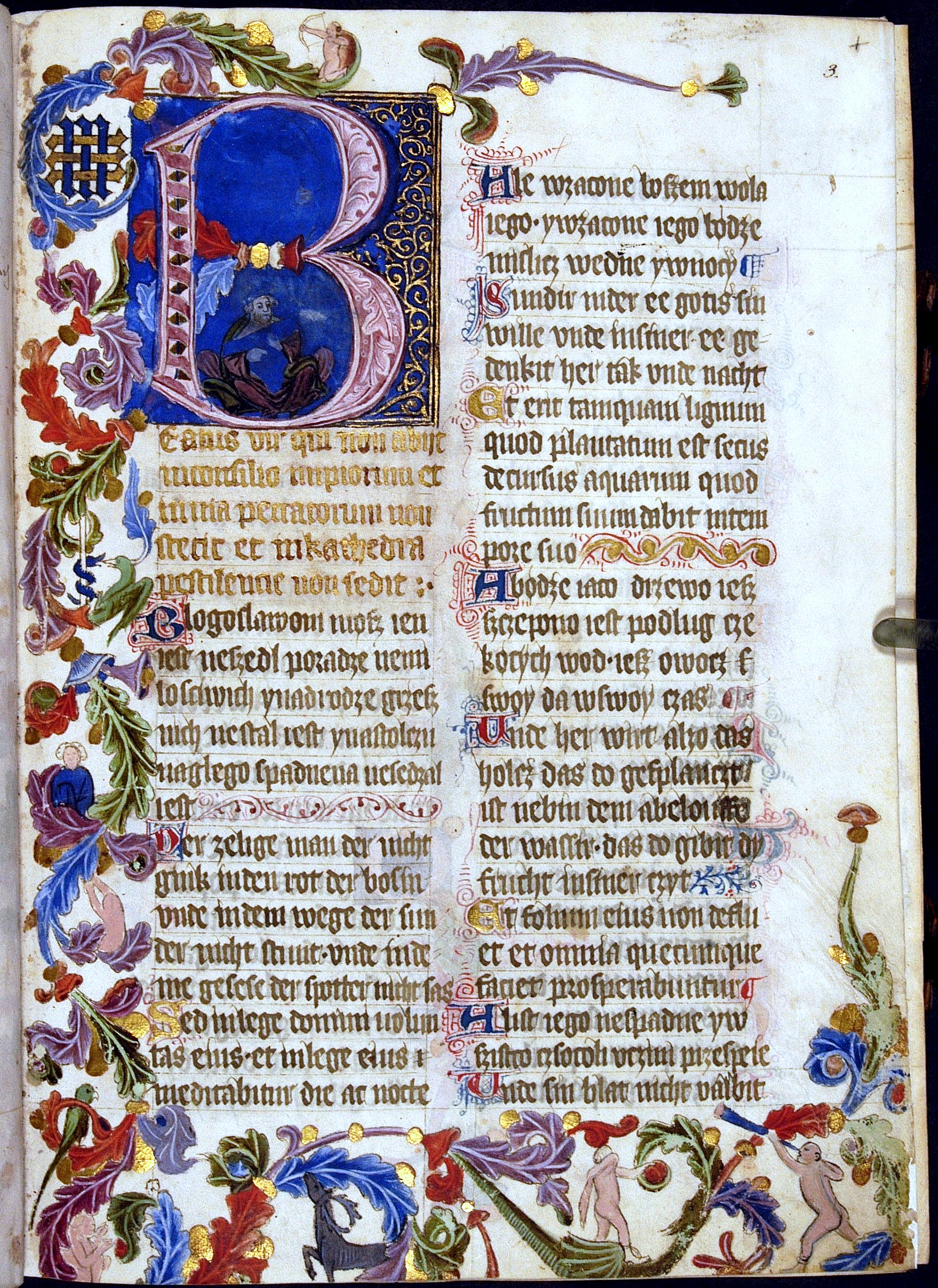
Saint Florian's Psalter, 14th century

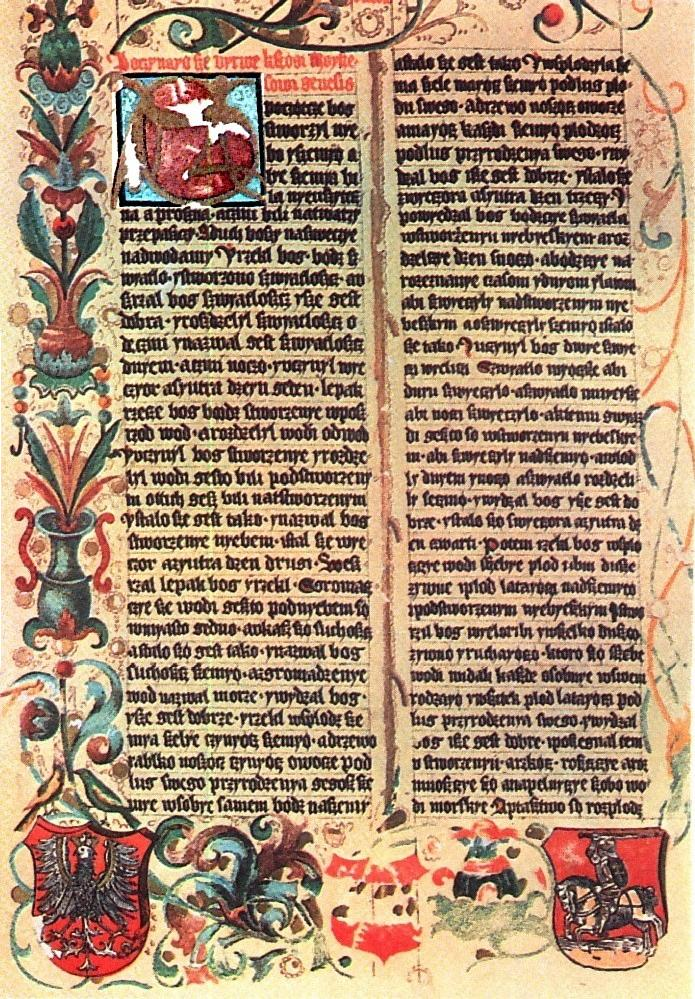
Queen Sofia's Bible, 1455

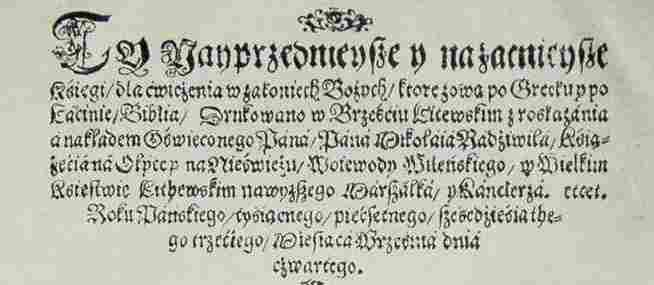
Dedication, Protestant Brest Bible, 1563

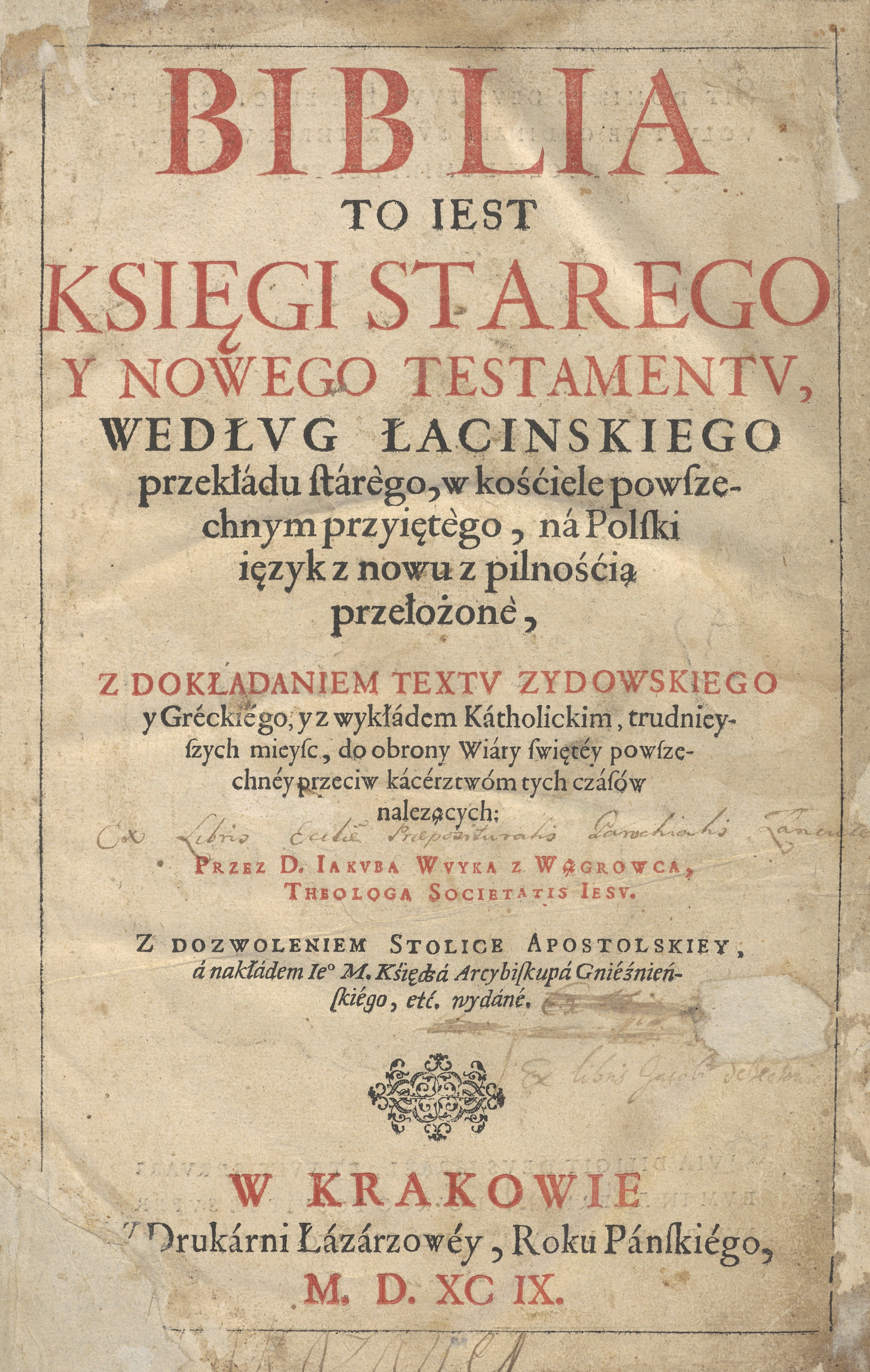
Title page of the Jakub Wujek Bible, 1599; a Catholic Bible

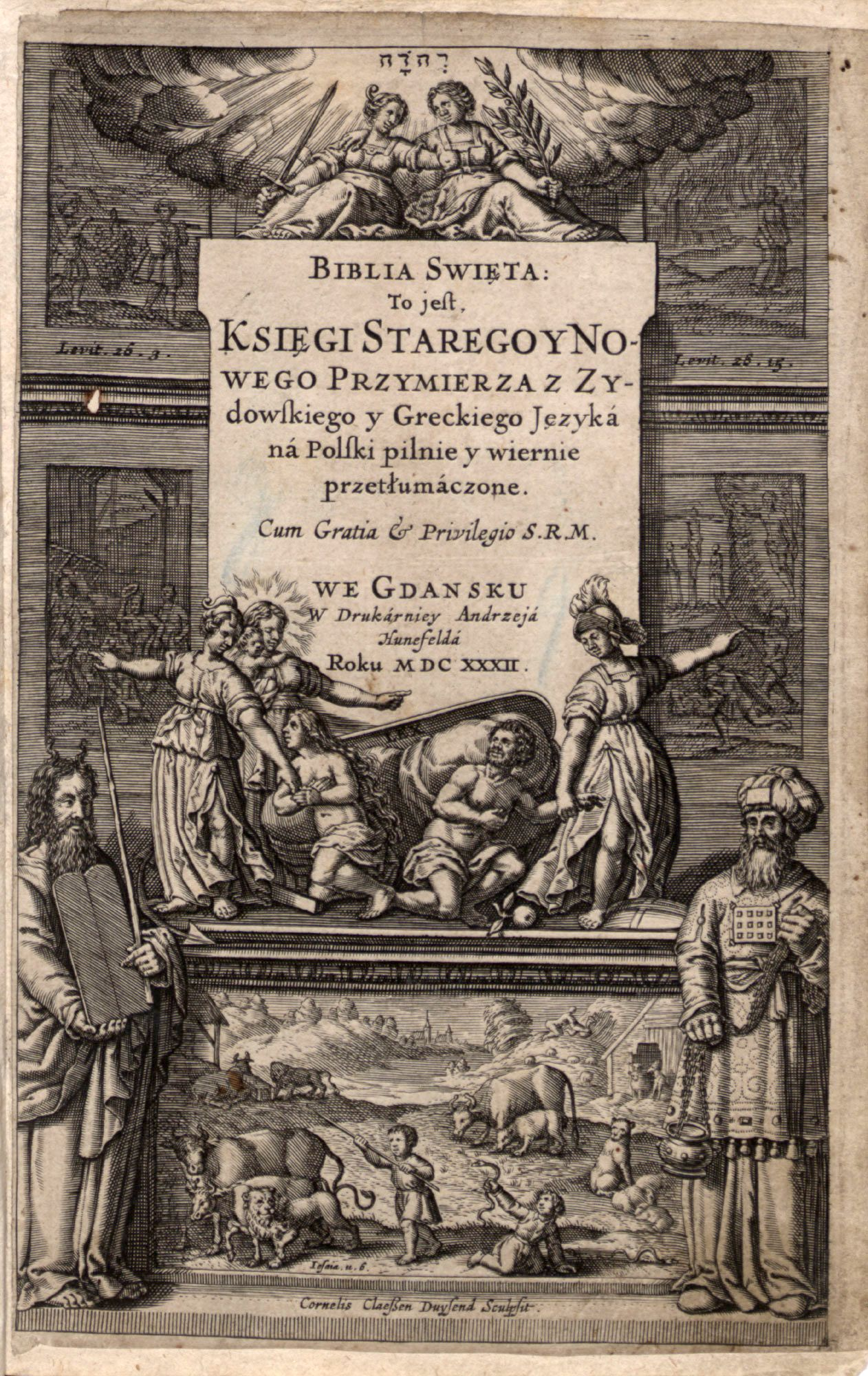
Title page, Protestant Gdańsk Bible, 1632

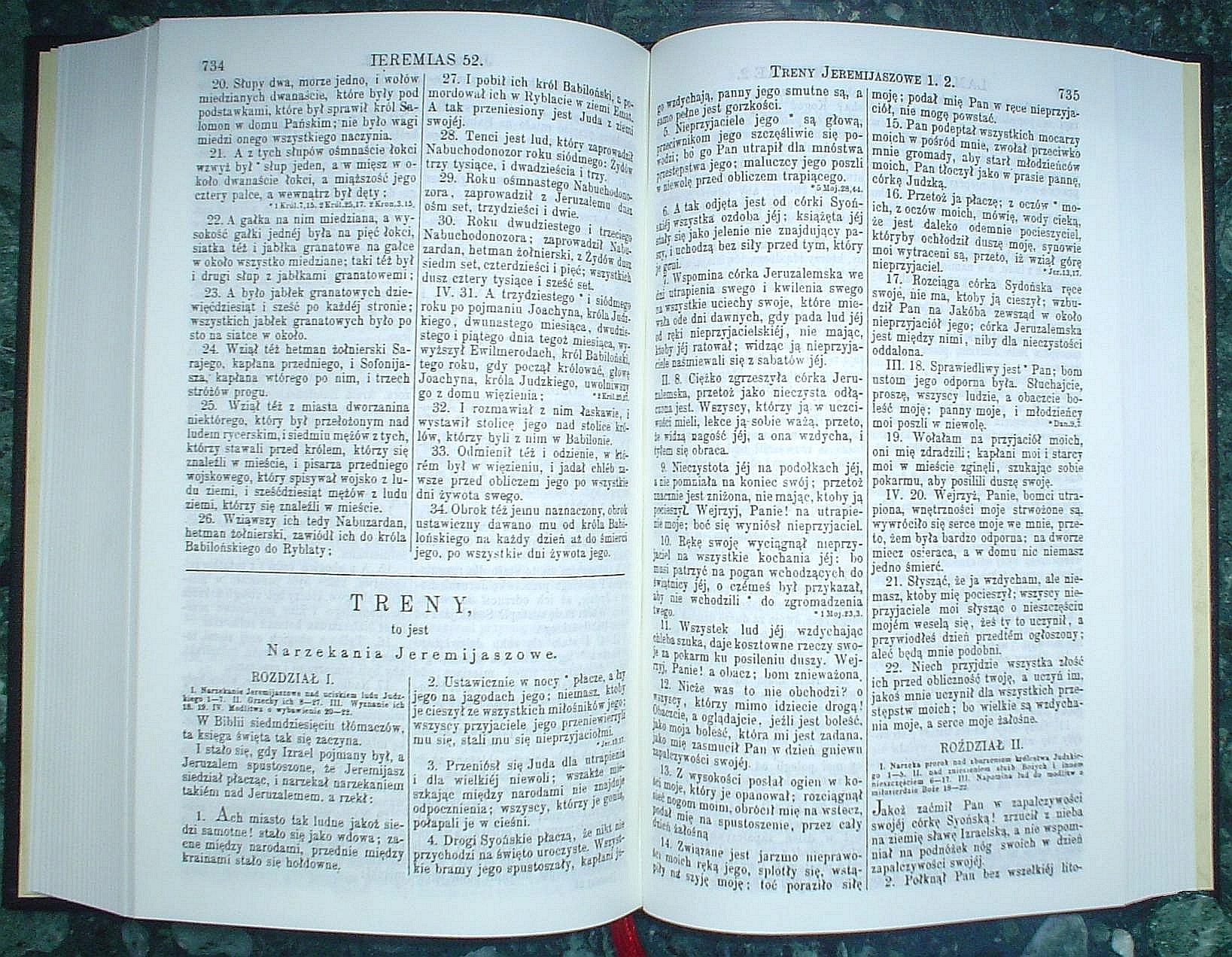
Protestant Gdańsk Bible, 1959

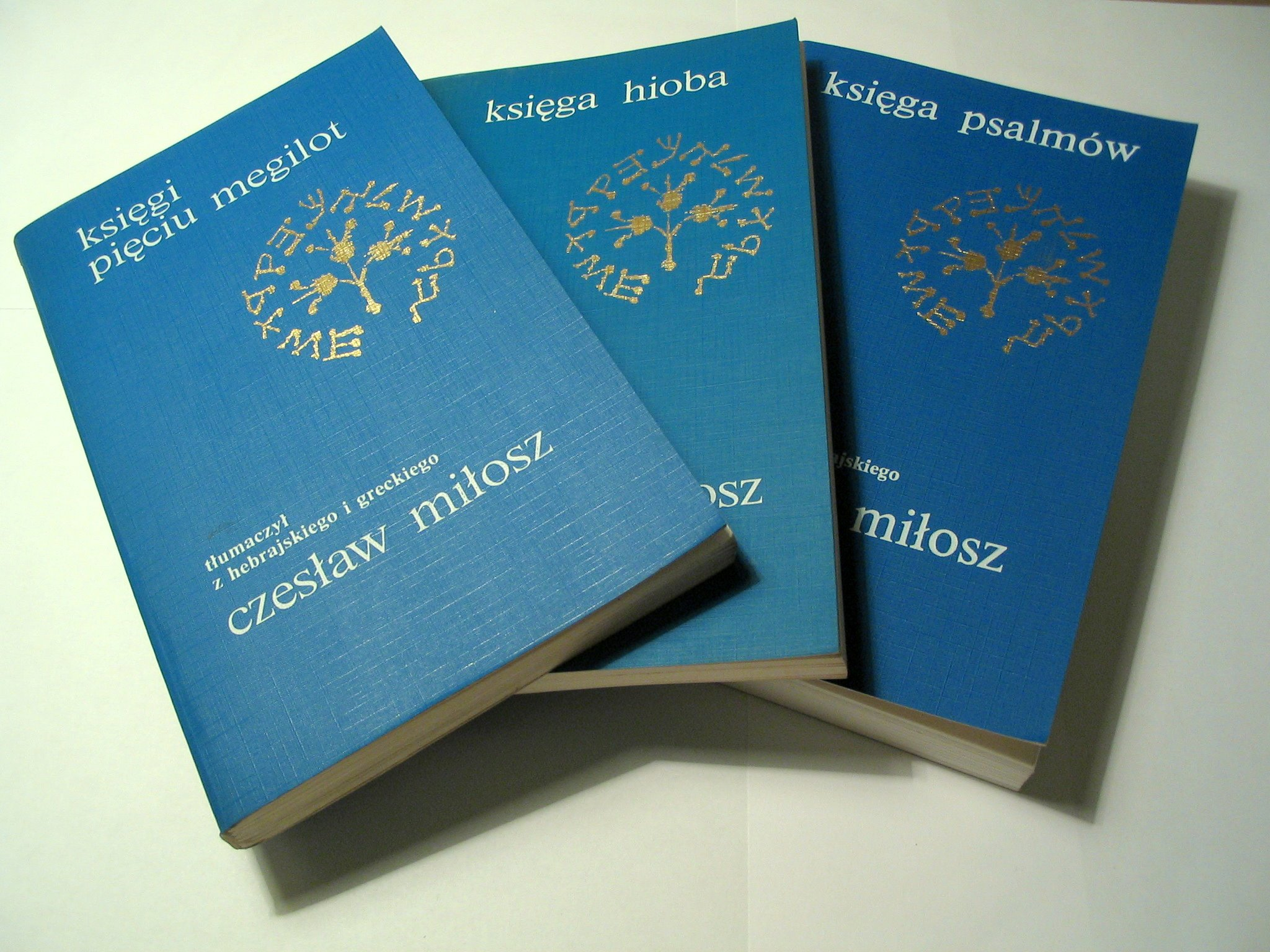
Translations by Czesław Miłosz, 1977-89

The earliest Bible translations into Polish date to the 13th century. The first full ones were completed in the 16th.

== Background ==
The history of translation of books of the Bible into Polish begins with the Psalter. The earliest recorded translations date to the 13th century, around 1280; however, none of these survive. The oldest surviving Polish translation of the Bible is the St. Florian's Psalter (Psałterz floriański), assumed to be a copy of that translation, itself a manuscript of the second half of the 14th century, in the abbey of Saint Florian, near Linz, in Latin, Polish and German.

A critical edition of the Polish part of the St. Florian's Psalter was published by Wladysław Nehring (Psalterii Florianensis pars Polonica, Poznań, 1883) with a very instructive introduction.

Slightly more recent than the St. Florian's Psalter is the Puławy Psalter (now in Kraków) dating from the end of the 15th century (published in facsimile, Poznań, 1880).

There were also a 16th-century translation of the New Testament, and more fragmentary translations, none of which have been preserved in their full form to the present.

In the mid-15th century, an incomplete Bible, the "Queen Sophia's Bible" (Biblia królowej Zofii, named after Sophia of Halshany, for whom it was intended, dating to before 1455), contains Genesis, Joshua, Ruth, Kings, Chronicles, Ezra, Nehemiah, II (III) Esdras, Tobit, and Judith.

With the Reformation, translation activity increased as the different confessions endeavored to supply their adherents with texts of the Bible. An effort to secure a Polish-language Bible for Lutherans was made by Duke Albert of Prussia in a letter directed in his name to Melanchthon.

== List of translations ==
=== Brest Bible (1563) ===
The Brest Bible, the first complete Bible in Polish, was commissioned by Mikołaj "the Black" Radziwiłł and printed in 1563 in Brest-Litovsk.

Jan Seklucjan (1510–1578), preacher at Königsberg, was commissioned to prepare a translation, and he published the New Testament at Königsberg in 1551 and 1552. The Polish Reformed (Calvinists) received the Bible through Prince Nicholas Radziwill (1515–65). A company of Polish and foreign theologians and scholars undertook the task, and, after six years' labor at the "Sarmatian Athens" at Pińczów, not far from Kraków, finished the translation of the Bible which was published at the expense of Radziwill in Brest-Litovsk, 1563 (hence called the Brest Bible Biblia Brzeska). The translators state that for the Old Testament they consulted besides the Hebrew text the ancient versions and different modern Latin ones.

=== Socinian versions ===
Two years after the Brest Bible was completed the Calvinist and Radical wings of the Reformed church split in 1565, and the Bible was suspect to both groups: The Calvinist Ecclesia Major suspected it of Arian interpretations; the Radical Ecclesia Minor complained that it was not accurate enough. Symon Budny, a Belarusian of the Judaizing wing of the Ecclesia Minor especially charged against the Brest Bible that it was not prepared according to the original texts, but after the Vulgate and other modern versions, and that the translators cared more for elegant Polish than for a faithful rendering. He undertook a new rendering, and his translation ("made anew from the Hebrew, Greek, and Latin into the Polish") was printed in 1572 at Nesvizh. As changes were introduced in the printing which were not approved by Budny, he disclaimed the New Testament and published another edition (1574) Zasłaŭje, and then finally a third edition (1589) where he withdrew some of his Judaizing and Talmudic readings. The charges which he made against the Brest Bible were also made against his own, and Budny's former colleague Marcin Czechowic of Lublin - who was concerned with Budny's preference for Hebrew over Greek sources - published the Polish Brethren's own edition of the New Testament (Cracow, 1577). The interesting preface states that Czechowic endeavored to make an accurate translation, but did not suppress his Socinian ideas; e.g., he used "immersion" instead of "baptism." A further truly Socinian Racovian New Testament was published by Valentinus Smalcius, a pupil of Fausto Sozzini (Racovian Academy, 1606).

=== Gdańsk Bible (1632) ===
The Brest Bible was superseded by the so-called Gdańsk Bible, which finally became the Bible of all Evangelical Poles. At the synod in Ożarowice, 1600, a new edition of the Bible was proposed and the work was given to the Reformed minister Martin Janicki, who had already translated the Bible from the original texts. In 1603 the printing of this translation was decided upon, after the work had been carefully revised. The work of revision was entrusted to men of the Reformed and Lutheran confessions and members of the Moravian Church (1604), especially to Daniel Mikołajewski (died 1633), superintendent of the Reformed churches in Great Poland, and Jan Turnowski, senior of the Moravian Church in Great Poland (died 1629).

After it had been compared with the Janicki translation, the Brest, the Bohemian, Pagnini's Latin, and the Vulgate, the new rendering was ordered printed. The Janicki translation as such has not been printed, and it is difficult to state how much of it is contained in the new Bible. The New Testament was first published at Gdańsk, 1606, and very often during the 16th and 17th centuries. The complete Bible was issued in 1632, and often since. The Gdańsk Bible differs so much from that of Brest that it may be regarded as a new translation. It is erroneously called also the Bible of Pavel Paliurus (1569–1632) (a Moravian, senior of the Evangelical Churches in Great Poland, d. 1632); but he had no part in the work.

=== Jakub Wujek's Bible (1599) ===
For the Roman Catholics the Bible was translated from the Vulgate by Jan Nicz of Lwów (Jan Leopolita, hence the Biblia Leopolity) Kraków, 1561, 1574, and 1577. This Bible was superseded by the new translation of the Jesuit Jakub Wujek (c.1540 - Kraków 1593) that became known as the Jakub Wujek Bible. Wujek criticized the Leopolita and non-Catholic Bible versions and spoke very favorably of the Polish of the Brest Bible, but asserted that it was full of heresies and of errors in translation. The first copies of Wujek's New Testament appeared in 1593 - containing Wujek's "teachings and warnings" regarding the Protestant versions. Czechowic went into print with a booklet accusing Wujek of plagiarism and following the Latin over the Greek. With the approbation of the Holy See the New Testament was first published at Kraków, 1593, and the Old Testament in 1599, after Wujek's death. This Bible (Biblia Wujka) has often been reprinted. Wujek's translation follows, in the main, the Vulgate.

=== Modern versions ===
Today the official and most popular Bible in Poland is the Millennium Bible (Biblia Tysiąclecia) first published in 1965. Other popular Catholic translations include the Poznań Bible (Biblia Poznańska, 1975) and Biblia Warszawsko-Praska (1997).

Polish Protestants had been widely using the Gdańsk Bible (Biblia Gdańska), until they prepared their modern translation: Warsaw Bible (Biblia Warszawska) in 1975.

Jehovah's Witnesses have translated their New World Translation of the Holy Scriptures into Polish, as Przekład Nowego Świata (New Testament: 1994, Bible: 1997).

The Millennium Bible (Biblia Tysiąclecia), was published in 1965 for the millennium of the 966 C.E. Baptism of Poland, the traditional date of Poland's statehood.

In 2009, a grammatical update of the Gdańsk Bible New Testament, Uwspółcześniona Biblia Gdańska (UBG), containing cross references was published by the Foundation Wrota Nadziei in Toruń. The translation and modernization of archaisms found in the old Gdańsk Bible was done by a team of born-again Polish and American Christians.

== Text examples ==
The same background color means exactly the same text for the given verse.

	Genesis 1:1–3	John 3:16
Brest Bible (1563) – Biblia brzeska	(1) Naprzód stworzył Bóg niebo i ziemię. (2) A ziemia była niekształtowna i próżna i były ciemności nad przepaściami, a duch Boży przenaszał się nad wodami. (3) Tedy rzekł Bóg: Niech będzie światłość! I stała się światłość.	Abowiemci Bóg tak umiłował świat, iż Syna swego jednorodzonego dał, aby wszelki, kto wierzy weń, nie zginął, lecz aby miał żywot wieczny.
Jakub Wujek Bible (1599) – Biblia Jakuba Wujka	(1) Na początku stworzył Bóg niebo i ziemię. (2) A ziemia była pusta i próżna i ciemności były nad głębokością, a Duch Boży unaszał się nad wodami. (3) I rzekł Bóg: Niech się zstanie światłość: i zstała się światłość.	Abowiem tak Bóg umiłował świat, że Syna swego jednorodzonego dał, aby wszelki, kto wierzy weń, nie zginął, ale miał żywot wieczny.
Gdańsk Bible (1632) – pl:Biblia gdańska	(1) Na początku stworzył Bóg niebo i ziemię. (2) A ziemia była niekształtowna i próżna, i ciemność była nad przepaścią, a Duch Boży unaszał się nad wodami. (3) I rzekł Bóg: Niech będzie światłość; i stała się światłość.	Albowiem tak Bóg umiłował świat, że Syna swego jednorodzonego dał, aby każdy, kto weń wierzy, nie zginął, ale miał żywot wieczny.
Millennium Bible (1965) – Biblia Tysiąclecia	(1) Na początku Bóg stworzył niebo i ziemię. (2) Ziemia zaś była bezładem i pustkowiem: ciemność była nad powierzchnią bezmiaru wód, a Duch Boży unosił się nad wodami. (3) Wtedy Bóg rzekł: Niechaj się stanie światłość! I stała się światłość.	Tak bowiem Bóg umiłował świat, że Syna swego Jednorodzonego dał, aby każdy, kto w Niego wierzy, nie zginął, ale miał życie wieczne.
Warsaw Bible (1975) – pl:Biblia warszawska	(1) Na początku stworzył Bóg niebo i ziemię. (2) A ziemia była pustkowiem i chaosem; ciemność była nad otchłanią, a Duch Boży unosił się nad powierzchnią wód. (3) I rzekł Bóg: Niech stanie się światłość. I stała się światłość.	Albowiem tak Bóg umiłował świat, że Syna swego jednorodzonego dał, aby każdy, kto weń wierzy, nie zginął, ale miał żywot wieczny.
pl:Biblia poznańska (1975)	(1) Na początku Bóg stworzył niebo i ziemię. (2) A ziemia była zupełnym pustkowiem, ciemność zalegała głębię wód, a tchnienie Boże unosiło się nad wodami. (3) I rzekł Bóg: Niech powstanie światło! I światło powstało.	Albowiem Bóg tak umiłował świat, że wydał swego Syna Jednorodzonego, aby każdy, kto w Niego wierzy, nie zginął, ale miał życie wieczne.
pl:Słowo Życia (1989)		Tak bowiem Bóg umiłował świat, że oddał swego jedynego Syna, aby każdy, kto w Niego wierzy, nie zginął, ale miał życie wieczne.
pl:Biblia warszawsko-praska (1997)	(1) Na początku stworzył Bóg niebo i ziemię. (2) Ziemia była [na początku] bezładna i pusta: ciemności zalegały bezmiar przestrzeni i [tylko] Duch Boży unosił się nad wodami. (3) Powiedział tedy Bóg: Niech się stanie światło ! I stało się światło.	Tak bowiem Bóg umiłował świat, że Syna jednorodzonego wydał, aby każdy, kto w Niego wierzy, nie zginął, lecz miał życie wieczne.
pl:Biblia Paulistów – Edycja Świętego Pawła (2008)	(1) Na początku Bóg stworzył niebo i ziemię. (2) A ziemia była bezładną pustką. Ciemność zalegała nad bezmiarem wód, a duch Boży unosił się nad wodami. (3) Bóg rzekł: "Niech się stanie światłość". I stała się światłość.	Tak bardzo bowiem Bóg umiłował świat, że dał swojego jednorodzonego Syna, aby każdy, kto w Niego wierzy, nie zginął, lecz miał życie wieczne.
Updated Gdańsk Bible (2009) – pl:Uwspółcześniona Biblia gdańska	(1) Na początku Bóg stworzył niebo i ziemię. (2) A ziemia była bezkształtna i pusta i ciemność była nad głębią, a Duch Boży unosił się nad wodami. (3) I Bóg powiedział: Niech stanie się światłość. I stała się światłość.	Tak bowiem Bóg umiłował świat, że dał swego jednorodzonego Syna, aby każdy, kto w niego wierzy, nie zginął, ale miał życie wieczne.
pl:Nowa Biblia gdańska (2012)	(1) Na początku Bóg stworzył niebiosa i ziemię. (2) Zaś ziemia była niewidoczna, bezładna i ciemność nad otchłanią; a Duch Boga unosił się nad wodami. (3) I Bóg powiedział: Niech się stanie światło. Więc stało się światło.	Bowiem Bóg tak umiłował świat, że dał swego jednorodzonego Syna, aby każdy, kto w niego wierzy nie zginął, ale miał życie wieczne.
Biblia Mesjańska (2013)	(1) Na początku Bóg uczynił niebo i ziemię. (2) Ale ziemia była niewidoczna i nie zabudowana, i ciemność była nad otchłanią, a Duch Boży poruszał się nad wodą. (3) I rzekł Bóg: Niech stanie się światłość. I stała się światłość.	Albowiem tak Bóg umiłował świat, że Syna swego jednorodzonego dał, aby każdy, kto weń wierzy, nie zginął, ale miał żywot wieczny.
pl:Biblia w przekładzie Ewangelicznego Instytutu Biblijnego (2016) – Przekład Literacki	(1) Na początku stworzył Bóg niebo i ziemię. (2) Ziemia zaś była bezładna i pusta. Ciemność rozciągała się nad otchłanią, a Duch Boży unosił się nad powierzchnią wód. (3) Wtedy Bóg powiedział: Niech się stanie światło! I stało się światło.	Bóg bowiem tak bardzo ukochał świat, że dał swego Jedynego Syna, aby każdy, kto w Niego wierzy, nie zginął, ale miał życie wieczne.
pl:Biblia toruńska (2017)		W ten właśnie sposób Bóg umiłował świat, że dał swojego jednorodzonego Syna, aby każdy, wierzący w Niego, nie zginął, ale miał życie wieczne.
New World Translation of the Holy Scriptures – Biblia w przekładzie Nowego Świata (2018)	(1) Na początku Bóg stworzył niebiosa i ziemię. (2) A ziemia była bezkształtna i pusta i ciemność panowała na powierzchni głębiny wodnej; a czynna siła Boża przemieszczała się tu i tam nad powierzchnią wód. (3) I Bóg przemówił: "Niech powstanie światło". Wtedy powstało światło.	Albowiem Bóg tak bardzo umiłował świat, że dał swego jednorodzonego Syna, aby nikt, kto w niego wierzy, nie został zgładzony, lecz miał życie wieczne.
pl:Biblia Ewangeliczna, Przekład dosłowny (2018)		Tak bowiem Bóg umiłował świat, że dał jednorodzonego Syna, aby każdy, kto w Niego wierzy, nie zginął, ale miał życie wieczne.
pl:Biblia lubelska (2022)	(1) Na początku stworzył Bóg niebo i ziemię. (2) Ziemia była bezładną i pustą. Ciemności zalegały powierzchnię chaosu, a Duch Boży unosił się nad wodami. (3) Wtedy rzekł Bóg: „Niech się stanie światłość”. I stała się światłość.	Tak bowiem Bóg ukochał świat, że dał Jednorodzonego swego Syna, aby każdy, kto w Niego wierzy, nie zginął, lecz miał życie wieczne.
