= Sankt Florian Psalter =

- National Library of Poland, Warsaw
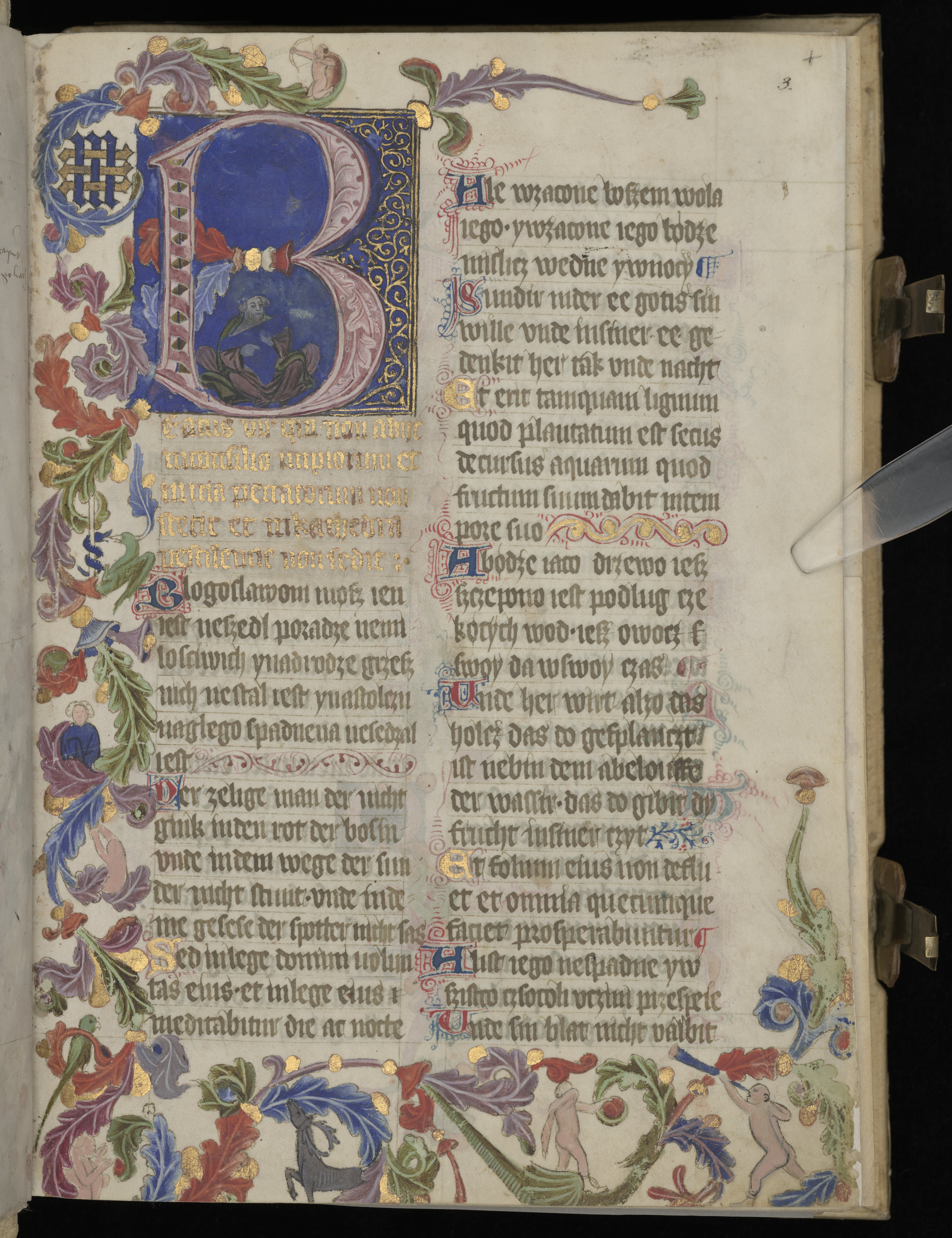
- Beginning of Psalm 1, with a historiated initial "B" containing an image of King David, on folio 3 recto
- Also known as: Psalterium trilingue; rps III 8002
- Type: Psalter
- Date: Between 1370 and early 15th century
- Place of origin: Kłodzko and Kraków, Poland
- Language(s): Latin, Polish, German
- Illuminated by: Master of Hutter's Bible
- Patron: Queen Hedwig of Poland
- Material: Vellum
- Size: 32 cm × 22.5 cm (12.6 in × 8.9 in); 297+IV folios
- Format: Double columns
- Script: Gothic minuscule
- Contents: Trilingual translation of the Book of Psalms
- Previously kept: St. Florian Monastery, Sankt Florian, Austria
- Discovered: 1827

The Sankt Florian Psalter or Saint Florian Psalter (Latin: Psalterium florianense or Psalterium trilingue, German: Florianer Psalter or Florianspsalter, Polish: Psałterz floriański or Psałterz św. Jadwigi) is a brightly illuminated trilingual manuscript psalter, written around 1400 in Latin, Polish and German. The Polish text is the oldest known translation of the Book of Psalms into that language. Its author, first owners, and place of origin are still not certain. It was named after St. Florian Monastery in Sankt Florian, a town in Austria, where it was discovered.

== Origins and history ==
It is not known exactly who was original owner of the book. Most likely it belonged to a female member of the House of Anjou (wife or daughter of Louis I of Hungary), or it was made for Jadwiga of Poland. Its creator is also unknown, and even its place of origin is uncertain, with scholars seeing either Bohemia (Kłodzko) or Lesser Poland (Kraków) (or both) as the likely regions of origin. The text contains several examples of central Lesser Polish dialect, and some scholars suggested that the work might have been carried out or at least influenced by bishop Piotr Wysz.

Polish historian of literature, Julian Krzyżanowski, suggested that the text is a copy of an older work, perhaps the St. Kinga's Psalter (whose very existence is still disputed by scholars) though admitted that there's scant evidence for this.

It was rediscovered by local librarian, Father Josef Chmel, in 1827 in St. Florian Monastery, in the town of Sankt Florian near Linz, Austria. It first published in print in Vienna in 1834, by Polish publisher Stanislaw Jan Borkowski. In 1931 the psalter was purchased by Polish government for the National Library of Poland. During World War II it was evacuated to Romania and later to France and Canada, and returned to Poland in 1959. By 1939, whole book was published in Lwow by Ludwik Biernacki.

Currently, the book is kept at the National Library of Poland in Warsaw. From May 2024, the manuscript is presented at a permanent exhibition in the Palace of the Commonwealth.

== Composition ==
The manuscript contains a trilingual translation of the Psalms into Latin, Polish and German, as well as two prologues by Ludolph of Saxony, the Athanasian Creed, and musical score for several canticles. It is richly illustrated with astrological and Christian symbology.

The text is divided into three parts:

- part one, psalms 1–101,
- part two, psalms 102–106,
- part three, psalms 107–150.

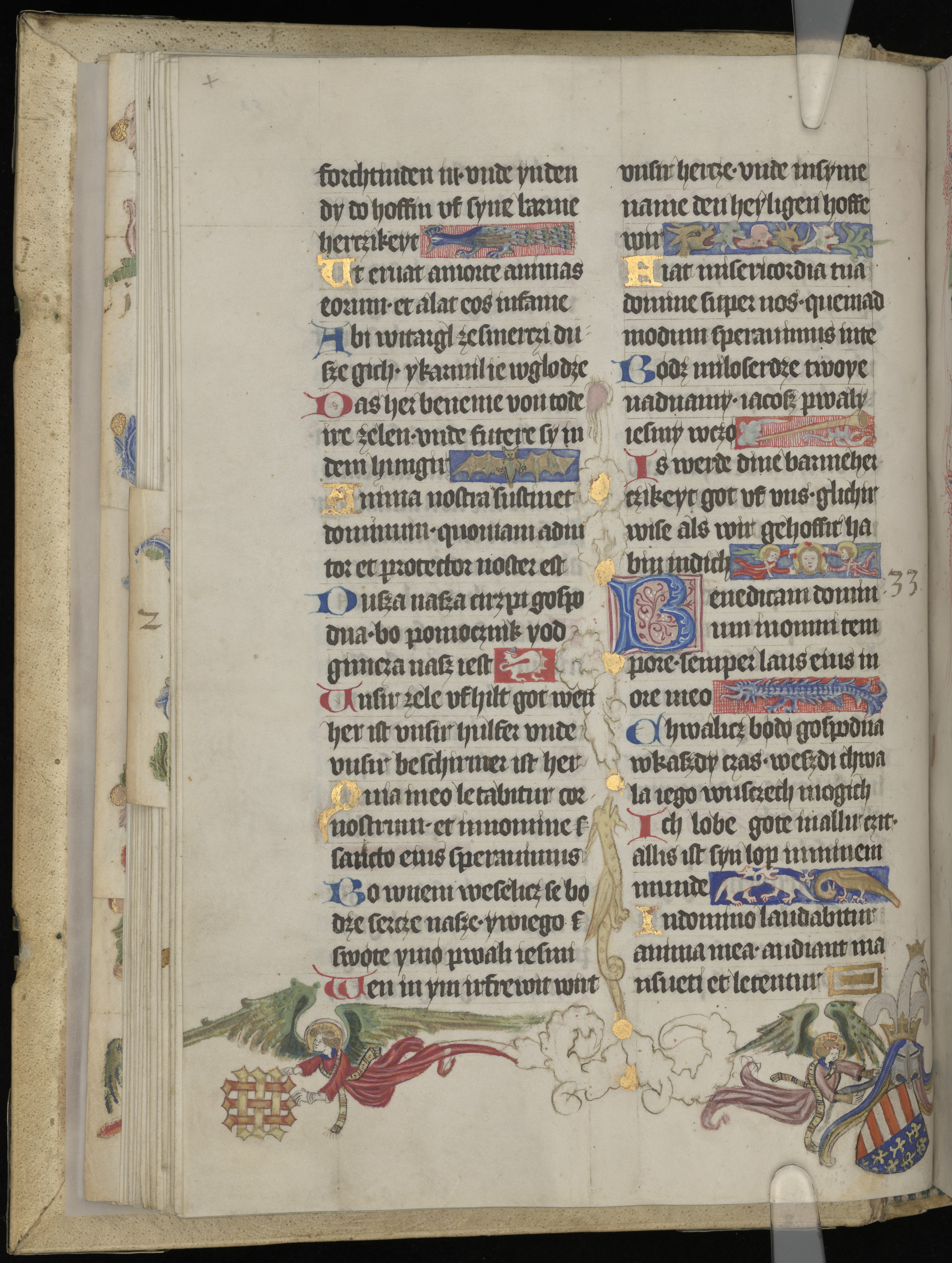
At the bottom of folio 53 verso there are images of angels supporting a knot of interwoven letters "m" and the coat of arms of the Hungarian branch of the Capetian House of Anjou, both symbols associated with Queen Hedwig of Poland. Other illuminations on the page include images of a peacock, a bat, and wyverns.

Each part was created at a different place in time. The first part was probably written in late 14th century, while second and third were written in the 15th century. One date given for the year that the work on the Psalter begun is 1398; another – 1370s. In these parts, influences of the Czech language are visible, as probably the psalter was patterned after a similar Czech publication.

The book has a format of 34,5 × 24,5 cm and a weight of about 4 kilograms. The material used was parchment.

== Significance ==
It is the oldest surviving translation of the Books of Psalms into the Polish language. The translation from Latin into Polish, however, is considered very poor. The psalter is also the oldest Polish language cultural artifact (zabytek) surviving to modern day in intact form.

== See also ==
- Bible translations into Polish
- Millennium Bible
- Bible translations into Slavic languages

== Sources ==
- Grzebiennik, Małgorzata (2003). Skórka, Stanisław (ed.). "Psałterz Floriański". Historia Książki i Bibliotek (in Polish). Archived from the original on 2015-10-03.
- Kaleta, Marta (2013). "Psałterz floriański: najstarszy polski przekład Biblii?" [Sankt Florian Psalter: the oldest Polish Bible translation?]. ePatmos.pl (in Polish).
- Ożóg, Krzysztof (2013). "The Intellectual Circles in Cracow at the Turn of the Fourteenth and Fifteenth Centuries and the Issue of the Creation of the Sankt Florian Psalter". Polish Libraries. 1.
- Sekściński, Adam (2005). "Przekłady polskie – Psałterz floriański" [Polish translation – the Sankt Florian Psalter]. Wiara.pl (in Polish).
- Tchórzewska-Kabata, Halina, ed. (2003). Nad złoto droższe: Skarby Biblioteki Narodowej [More precious than gold: Treasures of the National Library] (PDF) (in Polish). Warszawa: Biblioteka Narodowa. ISBN 83-7009-433-3.
