= Pagnini =

Pagnini is an Italian surname. Notable people with the surname include:

- Eugenio Pagnini (1905–1993), Italian modern pentathlete
- Giovanni Pagnini (d. 18th century), Italian mathematician
- Luca Antonio Pagnini (1737 - 1814), Italian translator of Greco-Roman classics
- Marta Pagnini (born 1991), Italian rhythmic gymnast
- Santi Pagnini or Santes Pagnino (1470–1541), Italian philologist and Biblical scholar
