= Jakub Wujek Bible =

16th-century Catholic translation of the Bible into Polish by Jakub Wujek

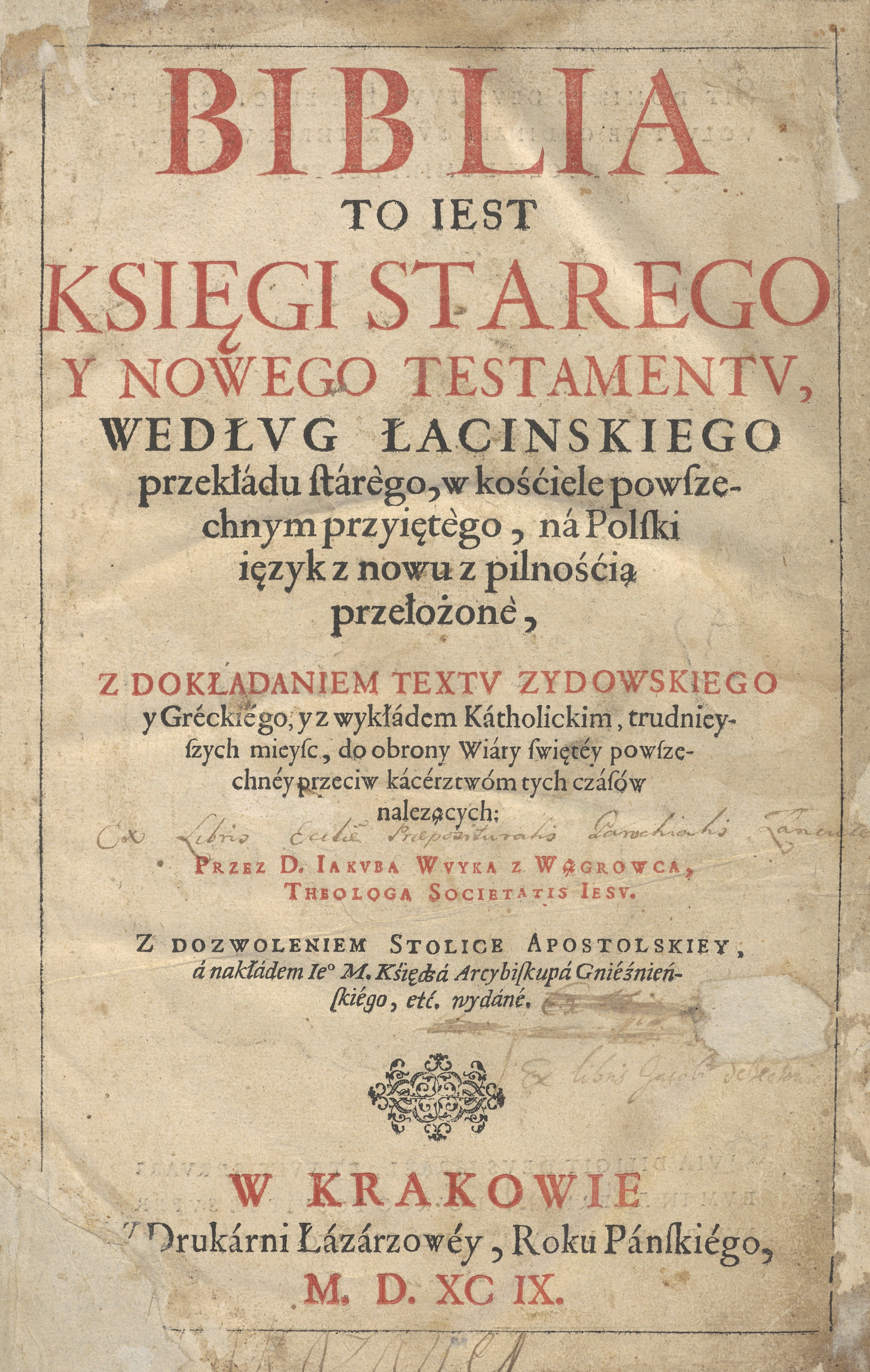
- Cover page of edition from 1599
- Full name: Biblia to iest Księgi Starego y Nowego Przymierza według Łacińskiego przekładu starego, w kościele powszechnym przyiętego, na Polski ięzyk z nowu z pilnością przełożone, z dokładaniem textu Żydowskiego y Greckiego, y z wykładem Katholickim, trudnieyszych miejsc, do obrony wiary swiętej powszechnej przeciw kacerstwóm tych czasów należących: przez D. Iakuba Wuyka z Wągrowca, Theologa Societatis Iesu.
- Language: Polish
- NT published: 1593
- Complete Bible published: 1599
- Online as: Jakub Wujek Bible at Wikisource
- Apocrypha: yes
- Authorship: Jakub Wujek
- Textual basis: Sixto-Clementine Vulgate
- Genesis 1:1–3 Na początku stworzył Bóg niebo y źiemię. A źiemiá byłá pusta i próżna: y ciemności były nád głębokośćią: á Duch Boży unaszał się nád wodámi. Y rzékł Bóg: „Niech się zstanie świátłość.” John 3:16 Abowiem ták Bóg umiłował świát, że Syná swégo iednorodzonégo dał: áby wszelki kto wierzy weń, nie zginął, ále miał żywot wieczny.

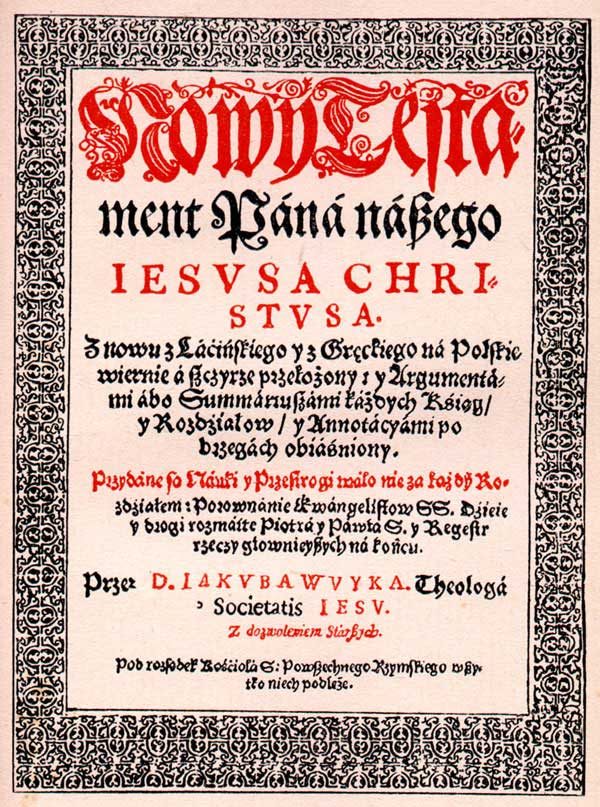
Cover page of first edition of the New Testament from 1593

The Jakub Wujek Bible (Polish: Biblia Jakuba Wujka) was the main Polish Bible translation used in the liturgy of the Roman Catholic Church in Poland from the late 16th century till the mid-20th century.

The translation was done by a Polish Jesuit, Jakub Wujek (after whom it is commonly named), with the permission of Pope Gregory XIII and the Jesuit Order. It was based on the sixto-clementine revision of the Vulgate. The first edition was completed in 1593, but the full authorized edition was ready only two years after Wujek's death, in 1599.

== History ==
The full title of the Bible is: Biblia to iest Księgi Starego y Nowego Przymierza według Łacińskiego przekładu starego, w kościele powszechnym przyiętego, na Polski ięzyk z nowu z pilnością przełożone, z dokładaniem textu Żydowskiego y Greckiego, y z wykładem Katholickim, trudnieyszych miejsc, do obrony wiary swiętej powszechnej przeciw kacerstwóm tych czasów należących: przez D. Iakuba Wuyka z Wągrowca, Theologa Societatis Iesu. (Bible, that is, the Books of the Old and New Testament according to old Latin translation, in universal church accepted, translated anew to the Polish language with attention, with additions of Jewish and Greek texts, with Catholic exposition of difficult passages, for the defence of the universal holy faith against the heretics of these times, by D. Iakub Wuyek of Wągrowiec, Theologa Societatis Iesu.)

In 1584, Polish Jesuits and the primate of Poland, Stanisław Karnkowski, decided that a new Polish translation of the Bible was needed, as the previous Leopolita's Bible from 1561 was not seen as adequate, and contemporary Protestant translations were seen as better. Jakub Wujek, already known for excellent translations of parts of the Bible in his homilies, was chosen to head the task. The first edition of the New Testament was ready in 1593. The translation was accompanied by footnotes, explanations and polemics.

The Clementine Vulgate, issued in 1592, caused a delay in the translation, as it had to be checked for consistency with the new Latin version. Wujek finished the work on the New Testament, revised with the Clementine Vulgate in 1594, and on the Old Testament in 1596; the works were immediately published. The final version of Wujek's Bible was ready in 1599, after corrections from a Jesuit commission, two years after Wujek's death in 1597.

The Jakub Wujek Bible replaced the Leopolita's Bible (1561), and was in turn replaced by the Millennium Bible (1965).

Some modern scholars tend to rank the first edition, from 1593/1594, over that from 1599.

== Importance ==
Wujek's Bible is widely recognized as an excellent translation, one of the most important works of the Renaissance in Poland, and a major work advancing the written Polish language. Various parts of it were quoted by Polish poets, including Adam Mickiewicz and Juliusz Słowacki. It would also serve as a major Polish-language Catholic Bible till the Millennium Bible of the 20th century (1965) and was also an important source for the first Polish-language Protestant Bible, the Gdańsk Bible of 1632.
