= Bible of Queen Sophia =

15th-century, earliest translation of the Bible into Polish

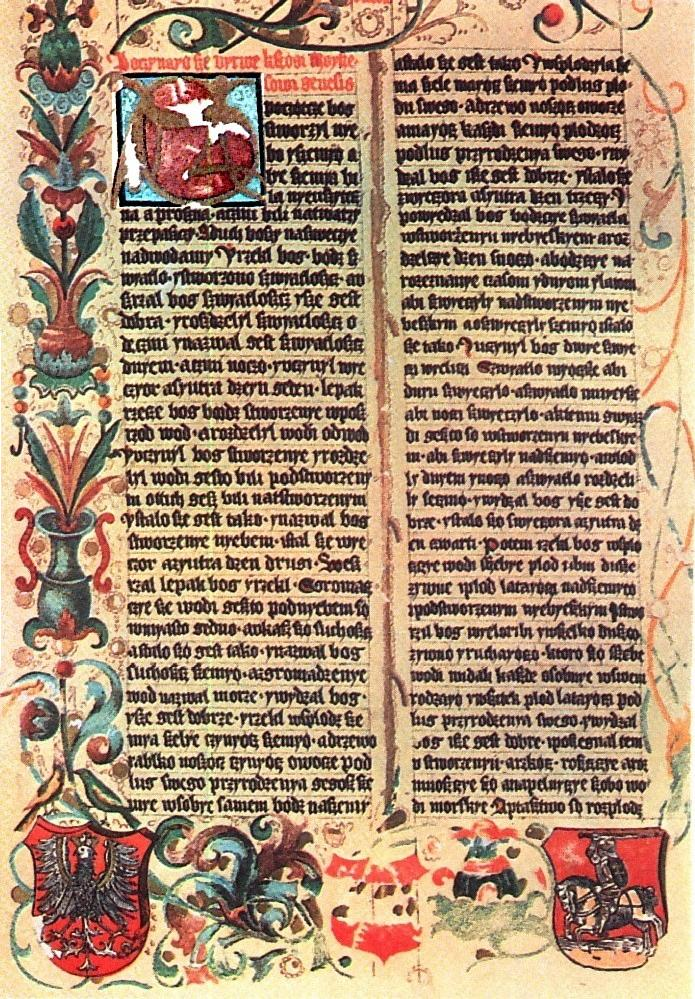
A page from Queen Sophia's Bible

The Bible of Queen Sophia (or Queen Sophia's Bible, Polish: Biblia królowej Zofii, also Sárospatak Bible, Biblia Szaroszp(a)otacka) is the oldest surviving translation of the Old Testament into the Polish language and the first complete translation of the Bible into Polish. The work is seen as a significant milestone in the history of the Polish language, and the most extensive example of the medieval Old Polish language.

The bible was commissioned by Sophia of Halshany, wife of the Polish king Jogaila. Queen Sophia did not know Latin, and wished for a bible she could read herself. The translation started in 1433 and ceased in 1455; the work was not fully finished (some illustrations were completed only two centuries later). The primary author of the translation was the Queen's chaplain, Andrzej z Jaszowic.

A copy of the bible was held by the library at Sárospatak in Hungary from at least 1708; hence the other name for this book. The bible was composed of two parchment folios numbering 470 pages in total. Only 185 pages of the first folio survived to the 19th century, as the second had been destroyed to provide bindings for other books. The first volume was also lost (presumed destroyed) during World War I, but Ludwik Bernacki published a facsimile edition in 1930. Several pages were recovered during the interwar period but most were lost during World War II. Today only two and a half pages remain: two at the University of Wrocław and half a page at the National Library of the Czech Republic in Prague.

The text of the bible is known through reproductions. The first complete printed edition of the work was in 1871, through the effort of Antoni Małecki.

== See also ==
- Bible translations into Polish
