= Jakub Wujek =

Polish writer

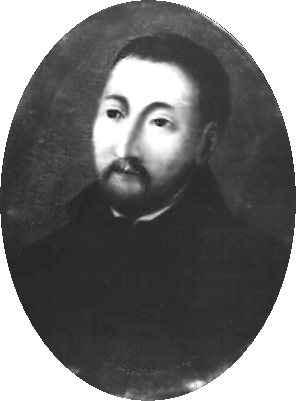
- Born: 1541; Wągrowiec, Poland
- Died: 27 April 1597 (aged 58); Kraków

Jakub Wujek (1541 – 27 April 1597) was a Polish Jesuit, religious writer, Doctor of Theology, Vice-Chancellor of the Vilnius Academy and translator of the Bible into Polish.

He is well-known for his translation of the Bible into Polish: the Wujek Bible.

== Life ==
Wujek studied at the Cistercian School in Wągrowiec and continued with humanities and classical science studies in Silesia where he proved himself exceptionally talented, especially in languages. On his parents' advice he moved to Kraków from Silesia in 1558 and studied classics, where in 1559 he received a master's degree in Philosophy.

He began to teach at the bishop of Kraków's, Jakub Uchański, school in Kraków. When Uchanski was made Primate he sent Wujek to the Jesuit's College in Vienna. Here Wujek completed a master's degree in Philosophy and supplemented his philosophical studies with mathematical lectures and learning Greek.

In 1565 he joined the Jesuit Order in Vienna and after novitiate he began theological studies at Collegium Romanum where he received a doctor's degree. After two years in Rome he returned to Poland to Pułtusk, where he became a lecturer in Jesuits’ College. He was ordained a priest in 1568 in Pułtusk and from that moment he devoted himself the undertaking of preaching and writing. In 1571–1578 as Chancellor he organized the Jesuit College in Poznań and became a rector. In 1578–1580 he was Chancellor of the Vilnius Academy. In 1579–1584 he founded the Jesuits province of Cluj in Transylvania and was the first Chancellor of the Cluj Academy.

Wujek published two books: Postylla katoliczna (Postylla catholica, 1573), Postylla mniejsza (Lesser Postilla), "Żywoty" (Lives), "Pasja" (Passion) and others.

In 1584 the authorities of the Society of Jesus commissioned Wujek to translate the Bible from Vulgate - St. Jerome's Latin translation of the Bible which was sanctioned by the Council of Trent as the official Bible of the Roman Catholic Church in 1546. The first official version of the Vulgate, known as the Sistine Vulgate, was published on Pope Sixtus V's recommendation in 1590 and was preceded by Sixtus V's bull "Aetenus Ille". A revised edition of this Vulgate, known as the Clementine Vulgate, was officially published along with the bull "Com Sacrorum" by pope Clement VIII in 1592.

Wujek's translation of the New Testament first appeared in 1593, complete with "teachings and warnings" regarding the Brest Bible and the Socinian versions of Symon Budny and Marcin Czechowic. Czechowic accused Wujek of plagiarism, and Marcin Łaszcz responded on Wujek's behalf.

In terms of language, Wujek continued to write in his predecessors' style. His translation is precise and multilateral; its language is easy and clear whilst at the same time serious and dignified. Wujek's translation, known as the Wujek Bible, replaced the Leopolita Bible and served as the fundamental Polish Catholic translation for over three centuries.

Jakub Wujek was buried in the grounds of Saint Barbara's Church in Kraków.
