= Giovanni Pagnini =

Maltese mathematician and hydrographer

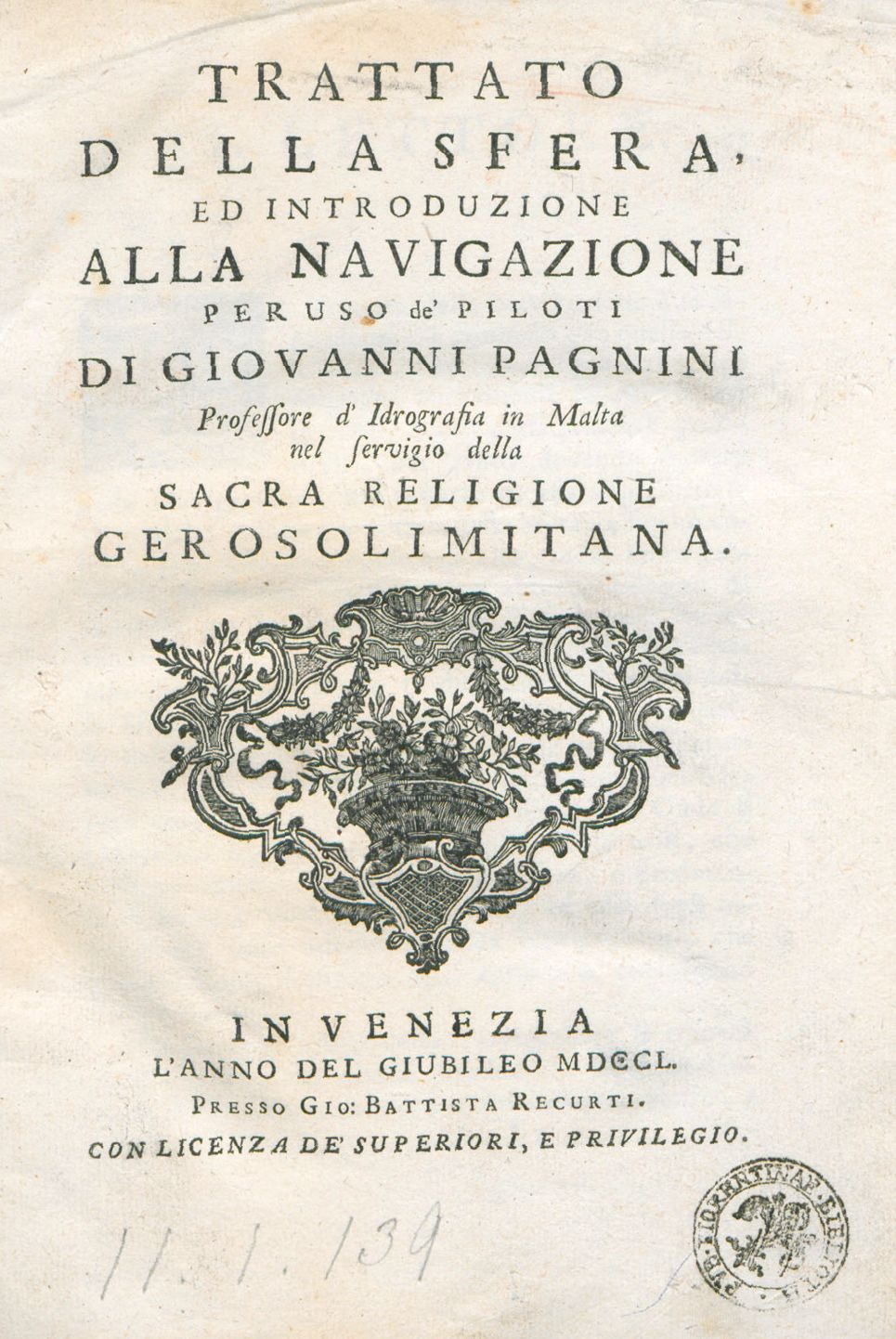
Trattato della sfera, title page

Giovanni Pagnini was an 18th-century Maltese mathematician and hydrographer.

He was a member of the Knights Hospitaller.

Born in Lucca, Italy, Pagnini came to Malta known as the "Hydrographer of the Order" and the knowledge he brought was instrumental in the foundation of Malta's School of Navigation.

Pagnini mainly expanded on theoretical mathematics, but his text Compasso di Proporzioni is focused on detailing new compass-like tools (ex: "La Linea Aritmetica", "La Linea dei Piani[o] Linea Geometrica", "La Linea Cubica [o] Linea de Solidi") for construction and navigation purposes.

== Works ==
- Pagnini, Giovanni (1724). Compendio di Trigonometria Piana (in Italian).
- Pagnini, Giovanni (1728). Trionfo in Mare ossia Scuola di CommandareArmate e Vascelli da Guerra, cosi per la manovra come per Caccia e Combattere il Nemico (in Italian).
- Pagnini, Giovanni. Dell'Estrazione delle radici quadrati e cube (in Italian).
- Pagnini, Giovanni (1750). Trattato della sfera, ed introduzione alla navigazione per uso de' piloti (in Italian). Venice: Giovanni Battista Recurti.
- Pagnini, Giovanni (1753). Costruzione ed uso del compasso di proporzione (in Italian). Naples: Ignazio Russo.

== See also ==
- Sector (instrument)
