= Millennium Bible =

20th-century Catholic translation of the Bible into Polish

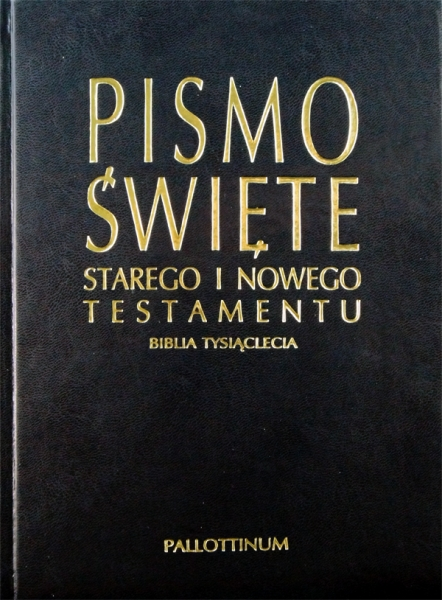
- Full name: Pismo Święte: Starego i Nowego Testamentu, Biblia Tysiąclecia
- Language: Polish
- Complete Bible published: 1st Edition: 1965 2nd Edition: 1971; 3rd Edition: 1980; 4th Edition: 1983 5th Edition: 1999
- Apocrypha: yes
- Religious affiliation: Catholicism
- Website: biblia.pl
- Genesis 1:1–3 Na początku Bóg stworzył niebo i ziemię. Ziemia zaś była bezładem i pustkowiem: ciemność była nad powierzchnią bezmiaru wód, a Duch Boży unosił się nad wodami. Wtedy Bóg rzekł: «Niechaj się stanie światłość!» I stała się światłość. John 3:16 Tak bowiem Bóg umiłował świat, że Syna swego Jednorodzonego dał, aby każdy, kto w Niego wierzy, nie zginął, ale miał życie wieczne.

The Millennium Bible (Polish: Biblia Tysiąclecia; full title: Pismo Święte: Starego i Nowego Testamentu, Biblia Tysiąclecia, English: The Sacred Scripture: of Old and New Testament, the Millennium Bible) is the main Polish Bible translation used in the liturgy of the Roman Catholic Church in Poland. This Bible has been officially approved by the Polish Episcopal Conference. Its first edition was published in 1965 for the 1000-year anniversary of the baptism of Poland in 966.

== Contents (5th Edition) ==
Each book is preceded by an introduction to it.

* – Deuterocanonical

| No. | English | Polish |
|---|---|---|
| | Foreword by Cardinal Stefan Wyszyński, Primate of Poland | Słowo Wstępne Kard. Stefana Wyszyńskiego, Prymasa Polski |
| | Introductory Remarks of the Editorial Board to the First Edition | Uwagi Wstępne Kolegium Redakcyjnego do Pierwszego Wydania |
| | First Edition Contributors | Współpracownicy Pierwszego Wydania |
| | Foreword by the Scientific Editorial Staff to the Second Edition | Słowo Wstępne Redakcji Naukowej do Drugiego Wydania |
| | Foreword by the Scientific Editorial Staff to the Third Edition | Słowo Wstępne Redakcji Naukowej do Trzeciego Wydania |
| | Foreword by the Scientific Editorial Staff to the Fifth Edition | Słowo Wstępne Redakcji Naukowej do Piątego Wydania |
| | List of Abbreviations | Wykaz Skrótów |
| | Books and Their Translators | Księgi i Ich Tłumacze |
| | OLD TESTAMENT | STARY TESTAMENT |
| | Introduction to Pentateuch | Wstęp do Pięcioksięgu |
| 1 | Book of Genesis | Księga Rodzaju |
| 2 | Book of Exodus | Księga Wyjścia |
| 3 | Book of Leviticus | Księga Kapłańska |
| 4 | Book of Numbers | Księga Liczb |
| 5 | Book of Deuteronomy | Księga Powtórzonego Prawa |
| 6 | Book of Joshua | Księga Jozuego |
| 7 | Book of Judges | Księga Sędziów |
| 8 | Book of Ruth | Księga Rut |
| 9 | First Book of Samuel | Pierwsza Księga Samuela |
| 10 | Second Book of Samuel | Druga Księga Samuela |
| 11 | First Book of Kings | Pierwsza Księga Królewska |
| 12 | Second Book of Kings | Druga Księga Królewska |
| 13 | First Book of Chronicles | Pierwsza Księga Kronik |
| 14 | Second Book of Chronicles | Druga Księga Kronik |
| 15 | Book of Ezra | Księga Ezdrasza |
| 16 | Book of Nehemiah | Księga Nehemiasza |
| 17 | Book of Tobit* | Księga Tobiasza* |
| 18 | Book of Judith* | Księga Judyty* |
| 19 | Book of Esther – Prologue: Dream and Conspiracy (1:1a-1r)* – The Copy of the Decree Against the Jews (3:13a-13g)* – The Extension to the Dialogue Between Hathach and Mordecai (4:9-17)* – Prayers of Mordecai and Esther for God's Intervention (4:17a-17z)* – Expansion of the Scene in which Esther appears before the king (5:1a-2b)* – The Copy of the Decree In Favor of the Jews (8:12a-12x)* – Explanation of the Dream from the Prologue (10:3a-3k)* – Colophon (10:3l)* | Księga Estery – Prolog: Sen i Spisek (1:1a-1r)* – Odpis Dekretu o Zagładzie Żydów (3:13a-13g)* – Przedłużenie Dialogu między Hatakiem a Mardocheuszem (4:9-17)* – Modlitwy Estery i Mardocheusza o Interwencję Bożą (4:17a-17z)* – Rozwinięcie Sceny, w której Estera pojawia się przed królem (5:1a-2b)* – Odpis Dekretu Rehabilitujący Żydów (8:12a-12x)* – Wyjaśnienie Snu Wstępnego (10:3a-3k)* – Notatka o Przekładzie (10:3l)* |
| 20 | First Book of Maccabees* | Pierwsza Księga Machabejska* |
| 21 | Second Book of Maccabees* | Druga Księga Machabejska* |
| | Introduction to Poetic Books | Wstęp do Ksiąg Dydaktycznych |
| 22 | Book of Job | Księga Hioba |
| 23 | Book of Psalms | Księga Psalmów |
| 24 | Book of Proverbs | Księga Przysłów |
| 25 | Ecclesiastes | Księga Koheleta [Eklezjastesa] |
| 26 | Song of Songs | Pieśń nad Pieśniami |
| 27 | Book of Wisdom* | Księga Mądrości* |
| 28 | Book of Sirach* | Mądrość Syracha [Eklezjastyk]* |
| | Introduction to Prophetic Books | Wstęp do Ksiąg Prorockich |
| 29 | Book of Isaiah | Księga Izajasza |
| 30 | Book of Jeremiah | Księga Jeremiasza |
| 31 | Book of Lamentations | Lamentacje |
| 32 | Book of Baruch* – Letter of Jeremiah (Chapter 6)* | Księga Barucha* – List Jeremiasza (Rozdział 6)* |
| 33 | Book of Ezekiel | Księga Ezechiela |
| 34 | Book of Daniel – Prayer of Azariah (3:25-50)* – Song of the Three Holy Children (3:51-90)* – Susanna (Chapter 13)* – Bel and the Dragon (Chapter 14)* | Księga Daniela – Pieśń Azariasza (3:25-50)* – Pieśń Trzech Młodzieńców (3:51-90)* – Opowieść o Zuzannie i Starcach (Rozdział 13)* – Bel i Wąż (Rozdział 14)* |
| | Introduction to Minor Prophets | Wstęp do Proroków Mniejszych |
| 35 | Book of Hosea | Księga Ozeasza |
| 36 | Book of Joel | Księga Joela |
| 37 | Book of Amos | Księga Amosa |
| 38 | Book of Obadiah | Księga Abdiasza |
| 39 | Book of Jonah | Księga Jonasza |
| 40 | Book of Micah | Księga Micheasza |
| 41 | Book of Nahum | Księga Nahuma |
| 42 | Book of Habakkuk | Księga Habakuka |
| 43 | Book of Zephaniah | Księga Sofoniasza |
| 44 | Book of Haggai | Księga Aggeusza |
| 45 | Book of Zechariah | Księga Zachariasz |
| 46 | Book of Malachi | Księga Malachiasza |
| | NEW TESTAMENT | NOWY TESTAMENT |
| | General Introduction to the Gospels | Wstęp Ogólny do Ewangelii |
| 47 | Gospel of Matthew | Ewangelia według św. Mateusza |
| 48 | Gospel of Mark | Ewangelia według św. Marka |
| 49 | Gospel of Luke | Ewangelia według św. Łukasza |
| 50 | Gospel of John | Ewangelia według św. Jana |
| 51 | Acts of the Apostles | Dzieje Apostolskie |
| | Life and Activity of Saint Paul | Życie i Działalność św. Pawła |
| 52 | Epistle to the Romans | List do Rzymian |
| 53 | First Epistle to the Corinthians | Pierwszy List do Koryntian |
| 54 | Second Epistle to the Corinthians | Drugi List do Koryntian |
| 55 | Epistle to the Galatians | List do Galatów |
| 56 | Epistle to the Ephesians | List do Efezjan |
| 57 | Epistle to the Philippians | List do Filipian |
| 58 | Epistle to the Colossians | List do Kolosan |
| 59 | First Epistle to the Thessalonians | Pierwszy List do Tesaloniczan |
| 60 | Second Epistle to the Thessalonians | Drugi List do Tesaloniczan |
| 61 | First Epistle to Timothy | Pierwszy List do Tymoteusza |
| 62 | Second Epistle to Timothy | Drugi List do Tymoteusza |
| 63 | Epistle to Titus | List do Tytusa |
| 64 | Epistle to Philemon | List do Filemona |
| 65 | Epistle to the Hebrews | List do Hebrajczyków |
| 66 | Epistle of James | List św. Jakuba Apostoła |
| 67 | First Epistle of Peter | Pierwszy List św. Piotra Apostoła |
| 68 | Second Epistle of Peter | Drugi List św. Piotra Apostoła |
| 69 | First Epistle of John | Pierwszy List św. Jana Apostoła |
| 70 | Second Epistle of John | Drugi List św. Jana Apostoła |
| 71 | Third Epistle of John | Trzeci List św. Jana Apostoła |
| 72 | Epistle of Jude | List św. Judy |
| 73 | Book of Revelation | Apokalipsa św. Jana |
| | ADDITIONS | DODATKI |
| | A dictionary of some biblical terms, proper names and geographical names marked with the ^{S} in the text | Słownik niektórych pojęć biblijnych, imion własnych i nazw geograficznych, opatrzonych w tekście znakiem^{S} |
| | Chronological Table | Tablica Chronologiczna |
