= Horváth =

Horváth is a common Hungarian surname. "Horváth" is the 2nd or 4th most common surname in Hungary as well as the most common in Slovakia. It's thought to derive from Hungarian horvát ("Croat") spelled without the final h in old orthography. The related Croatian surname Horvat, which is derived from an older version of the noun "Hrvat" ("Croat"), is the most common surname in Croatia or the Croatian diaspora. Members of this family can be found across the world, and are most numerous in the United States. Variations of the name include Horvat, Horvaty, Hrvat, Chorbadi, Orbath, Orvath, Orvat. The spelling of Horváth is of exclusive Hungarian origin.

== People named Horváth or Horwath ==
- Aaron Horvath (born 1980), American animator
- Ádám Horváth (born 1981), Hungarian chess grandmaster
- Adrián Horváth (born 1987), Hungarian footballer
- Adrian Pavel Horvat (born 1990), Romanian footballer
- Adrienne Horvath (1925–2012), French politician
- Alexander Horváth (1938–2022), Slovak footballer
- András Horváth (disambiguation)
- Andrea Horwath (born 1962), Canadian politician in Ontario
- Antonio Horvath (1950–2018), Chilean senator of Hungarian ancestry
- Attila Horváth (disambiguation)
- Blake Horvath (born 2004), American football player
- Bronco Horvath (1930–2019), Canadian hockey player
- Csaba Horváth (disambiguation)
- Dániel Horváth (born 1996), Hungarian footballer
- Deana Horváthová (born 1958), Slovak actress and film producer
- Dezsö J. Horváth, Canadian businessman and educator
- Eva Horváthová (born 1974), Slovak physician and politician
- Ethan Horvath (born 1995), American soccer player
- Ferenc Horváth (born 1973), Hungarian footballer
- Gábor Horváth (disambiguation)
- Gergely Horváth (born 1975), Hungarian javelin thrower
- Géza Horváth (1847–1937), Hungarian entomologist
- Gyula Horváth (born 1975), Hungarian footballer
- Joan Horvath, American astronomer, aeronautic scientist, writer, and entrepreneur
- Johann Horvath (1903–1968), Austrian footballer
- Johann Baptiste Horvath (1732–1799), Hungarian academic and university professor
- József Horváth (disambiguation)
- Josef Maria Horváth (1931–2019), Austrian-Hungarian composer
- Karoly Horvath, Hungarian-American pediatric gastroenterologist
- Károly Horváth (1950–2015), Romanian-born Hungarian musician
- László Horváth (disambiguation)
- Laura Horvath (born 1997), Hungarian CrossFit athlete
- Les Horvath (1921–1995), American football player
- Lotti Horváth (born 2009), Hungarian fencer
- Michal Horváth (disambiguation)
- Mihály Horváth (1809–1878), Hungarian bishop, historian, and politician.
- Nick Horvath (born 1981), American-New Zealand basketball player
- Ödön von Horváth (1901–1938) German-writing Austro-Hungarian-born playwright and novelist
- Olivér Horváth (born 2000), Hungarian footballer
- Opika von Méray Horváth (1889–1977), Hungarian figure skater
- Pavel Horváth (born 1975), Czech footballer
- Péter Horváth (disambiguation)
- Polly Horvath (born 1957), American-Canadian author
- Rudolf Horvat (1873–1947), Croatian historian
- Rudolf Horváth (born 1947), Slovak handball player
- Ryan Horvath (born 1983), American football player
- Sascha Horvath (born 1996), Austrian footballer
- Sharon Horvath (born 1958), American mixed media artist, painter, educator
- Steve Horvath (born 1967), American aging researcher and inventor of the Horvath clock
- Tamás Horváth (disambiguation)
- Vlastimil Horváth (born 1977), Romani singer
- William Horvath (born 1938), American politician and conservationist
- Zander Horvath (born 1998), American football player
- Zoltán Horváth (disambiguation)

== Fictional characters ==
- Cora Orvat, a super-agent from the Cora Orvat series of ironic science fiction crime/mystery novels by Kir Bulychev
- Detective Carl Horvath character in the TV series Queer as Folk
- Dale Horvath in The Walking Dead
- Hannah Horvath, character in the TV series Girls
- Technical Sergeant Mike Horvath in Saving Private Ryan, portrayed by Tom Sizemore
- Dr. Anthony Horvath, a Galactic scientist in The Mote in God's Eye
- Villain in the movie The Sorcerers Apprentice portrayed by Alfred Molina
- Horvath Blayne, appearing in August Derleth's short fiction story The Black Island

== See also ==
- Horvát (Horvat)
- Hrovat (Chrovat)
