= Names of the Croats and Croatia =

The non-native name of Croatia (Croatian: Hrvatska) derives from Medieval Latin Croātia, itself a derivation of the native ethnonym of Croats, earlier *Xъrvate and modern-day Croatian: Hrvati. The earliest preserved mentions of the ethnonym in stone inscriptions and written documents in the territory of Croatia are dated to the 8th-9th century, but its existence is considered to be of an earlier date due to lack of preserved historical evidence as the arrival of the Croats is historically and archaeologically dated to the 6th-7th century. The names of the Croats, Croatia and Croatian language with many derivative toponyms, anthroponyms and synonyms became widespread all over Europe.

There exist many and various linguistical and historical theories on the origin of the ethnonym. It is usually considered not to be of Slavic but rather Iranian language origin. According to the most probable Iranian theory, the Proto-Slavic *Xъrvat- < *Xurwāt- derives from Proto-Ossetian / Alanian *xurvæt- or *xurvāt-, in the meaning of "one who guards" ("guardian, protector"), which was borrowed before the 7th century. The relation to the 3rd-century Scytho-Sarmatian form Khoroáthos (alternate forms comprise Khoróatos and Khoroúathos) attested in the Tanais Tablets, near the border of present-day Ukraine and European Russia, although possible remains uncertain.

== Earliest record ==
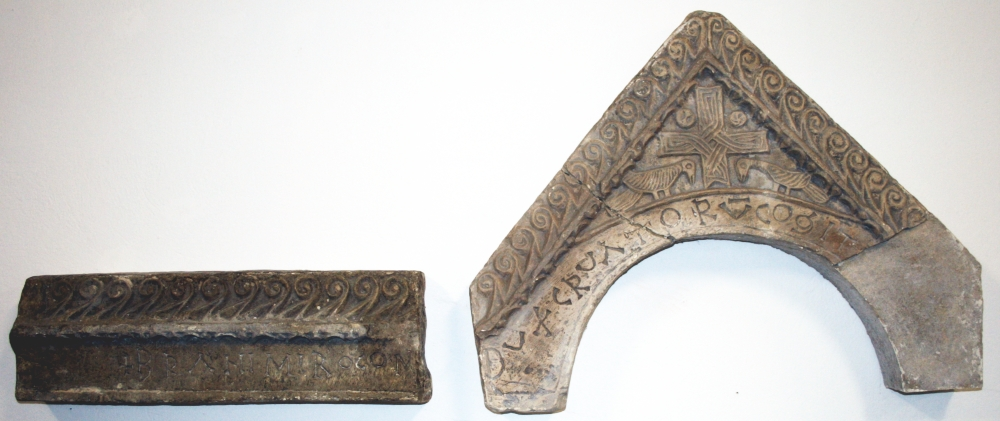
The Branimir Inscription, c. 879–892

In 2005, it was archaeologically confirmed that the ethnonym Croatorum (half-preserved) is mentioned for the first time in a church inscription found in Bijaći near Trogir dated to the end of the 8th or early 9th century.

The oldest known preserved stone inscription with full ethnonym "Cruatorum" is the 9th-century Branimir inscription found in Šopot near Benkovac, in reference to Duke Branimir, dated between 879 and 892, during his rule. The inscription mentions:

BRANIMIRO COM [...] DUX CRVATORVM COGIT [...]

The Latin charter of Duke Trpimir, dated to 852, has been generally considered the first attestation of the ethnonym "Chroatorum". However, the original of this document has been lost, and copy has been preserved in a 1568 transcript. Lujo Margetić proposed in 2002 that the document is in fact of legislative character, dating to 840.

In the Trpimir charter, it is mentioned:

Dux Chroatorum iuvatus munere divino [...] Regnum Chroatorum

The monument with the earliest writing in Croatian containing the native ethnonym variation xъrvatъ ([xŭrvaːtŭ]) is the Baška tablet from 1100, which reads: zvъnъmirъ kralъ xrъvatъskъ ("Zvonimir, king of Croats").

== Etymology ==
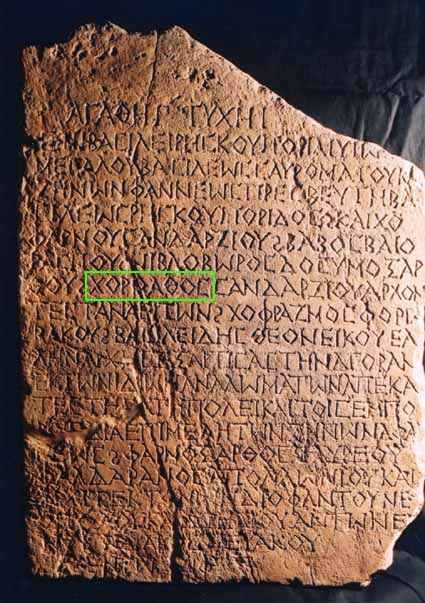
The Tanais Tablet B containing the word Χοροάθος (Khoroáthos).

The exact origin and meaning of the ethnonym Hr̀vāt (Proto-Slavic *Xъrvátъ, or *Xurwātu) is still subject to scientific disagreement. The first etymological thesis about the name of the Croats stems from Constantine Porphyrogennetos (tenth century), who connected the different names of the Croats, Βελοχρωβάτοι and Χρωβάτοι (Belokhrobatoi and Khrobatoi), with the Greek word χώρα (khṓra, "land"): "Croats in Slavic language means those who have many lands". In the 13th century, Thomas the Archdeacon considered that it was connected with the name of inhabitants of the Krk isle, which he gave as Curetes, Curibantes. In the 17th century, Juraj Ratkaj found a reflexion of the verb hrvati (se) "to wrestle" in the name. A more contemporary theory believes that it might not be of native Slavic lexical stock, but a borrowing from an Iranian language. Common theories from the 20th and 21st centuries derive it from an Iranian origin, the root word being a third-century Scytho-Sarmatian form attested in the Tanais Tablets as Χοροάθος (Khoroáthos, alternate forms comprise Khoróatos and Khoroúathos).

In the 19th century, many different derivations were proposed for the Croatian ethnonym:

- Josef Dobrovský believed it to be linked to the root *hrev "tree", whereas Johann Kaspar Zeuss linked it to *haru "sword";
- Sylwiusz Mikucki connected it with Old-Indian šarv- "strike";
- Pavel Jozef Šafárik derived it from xrъbъtъ, xribъtъ, xribъ "ridge, highlanders", whereas Franz Miklosich said it derived from hrъv (hrŭv) "dance";
- Đuro Daničić considered its root to be *sar- "guard, protect";
- Fyodor Braun saw the German Harfada (Harvaða fjöllum from Hervarar saga ok Heiðreks), which would be the German name of the Carpathian Mountains, as the origin of an intermediate form Harvata;
- Rudolf Much connected it to a Proto-Germanic word hruvat- "horned", or – as Z. Gołąb later proposed common noun *xъrvъ//*xorvъ "armor" as a prehistorical loanword from Germanic *hurwa-//*harwa- "horn-armor"; derivatives *xъrvati sę//*xъrviti sę "get armored, defend oneself" – "warriors clad with horn-armor", as a self-designation or exonym;
- Henry Hoyle Howorth, J. B. Bury, Henri Grégoire, considered that it derives from the personal name of Kubrat, the leader of the Bulgars and founder of Old Great Bulgaria. This etymology is considered as improbable.

The 20th century gave rise to many new theories regarding the origin of the name of the Croats:

- A. I. Sobolevski derived it from the Iranian words hu- "good", ravah- "space, freedom" and suffix -at-;
- Grigoriĭ Andreevich Ilʹinskiĭ derived it from *kher- "cut", as seen in the Greek word kárkharos "sharp", kharah "tough, sharp", and xorbrъ "brave";
- Hermann Hirt saw a connection with the name of a Germanic tribe Harudes (Χαροῦδες);
- Leopold Geitler, Josef Perwolf, Aleksander Brückner, Tadeusz Lehr-Spławiński and Heinz Schuster-Šewc linked the root hrv- to Slovak charviti sa "to oppose, defend" or via skъrv-/xъrv- to the Lithuanian šárvas "armor" and šarvúotas "armed, cuirassier", with suffix -at emphasizing the characteristic, giving the meaning of a "well armed man, soldier";
- Karel Oštir considered valid a connection with an unspecified Thraco-Illyrian word xъrvata- "hill";
- Max Vasmer first considered it as a loanword from Old-Iranian, *(fšu-)haurvatā- "shepherd, cattle guardian" (formed of Avestan pasu- "cattle" and verb haurvaiti "guard"), later also from Old-Iranian hu-urvatha- "friend" (also accepted by N. Zupanič).
- Niko Zupanič additionally proposed Lezgian origin from Xhurava (community) and plural suffix -th, meaning "municipalities, communities".
- M. Budimir saw in the name a reflexion of Indo-European *skwos "gray, grayish", which in Lithuanian gives širvas;
- S. K. Sakač linked it with the Avestan name Harahvaitī, which once signified the southwestern part of modern Afghanistan, the province Arachosia. "Arachosia" is the Latinized form of Ancient Greek Ἀραχωσία (Arachosíā), in Old Persian inscriptions, the region is referred to as Harahuvatiš. In Indo-Iranian it actually means "one that pours into ponds", which derives from the name of the Sarasvati River of Rigveda. However, although the somewhat suggestive similarity, the connection to the name of Arachosia is etymologically incorrect;
- G. Vernadsky considered a connection to the Chorasmí from Khwarezm, while F. Dvornik a link to the Krevatades or Krevatas located in the Caucasus mentioned in the De Ceremoniis (tenth century).
- V. Miller saw in the Croatian name the Iranian hvar- "sun" and va- "bed", P. Tedesco had a similar interpretation from Iranian huravant "sunny", while others from the Slavic god Khors;
- Otto Kronsteiner suggested it might be derived from Tatar-Bashkir *chr "free" and *vata "to fight, to wage war";
- Stanisław Rospond derived it from Proto-Slavic *chorb- + suffix -rъ in the meaning of "brave";
- Oleg Trubachyov derived it from *xar-va(n)t (feminine, rich in women, ruled by women), which derived from the etymology of Sarmatians name, the Indo-Aryan *sar-ma(n)t "feminine", in both Indo-Iranian adjective suffix -ma(n)t/wa(n)t, and Indo-Aryan and the Indo-Iranian *sar- "woman", which in Iranian gives *har-.

Among them most taken into account were (1) the Germanic derivation from the Carpathian Mountains which is by now considered as obsolete; (2) the Slavic and Germanic derivations about "well armed man"/"warriors clad with horn-armor" indicating that they stood out from the other Slavs in terms of weapons and armour, but it is not convincing because no other Slavic tribe is named after the objects of material culture. Etymologically the first was a Lithuanian borrowing from much younger Middle High German sarwes, while the second with hypothetical *hurwa-//*harwa- argues a borrowing from Proto-Germanic dialect of the Bastarnae in the sub-Carpathian or Eastern Carpathian region which isn't preserved in any Slavic or Germanic language; (3) and the prevailing Iranian derivations, Vasmer's *(fšu-)haurvatā- ("cattle guardian") and Trubachyov's *xar-va(n)t (feminine, rich in women, ruled by women).

While linguists and historians agreed with Vasmer's or Trubachyov's derivation, according to Tadeusz Lehr-Spławiński and Radoslav Katičić, the Iranian theses doesn't entirely fit with the Croatian ethnonym, as according to them, the original plural form was Hrъvate not Hъrvate, and the vowel "a" in the Iranian harvat- is short, while in the Slavic Hrъvate it is long among others. Katičić concluded that of all the etymological considerations, the Iranian is the least unlikely. Ranko Matasović also considered it of Iranian origin, but besides confirming original forms as *Xъrvátъ (sl.) and *Xъrvate (pl.), dismissed Trubachyov's derivation because was semantically and historically completely unfounded, and concluded that the only derivation which met the criteria of adaptation of Iranian language forms to Proto-Slavic, as well as historical and semantical plausibility, it is the Vasmer's assumption but with some changes, as the Proto-Slavic *Xъrvat- < *Xurwāt- comes from Proto-Ossetian / Alanian *xurvæt- or *xurvāt-, in the meaning of "one who guards" ("guardian, protector"), which was borrowed before the 7th century, and possibly was preserved as a noun in Old Polish charwat (guard).

The relation of the Croatian ethnonym to the 3rd-century personal name Khoroáthos from Tanais Tablets, Katičić considered that "to identify this personal name as an indirect trace of the name for the Croats is a serious and fundamentally convincing thesis. No more and no less than that, but there is, however, no total certainty in that thesis either", while Matasović considered to be "coincidental similarities". The Medieval Latin C(h)roatae and Greek form Khrōbátoi are adaptations of Western South Slavic plural pronunciation *Xərwate from the late 8th and early 9th century, and came to Greek via a Frankish source. To the Proto-Slavic singular form are closest Old Russian xorvaty (*xъrvaty) and German-Lusatian Curuuadi from 11th and 12th century sources, while the old plural form *Xъrvate is correctly reflected in Old Russian Xrovate, Xrvate, Church Slavonic xarьvate and Old Croatian Hrvate. The form Charvát in Old Czech came from Croatian-Chakavian or Old Polish (Charwaty). The Croatian ethnonym Hr̀vāt (sl.) and Hrváti (pl.) in the Kajkavian dialect also appear in the form Horvat and Horvati, while in the Chakavian dialect in the form Harvat and Harvati.

== Distribution ==
Croatian place names can be found in northern Slavic regions such as Moravia (Czech Republic) and Slovakia, Poland, along the river Saale in Germany, in Austria and Slovenia, and in the south in Greece, Albania among others.

In Germany along Saale river there were Chruuati near Halle in 901 AD, Chruuati in 981 AD, Chruazis in 1012 AD, Churbate in 1055 AD, Grawat in 1086 AD, Curewate (now Korbetha), Großkorbetha (Curuvadi and Curuuuati 881-899 AD) and Kleinkorbetha, and Korbetha west of Leipzig; In Moravia are Charwath, or Charvaty near Olomouc, in Slovakia are Chorvaty and Chrovátice near Varadka. The Charwatynia near Kashubians in district Wejherowo, and Сhаrwаtу or Klwaty near Radom in Poland among others.

Thus in the Duchy of Carinthia one can find pagus Crouuati (954), Crauuati (961), Chrouuat (979) and Croudi (993) along upper Mura; in Middle Ages the following place names have been recorded: Krobathen, Krottendorf, Krautkogel; Kraut (before Chrowat and Croat) near Spittal. In the Duchy of Styria there are toponyms such as Chraberstorf and Krawerspach near Murau, Chrawat near Laas in Judendorf, Chrowat, Kchrawathof and Krawabten near Leoben. Along middle Mura Krawerseck, Krowot near Weiz, Krobothen near Stainz and Krobathen near Straganz. In Slovenia there are also Hrovate, Hrovača, and Hrvatini.

In the Southeastern Balkans, oeconyms Rvatska Stubica, Rvaši, Rvat(i) in Montenegro; several villages Hrvati and Gornji/Donji Hrvati in Bosnia and Herzegovina including Horvaćani (Hrvaćani Hristjanski) and Hrvatovići; Rvatsko Selo, Hrvatska, and hamlet Hrvatske Mohve in Serbia; North Macedonia has a place named Arvati (Арвати) situated near lower Prespa; in Greece there is a Charváti or Kharbáti (Χαρβάτι) in Attica and Harvation or Kharbátion in Argolis, as well as Charváta (Χαρβάτα) on Crete; and Hirvati in Albania, among others in other countries.

=== Anthroponyms ===
The ethnonym also inspired many anthroponyms which can be found in Eastern and Southeastern Europe. They are recorded at least since the 11th century in Croatia in the form of a personal name Hrvatin. Since the 14th century they can be found in the area of the Croatian capital city of Zagreb, in Bosnia and Herzegovina (especially in the area of East Herzegovina), as well as in the Dečani chrysobulls of Serbia, and since the 15th century in Montenegro, Kosovo, and North Macedonia. In Poland the surnames Karwat, Carwad, Charwat, Carwath, Horwat, Horwath, Horwatowie are recorded since the 14th century in Kraków, Przemyśl and elsewhere, generally among the native Polish nobility, peasants, and local residents, but not among foreigners. They used it as a nickname, probably due to the influence of immigration from the Kingdom of Hungary. Since the 16th century surname Harvat is recorded in Romania.

It is mentioned in the form of the surnames Horvat, Horvatin, Hrvatin, Hrvatinić, Hrvatić, Hrvatović, Hrvet, Hervatić, H(e)rvatinčić, H(e)rvojević, Horvatinić, Horvačević, Horvatinović, Hrvović, Hrvoj, Rvat, and Rvatović. Today Horvat is the most numerous surname in Croatia, and the second most numerous in Slovenia (where the forms Hrovat, Hrovatin, and Hrvatin also exist), while Horváth is the most numerous surname in Slovakia and one of the most numerous in Hungary. In the Czech Republic, variation Charvat is found.

The male personal names Hrvoje, Hrvoj, Hrvoja, Horvoja, Hrvojhna, Hrvatin, Hrvajin, Hrvo, Hrvojin, Hrvojica, Hrvonja, Hrvat, Hrvad, Hrvadin, Hrviša, Hrvoslav, and Rvoje are derived from the ethnonym, as are the female names Hrvatica, Hrvojka, Hrvatina, and Hrvoja. Today the given name Hrvoje is one of the most common in Croatia.

== Synonyms ==
Throughout history, many synonyms were used for the Croats, their country and language, see the list below. In other cases, the Croatian ethnonym was also used in the sense of the "Illyrian costume" meant "pohârvātjen" in lexicon by Joakim Stulić (1810), and the "Hungarian or Croatian costume" (alla croata), the Cavalleria Croata in the Venetian Dalmatia, the lingua croatica for the Glagolitic script (so-called St. Jerome's script) and in general for the Illyrian language (and foundation of the San Girolamo dei Croati and related Pontifical Croatian College of St. Jerome in Rome).

Croat(s) (Harvat, Horvat, Hervat, Croata and other variations)

- Dalmatinci (Dalmatians) - lexicon by Faust Vrančić (1595, 1605), lexicon by Albert Szenczi Molnár (1604) the "Horvat" means "Croata, Dalmata, Illyricus", lexicon by Andrija Jambrešić (1742).
- Slovinci, Slovinjani (Slavs) - at least since the time of Croatian duke Domagoj (Sclavorum duce, mid-9th century), lexicon by Joakim Stulić (1806).
- Iliri (Illyrians) - work by Laonikos Chalkokondyles (mid-15th century), lexicon by Albert Szenczi Molnár (1604), lexicon by Jakov Mikalja (1649), lexicon by Ivan Belostenec (17th century, publ. 1740), lexicon by Andrija Jambrešić (1742), lexicon by Joakim Stulić (1806, 1810).
- Liburni (Liburnians) - lexicon by Joakim Stulić (1806).
- Vlachs (ethnic, social class), Morlachs and Ćići - became umbrella exonyms used by Venetians, Austrians and Ottomans for a social class, immigrants, and hinterland population of South Slavs in Dalmatia, Lika and Istria nevertheless of their actual ethnic origin and identity, including for Croats. From it emerged sub-ethnic identity of Vlahi in Istria.
- Uskoks and Hajduks - people who were usually active as irregular soldiers in Dalmatia, Senj and Slavonia.
- Bunjevci - a sub-ethnic group of Croats in Dalmatia, Lika and Bačka.
- Šokci - a sub-ethnic group of Croats in Slavonia, Srijem, Baranja and Bačka. Bartol Kašić in 1613 recorded that they speak "lingua croata".
- Predavci - sub-ethnic identity of Catholic Croats and Bosnians in the 17th century continental part of Croatia (Slavonian Military Frontier and Varaždin Generalate), probably coming from Ottoman Bosnia Eyalet, and the term meaning refugees who surrendered to someone (verb "predati"). In 1635 they were mentioned as "Bosnenis Croatae ex Turicia sponti venientes qui vulgo Praedavcis vocaventur", 1640 as "Catholici quoque Bosnenses Praedavci", in 1641 "Bosnenses catholici vulgo Praedavczy", 1651 as "catholici Bosnenses siue Praedauty", and 1662 as "Praedavcy, hoc est hominis Catholici Sclavonicae aut Croatiae nationis".
- Bošnjani - ethnic identity of the people of medieval Bosnia (Christian and Muslim), for whom in the late 16th century Ottoman historian Gelibolulu Mustafa Ali wrote to be a territorial term while the people living there belong to the "Croatian nation" and are "tribe of Croats".
- Tótok - in lexicon by Albert Szenczi Molnár (1604) a "Tót" means "Sclavus, Dalmata, Illyricus", a "Totorszag" (Tótsag) is "Dalmatia, Sclavonia, Illyrica, Illyricum" and "Totorszagi" language is "Dalmaticus".
- Raci - umbrella exonym used between 15th and 18th century by the Hungarians for South Slavs who immigrated to the Southern Pannonian Plain (in Hungary), besides mostly Serbian Orthodox population, included Catholics (Croats); in lexicon's of Molnar, Mikalja and Stulli the terms Rascians/Serbs and Rascia/Serbia were not recorded as narrow synonyms for Slavs/Dalmatians/Illyrians and Slavonia/Dalmatia/Illyria, but in broader context sometimes were identified as well in foreign documents.
- Bezjaci, Bazgoni and Fućki - sub-ethnic identity in continental part of Croatia, and Istria, who speak Kajkavian dialect in Croatia, and Northern Chakavian and Buzet dialect in Istria.
- Fućki - sub-ethnic identity in Istria.
- Kraljevci - sub-ethnic identity in Istria.
- Benečani - sub-ethnic identity in Istria.
- Boduli - sub-ethnic identity for people of the island of Krk, also Northern and Central Adriatic islands in general, in comparison to the population on the mainland of Kvarner and Dalmatia.

Croatia (Horvat orsag, Hervatska, Hervatia, Croazia and other variations)

- S(c)lavonia - since the 12th century was a synonym of the Kingdom of Croatia and Dalmatia, hence the Hungarian title of the Duke of Slavonia, the Pope letters referring to Croatia as "Sclavonia" and so on.
- Dalmatia - at least since the time of Croatian duke Borna (early 9th century), lexicon by Fausto Veranzio (1595, 1605).
- Illyria (Illyricum) - lexicon by Albert Szenczi Molnár (1604), lexicon by Jakov Mikalja (1649).
- Liburnia - at least since the time of Croatian duke Borna (early 9th century), lexicon by Joakim Stulić (1806).
- Banadego - a 16th-century Venetian term for the Northern Dalmatian hinterland which once was part of the Kingdom of Croatia and governed by Ban of Croatia, but then part of Ottoman Dalmatia (Croatian vilayet which became part of the Sanjak of Klis).

Croatian language (harvatski/harva(s)cki, horvatski, hrovatski, hervatski/hervaski and other variations)

- Dalmatinski (Dalmatian) - lexicon by Fausto Veranzio (1595, 1605); lexicon by Jakov Mikalja (1649) the "Dalmaticus" with "Illyricus" and "Slovinski" is synonym for the same language, which itself would correspond with the Croatian name.
- Slovinski (Slavic) - poet Mavro Vetranović (1530s), lexicons by Pavao Ritter Vitezović (1700) and Ivan Tanzlingher Zanotti (1704) and Ardelio della Bella (1728), statement that there's "one language although in three names [ilirički, slovinjski, arvacki]" by Filip Grabovac (1747), lexicon by Joakim Stulić (1801, 1810).
- Ilirski (Illyrian) - by Teofil Kristek and Alfonso Carrillo in the late 16th century, grammar text by Lovro Šitović (1713), lexicons by Pavao Ritter Vitezović (1700) and Ivan Tanzlingher Zanotti (1704) and Ardelio della Bella (1728), lexicon by Andrija Jambrešić (1742), work Cvit razgovora naroda i jezika iliričkoga aliti arvackoga (1747) by Filip Grabovac, in the mid-18th century Venetian bilingual declarations the "Illirico" was usually translated as "H(a)rvatski" (less "Slovinski" and "Ilirički"), lexicon by Joakim Stulić (1801, 1810).
- Bosanski (Bosnian) - Primož Trubar (1557) stated that the Croatian language is spoken in all of Croatia and Dalmatia, and by many Muslims (Turks) in Bosnia and Herzegovina, as well court in Istanbul, and perceived dalmatinski and bosanski as idioms of a language spoken by Croats.

== Official name of Croatia ==
Throughout its history, there were many official political names of Croatia in the 20th century. When Croatia was part of the Kingdom of Yugoslavia, the entity was known as Banovina Hrvatska (Banovina of Croatia). After Yugoslavia was invaded in 1941, it became known as Nezavisna Država Hrvatska (Independent State of Croatia) as a puppet state of Nazi Germany and Fascist Italy. The present Croatian state became known as Federalna Država Hrvatska (Federal State of Croatia) when the country became part of the second Yugoslav state in 1944 following the third session of ZAVNOH. From 1945, the state became Narodna Republika Hrvatska (People's Republic of Croatia) and renamed again to Socijalistička Republika Hrvatska (Socialist Republic of Croatia) in 1963. After the constitution was adopted in December 1990, it was renamed to Republika Hrvatska (Republic of Croatia) and the name was retained when Croatia declared independence on June 25, 1991.

== See also ==
- White Croats
- White Croatia
- Origin hypotheses of the Croats
