= Charvát =

Charvát (feminine: Charvátová) is a Czech surname. It is derived from the Czech word Chorvat, meaning 'Croat'. Notable people with the surname include:

- Antonín Charvát (1899–1930), Czech cyclist
- Gregory Charvat, American scientist
- Josef Charvát (1897–1984), Czech medical doctor
- Lucie Charvátová (born 1993), Czech biathlete
- Olga Charvátová, (born 1962), Czech alpine skier
- Petr Charvát (1949–2023), Czech archaeologist and historian
- Přemysl Charvát (1930–2005), Czech conductor

== See also ==
- Horváth, a surname with the same meaning
- Horvat, a surname with the same meaning
