= Tanais Tablets =

Greek inscription

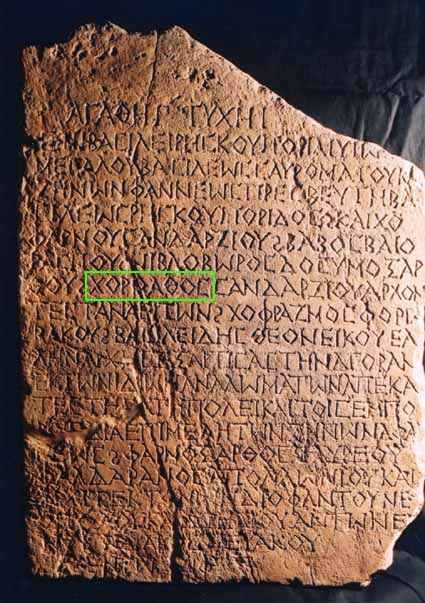
Photo of the Tanais Tablet B containing the name Χοροάθος (Horoáthos).

The Tanais Tablets are two tablets from the city of Tanais near modern Rostov-on-Don, Russia. They are written in Greek and are dated to the late 2nd–3rd century AD. At the time, Tanais had a mixed Greek, Gothic and Sarmatian population. The tablets are public inscriptions which commemorate renovation works in the city. One of the tablets, Tanais Tablet A, is damaged and not fully reconstructed. The other, Tanais Tablet B, is fully preserved and is dated to 220 AD.

The tablets were discovered by Russian archaeologist Pavel Leontiev in 1853. Today, they are kept in the lapidary of the Hermitage Museum in Saint Petersburg. The tablets are considered important for the early Croatian history and etymology of their ethnonym.

== Significance ==
Two male names are mentioned on the tablets: Horoúathos and Horóathos (Χορούαθ[ος], Χορόαθος). Tanais Tablet B mentions Horoathos as the son of (or from) Sandarz who was (or had been) the archon of the Tanaisians (one of theory Sandakšatru gens), which is a Scytho-Sarmatian name. These names have been interpreted by scholars as anthroponyms of the Croatian ethnonym Hrvat. The ethonym is generally considered to be of Iranian origin, and can be traced to the Tanais Tablets.

== Research history ==
The tablets were discovered by the Russian archaeologist Pavel Leontiev in September 1853. In 1902, A. L. Pogodin was the first scholar to connect the tablets' Iranian personal names with Croatian ethonyms, and as stated by Francis Dvornik (who also related them), "this theory was accepted by the German Slavist M. Wasmer, A. Sobolewski, the French linguists A. Meillet and A. Vaillant as well as by several south Slavonic philologists". Marija Gimbutas also considered them to be related.

Croatian scholars Stjepan Krizin Sakač, Dominik Mandić, and Radoslav Katičić have written significantly about the tablets. When Croatia was part of Yugoslavia, Yugoslav scholars avoided discussing them, or in the case of scholars such as Ferdo Šišić, Trpimir Macan, Josip Horvat, Bogo Grafenauer, Jaroslav Šidak, Gordan Ravančić, Ivan Biondić, and Stjepan Pantelić, discussed the tablets in a superficial way and misinterpreted their content. Croatian writer Miroslav Krleža saw the connection as "historical lunacy", while Nada Klaić used them in her criticism of the Iranian-Caucasian theory of the Croatian ethnogenesis. Open debate only followed after Croatian independence in 1991.

Today, scholars use these tablets only to explain the etymology, and not necessarily the origin and ethnogenesis of the Croats. Theories that early Croats were Slavs who had adopted a name of Iranian origin or were ruled by a Sarmatian elite caste, or that early Croats were Slavicized Sarmatians, cannot dismiss the remote Irano-Sarmatian elements or influence on the early Croatian ethnogenesis. Katičić considered that "to identify this personal name as an indirect trace of the name for the Croats is a serious and fundamentally convincing thesis", still, some like Danijel Džino consider that the secure connection of those three personal names with the Croatian ethnonym, or ethnic identity, is rather difficult without more evidence, Neven Budak that "there is no real evidence, in spite of the great similarity, that they are of the same linguistic origin", and Ranko Matasović as "coincidental similarities".

== Tanais Tablet A ==
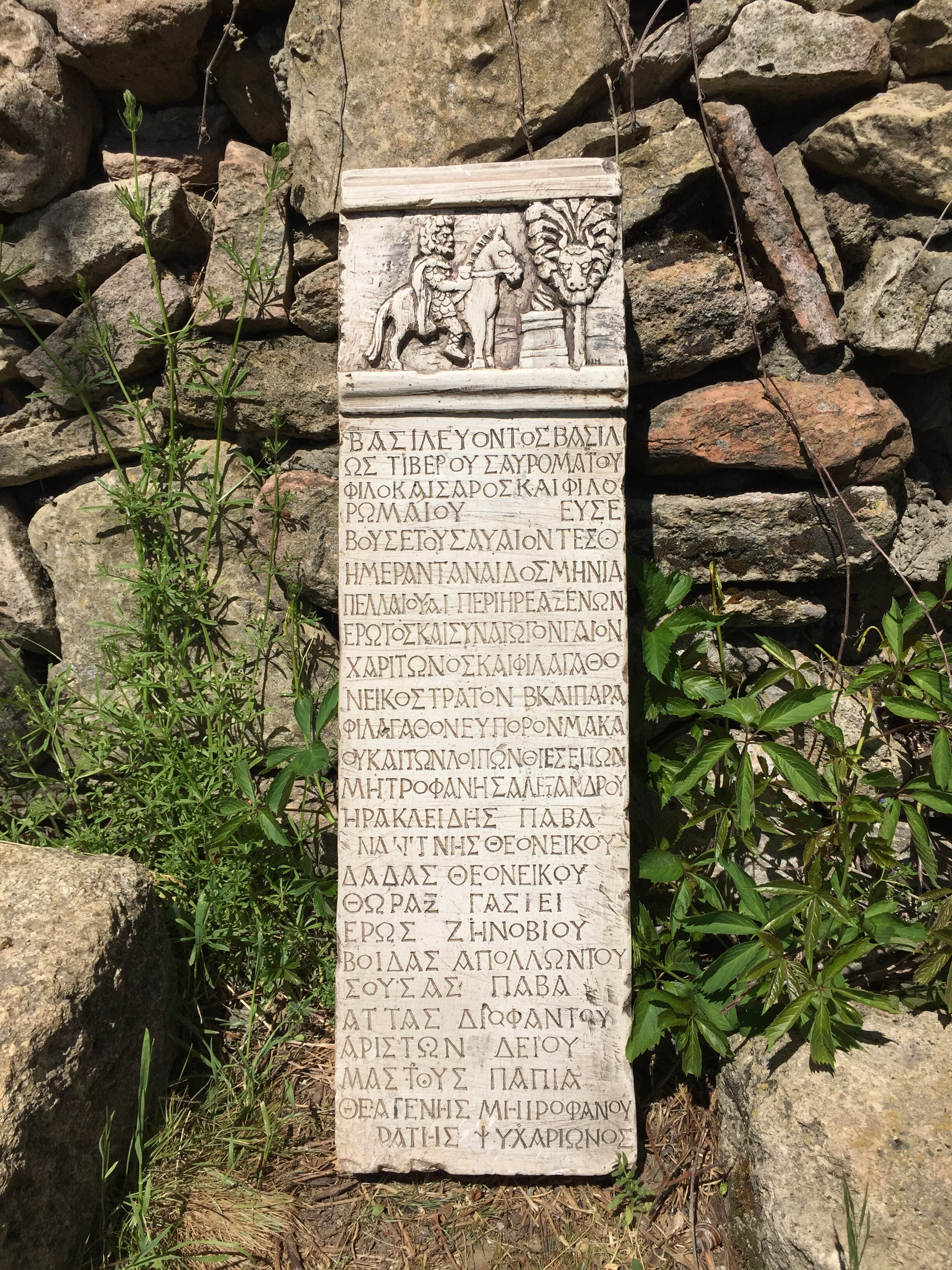
Tanais table A containing the names Χορούαθ[ος] and Χοροάθος (Horoúathos, Horoáthos).

Tablet A is the larger and older inscription, dated to 175–211 AD, and which originates from the time when the king Tiberius Julius Sauromates II (175–211 AD) ruled the Bosporan Kingdom. The marble tablet, measuring 0.92 m × 0.73 m × 0.09 m (36.2 in × 28.7 in × 3.5 in), probably sustained heavy damage even before the excavation. Thirty-two lines from thirty fragments were saved from the inscription. The public inscription mentions the king, the synod, or devotional assembly, the leadership of the devotional assembly, and its regular members, which were slightly less than forty. The fourth line ends by mentioning the father of the devotional assembly, Horoúathos (Χορούαθος), who is referred to by name in the fifth line, and amongst others, an unknown male who is said to be the son of Horoáthos (Χοροάθου) is also cited. The inscription ends with the date, from which is saved only the appellation of the Greek-Macedonian month, which corresponds to either July or August.

Greek original:

ΘΕΩι ΥΨΙΣΤΩι. ΆΓΑΘΗι ΤΥΧΗι.

ΒΑΣΙΛΕΥΟΝΤΟΣ ΒΑΣΙΛΕΩΣ ΤΙΒ(ΕΡΙΟΥ) ΙΟΥΛ(ΙΟΥ) ΣΑΥΡΟΜΑΤΟΥ
ΦΙΛΟΚΑΙΣΑΡ[ΟΣ ΚΑ]Ι ΦΙΛΟ[Ρ]ΩΜΑΙΟΥ, ΕΥΣΕΒΟΥΣ, Η ΣΥΝΟΔΟΣ
Η ΠΕΡΙ Ι[ΕΡΕΑ ΙΟΥ)ΛΙΟΝ ΡΑΛΧΑΔΟΥ ΚΑΙ ΠΑΤΕΡΑ Σ[Υ]ΝΟΔΟΥ
ΧΟΡΟΥΑΘ[ΟΝ]-----Ο — ΚΑΙ ΣΥΝΑΓΩΓΩΝ ΆΡΔΑ[ΡΑ] ΚΟΝ
[Σ]ΥΝΕΓΔΗΜ[ΟΥ ΚΑΙ ΦΙΛ]ΑΓ[ΑΘ]ΟΝ ΔΙΑΙ[Ο]Ν ΚΕΡΔΩΝΑΚΟΥ (?) ΚΑΙ
[Π]ΑΡΑΦΙΛΑΓΑΘΟ[Ν]------ΙΟΝ ΦΟΡΓΑΒΑΚ[ΟΥ] ΚΑΙ [ΝΕΑ]ΝΙΣ-
[Κ]ΑΡΧΗΝ ΔΗΜΗΤ[ΡΙΟΝ ΑΠΟ]ΛΛΩΝΙΟΥ ΚΑΙ ΓΥΜ(Ν]ΑΣΙΑ[ΡΧΗΝ] ΒΑ -
[ΣΙ]ΛΕΙΔΗΝ ΘΕΟΝ[ΕΙΚ]Ο[Υ ΚΑΙ Α]ΤΤΑΝ ΗΡΑΚΛΕΙΔΟΥ ΦΙΛΟ[Ν]? ΤΗΣ
[ΣΥ]ΝΟΔΟΥ [ΚΑΙ] ΟΙ ΛΟ[ΙΠΟ]Ι [ΘΙΑ]ΣΪΤΑΙ· ΆΡΔΑΡΑΚΟΣ ΖΙΑ---ΟΥ, ΔΗ[ΜΗΤ]ΡΙΟΣ------ΟΥ, ΛΕΙΜΑΝΟΣ ΦΙΔΑ,
[ΜΙ]ΔΑΧΟΣ?-------ΑΝΟΥ, Ά[ΣΚ]ΛΗΠΙΑΔΗΣ ΟΥΑΛΕ[Ρ]ΙΟΥ
. .Γ?ΟΔΑΝ[Ο]Σ [ΔΗΜΗΤ?]ΡΙΟΥ, [Μ]ΕΝΕΣΤΡΑΤΟΣ ΛΥΚΙΣ [ΚΟ]Υ --------ΙΚΑΧΟ[Υ], ΔΙΟΦΑΝΤ[ΟΣ] ΔΕΙΟΥ, ΠΟΠΛ[ΙΟ]Σ 15-----------ΔΑ, ΗΡΑΚΛΕΙΔ[ΗΣ] ΕΠΙΓΟΝΟΥ, ΊΑΡΔΟ---------------[Δ] ΗΜΗΤΡΙΟΥ, Α[Φ]ΡΟΔΕΙΣΙΟΣ ΧΡΥΣΕ-
[ΡΩΤΟΣ, ΦΑΛ]ΔΑ[ΡΑ]ΝΟΣ ΑΠΟΛΛΩΝΙΟΥ, ΦΙΛΙΠ-
[ΠΟΣ]------------ΝΟ[Υ], ΚΑΛΟΫΣ ΑΘΗΝΙΟΥ, ΚΟΦΑΡΝΟΣ --------------------------------[Τ]ΡΥΦΩΝ ΑΝΔΡΟΜ[ΕΝ]ΟΥΣ,20 Ο-------------------------ΧΟΡΟΑΘΟΥ, ΘΕΟΤΕΙΜΟΣ ΨΥΧΑ-
ΡΙΩΝ[ΟΣ]----------ΔΙΒΑΛΟΣ ΦΑΡ[ΝΑΚΟΥ], ΕΫΙΟΣ 'ΡΟ-
ΔΩΝ[ΟΣ, ΗΡΑ]ΚΛΕΙΔΗΣ "ΑΤΤ[Α----------------'ΑΡΙΣ]-
ΤΟΔ[ΗΜΟΥ, Σ]ΥΜΜΑΧΟΣ ΣΑ---------------
ΚΟΣ----------------------------
25 ΦΙΛΟ------------------------------
ΟΡΑΝΣ - - - [ΖΩΡΘΪ? ]ΝΟΣ ΒΕ [ ΛΛΙΚΟΥ?]------
'ΡΑΔΑΜ[ΕΙΣΤΟΣ?)------ΦΑΔΙΝΑ[ΜΟΥ]------
ΜΥΡ[ΩΝ? ]----------ΜΑΣΤΟΫ------------
ΠΟ------------ΟΣ ΆΡΔΑ[ΡΑΚΟΥ?]------
50 ΦΙΔ[Α]----------ΝΟΣ ΧΑΡΙ[ΤΩΝ--------:Α]-
ΡΑΘΙ--------------------------
ΈΝ Τ[Ωι-----ΕΤΕΙ ΚΑΙ ΜΗ]ΝΙ ΛΩ[Ωι]-----

English translation:

God the Supreme. May it be with fortune!

In the time of the reign of king Tiberius Julius Sauromates, Friend of Caesar and of the people of Rome, Pious. The devotional assembly with the priest Julius, the son of Rhalchades, at the head, and the father of the devotional assembly Horuat[a, the son of ---]o[---], and the gathered devotional assembly, with Ardarak, the son of [S]ynegdemus, and the noble Diaion, the son of Kerdonak (?) and the very noble [---]ion, the son of Forgabak, and the leader of the youth Demetrius, the son of Apollonius, and the gymnasium instructor Basilides, the son of Theonicus, and Atta, the son of Heraclius, a friend of the devotional assembly. And the remaining members: Ardarakos, the son of Zia-[---]on, Demetrius, the son of [---]on, Leimanus, the son of Phidas [Mi]dach?, the son of [---]an, Asklepiades the son of Valerius. [--g?]odan, the son of Demetrius, Menestratus, the son of Lyciscus, [the son of -----]ikachus, Diophantus, the son of Deius, Poplius [the son of -----]din, Heraclius, the son of Epigon, Iardo[---------], the son of Demetrius, Aphrodisius, the son of Chryserotus, [Phal]da[ra]nos, the son of Apollonius, Philip [the son of –------]n, Kaloys, the son of Athenius, Kopharnos [the son of -------------] [T]ryphon, the son of Andromenes, o [--------------], the son of Horoath, Theotimus, the son of Psycharion, [-----]dibal, the son of Far[nak], Euios, the son of Rodon, [Hera]clius, the son of At[i, --------- the son of Aris]-tod [emus, S]ymmachus, the son of Sa[---------], kos[----------------] philo[---------------] orano[--- Zorthi?]n, the son of Be[lik?], Radam[istus?], the son of [---], the son of Phadina[mos] Myr[on?], the son of [-----], the son of Mastoy[s------] po[-------]os, the son of Ardarak, [----] Fid[a, the son of -------]n, Chari[ton, the son of -----], [A]- rathi[----, the son of -----------] in [the year and month] Lo[u] [---]

== Tanais Tablet B ==
Tablet B is the smaller inscription, measuring 1.053 m × 0.71 m × 0.08 m (41.5 in × 28.0 in × 3.1 in) and dated to 220 AD (517 according to the Bosporan calculation of time). This inscription is younger, which is apparent as it mentions Tiberius Julius Rhescuporis III, the son of Sauromates II. This inscription sustained less damage, having broken into four parts and being relatively readable. On it are engraved twenty lines in Greek monumental capitals. Cited in the sixth, seventh, eighth, and ninth lines, along with the names of their fathers, are the four leaders of the city of Tanais at the time when this monument was erected (Hofarno, Babos, Niblobor, and Horoathos). The monument was erected because of the renovation of the central square in the city of Tanais.

Greek original:

ΑΓΑΘΗΙ ΤΥΧΗΙ.

ΕΠΙ ΒΑΣΙΛΕΙ ΡΗΣΚΟΥΠΟΡΙΔΙ, ΥΙΩ
ΜΕΓΑΛΟΥ ΒΑΣΙΛΕΩΣ ΣΑΥΡΟΜΑΤΟΥ, ΚΑ[Ι]
ΖΗΝΩΝ ΦΑΝΝΕΩΣ ΠΡΕΣΒΕΥΤΗ ΒΑ-
ΣΙΛΕΩΣ ΡΗΣΚΟΥΠΟΡΙΔΟΣ, ΚΑΙ ΧΟ-
ΦΑΡΝΟΥ ΣΑΝΔΑΡΖΙΟΥ, ΒΑΒΟΣ ΒΑΙΟ-
ΡΑΣΠΟΥ, ΝΙΒΛΟΒΩΡΟΣ ΔΟΣΥΜΟΞΑΡ–
ΘΟΥ, ΧΟΡΟΑΘΟΣ ΣΑΝΔΑΡΖΙΟΥ ΑΡΧΟΝ–
ΤΕΣ ΤΑΝΑΕΙΤΩΝ, ΧΟΦΡΑΖΜΟΣ ΦΟΡΓΑ-
ΒΑΚΟΥ, ΒΑΣΙΛΕΙΔΗΣ ΘΕΟΝΕΙΚΟΥ ΕΛ-
ΛΗΝΑΡΧΗΣ ΕΞΑΡΤΙΣΑΣ ΤΗΝ ΑΓΟΡΑΝ
ΕΚ ΤΩΝ ΙΔΙΩΝ ΑΝΑΛΩΜΑΤΩΝ ΑΠΕΚΑ–
ΤΕΣΤΗΣΑ ΤΗ ΠΟΛΕΙ ΚΑΙ ΤΟΙΣ ΕΜΠΟ-
ΡΟΙΣ ΔΙΑ ΕΠΙΜΕΛΗΤΩΝ ΖΗΝΩΝΟΣ ΦΑ[Ν-
Ν]ΕΩΣ, ΦΑΡΝΟΞΑΡΘΟΥ ΤΑΥΡΕΟΥ,
ΦΑΛΔΑΡΑΝΟΥ ΑΠΟΛΛΩΝΙΟΥ ΚΑΙ
[ΑΡ]ΧΙΤΕΚΤΟΝΩΝ ΔΙΟΦΑΝΤΟΥ ΝΕ-
ΟΠΟΛΟΥ ΚΑ[Ι] ΑΥΡΗΛΙΟΥ ΑΝΤΩΝΕ[Ι]-
ΝΟΥ, ΝΑΥΑΚΟΣ ΜΕΥΑΚΟΥ.

EΝ ΤΩ ΖΙΦ'.

English translation:

May it be with fortune!

In the time of king Rhescuporis, the son of the great king Sauromates, and Zenon, the son of Phannes, emissary of king Rhescuporis, and [in the time of] Hopharnas, the son of Sandarzios, Babos, the son of Baioraspes, Nibloboros, the son of Dosymoxarthos, Horoathos, the son of Sandarz, the archons of the Tanaisians, Hophrazmos, the son of Phorgabakos, Basilides, the son of Theoneicus, the hellenarch. Prepared by the council at their own expense once again renovate [the square] for the city and the merchants, through the supervision of Zenon, the son of Phannes, Pharnoxarthos, the son of Taureus, Phaldaranos, the son of Apollonius, and the architect Diophantus, the son of Neopolus and Aurelius, the son of Antoninus, Nauakos, the son of Meuakos.

The year 517.

== See also ==
- White Croats
- White Croatia
- Origin hypotheses of the Croats
