= Hrvat =

Hrvat means Croat in South Slavic languages.

Hrvat may also refer to:

- MF Hrvat (built 2007), a ship owned by Croatian shipping company Jadrolinija
- Rajko Hrvat (born 1986), Slovenian rower
- Fahrija Hrvat (born 1949), Bosnian footballer

== See also ==
- Horvat
- Hrovat
- Hrvatski (disambiguation)
