= Jaroslava Maxová =

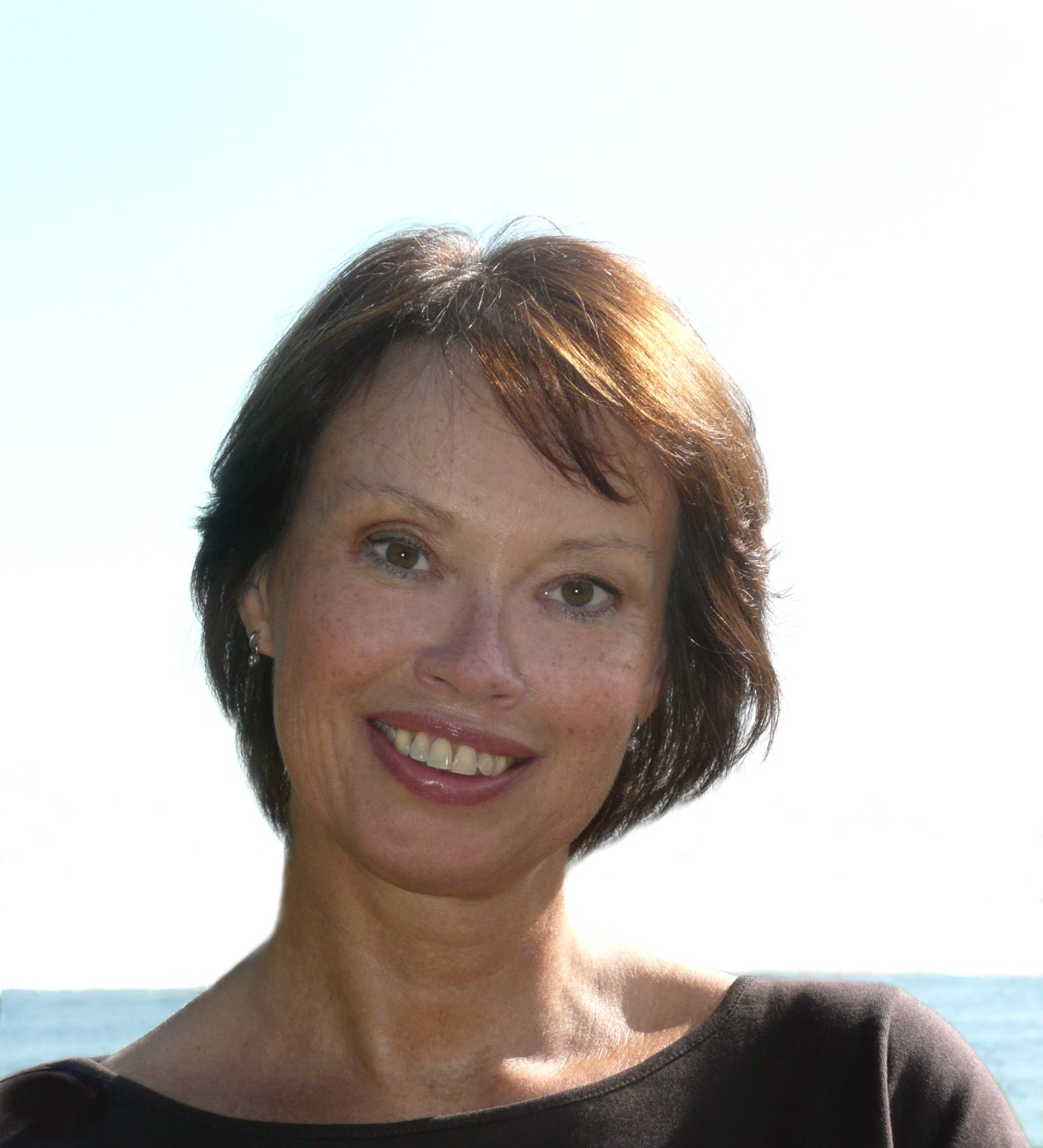

Background information
- Born: Jaroslava Horská; 6 April 1957 (age 69); Moravská Třebová, Czechoslovakia
- Genre: Opera
- Occupation: Singer
- Instrument: Vocals
- Website: maxova.com

Jaroslava Maxová (born 6 April 1957; Jaroslava Horská, Jaroslava Horská-Maxová) is a Czech mezzo-soprano opera singer and vocal coach.

== Biography ==
Jaroslava Maxová was born on 6 April 1957 in Moravská Třebová, Moravia and studied singing at the Bratislava Academy in Slovakia. She made her Slovak National Opera début already during her studies and became a soloist there in 1986. She sang principal roles throughout the next eight years and since 1994 continued to do so at the Prague National Opera Theatre.

Her repertoire includes Strauss‘ Octavian in Der Rosenkavalier, Offenbach's Niklausse in Les contes d’Hoffmann, Verdi's Amneris in Aida, Fenena in Nabucco, Maddalena in Rigoletto, Preziosilla in La forza del destino, Mozart's Dorabella in Così fan tutte, Cherubino and Marcellina in Le nozze di Figaro and Sesto in La clemenza di Tito, Rossini's Berta in Il barbiere di Siviglia, Tchaikovsky's Olga in Eugene Onegin, Bizet's Mercedes in Carmen, Mascagni's Lola in Cavalleria rusticana, Martinů’s Filoména in Alexander Twice, Gluck's Orpheus in Orpheus and Eurydice, Dvořák's Witch in Rusalka and Kate in The Devil and Kate, Smetana's Radmila in Libuše and Háta in The Bartered Bride, Handel's Ulysses in Deidamia, Purcell's Witch in Dido and Aeneas, Britten's Miss Jessel in The Turn of the Screw, Janáček's Varvara in Káťa Kabanová, Kedruta in The Excursions of Mr Brouček and Pastuchyňa (Herdswoman) in Jenůfa.

== Discography ==
- 1986 Wolfgang Amadeus Mozart: Requiem [Zdeněk Košler, conductor] [CD]. Czechoslovakia: Opus
- 1989 Perosi, Lorenzo: Stabat Mater, Dies Iste, L'Inno della Pace. [Arturo Sacchetti, conductor] [CD]. Vaticano, Italy: Frequenz
- 1997 Zandonai, Riccardo: Francesca da Rimini. [Fabio Luisi, conductor] [CD]. Vienna, Austria: KOCH International
- 1997 Donizetti, Gaetano: Messa da Requiem. [Alexander Rahbari, conductor] [CD]. Vienna, Austria: KOCH International
- 2002 Klusák, Jan: Zpráva pro akademii, Bertram a Mescalinda. [ Přemysl Charvát, conductor] [CD]. Prague, Czech Republic: National theatre.
- 2005 Wagner, Richard: Der Ring des Nibelungen [John Fiore, conductor] [CD]. Prague, Czech Republic: National theatre
- 2009 Goldscheider, Alexander: The Song of Songs. [CD]. London, United Kingdom: Romantic Robot

== Collaboration with composers ==
- Peter Maxwell Davies
- Jan Klusák
- Alexander Goldscheider
- Alexander Rudajev

== Sources ==
- Theatre Institute; Jaroslava Maxova (in English, p. 44)
- National Theatre; archive; Jaroslava Maxova (in Czech)
- Czech singers; Jaroslava Maxova (in Czech)
- Muzikus; Jaroslava Maxova (in Czech)
- The Free Library; Report on the condition of opera in the Czech Republic; Jaroslava Maxova (in English)
- MusicWeb; CD REVIEW; Jaroslava Maxova (in English)

== Literature ==
- Janota, Dalibor; Kučera, Jan P. Malá encyklopedie české opery. Prague (Czech Republic), Litomyšl (Czech Republic): Paseka, 1999. ISBN 80-7185-236-8
- Poledňák, Ivan. Vášeň rozumu. Olomouc (Czech Republic): Univerzita Palackého, 2004. ISBN 80-244-0932-1
