= Horvat =

- Language: Croatian

Origin
- Meaning: Croat
- Region of origin: Croatia

Other names
- Variant forms: Horváth; Hrovat; Horvatić

Horvat is a surname of Croatian origin. It is the most frequent surname in Croatia and the second most frequent in Slovenia. Its variant Horvath is very frequent in Hungary and Slovakia.

In Croatia, Horvat is the older version of the word Hrvat, an autonym used by Croats. In parts of central Croatia, people still call themselves Horvati and their country Horvatska. In the 2011 census, it was the most common last name in the City of Zagreb, Zagreb County, Krapina-Zagorje County, Varaždin County, Koprivnica-Križevci County, Bjelovar-Bilogora County, and Virovitica-Podravina County.

The majority of Croats with surname Horvat live in the Kajkavian dialect region in Croatia proper. Apart from them, there is a certain number of ethnic Serbs with surname Horvat in the Baranja region of Croatia.

In Slovenia, almost half of the citizens with the surname Horvat live in the Prekmurje region, where it is the most common surname by far. It is also common in Lower Styria and in Ljubljana, while it is very rare in western Slovenia.

== People ==
- Alexander Horvát (born 2000), Slovak footballer
- Andraš Horvat (1744–1789), Croatian author and cultural activist who worked among the Hungarian Slovenes
- Bo Horvat (born 1995), Canadian ice hockey player
- Branko Horvat (1928–2003), Croatian economist and politician
- Danielle Horvat (born 1991), Australian actress
- Darko Horvat (disambiguation), multiple people
- Drago Horvat (born 1958), Yugoslav ice hockey player
- Dmitry Horvat (1858–1937), Russian lieutenant general
- Edi Horvat (born 1998), Croatian footballer
- Feri Horvat (1941–2020), Slovenian politician
- Frank Horvat (1928–2020), Italian photographer
- Grant Horvat (born 1998), American golfer and YouTuber
- Hrvoje Horvat (born 1946), Croatian handball player and coach
- Hrvoje Horvat, Jr. (born 1977), Croatian handball player and coach
- Ivan Horvat (disambiguation), multiple people
- Ivica Horvat (1926–2012), Croatian footballer
- John Horvat (died 1394), Croatian nobleman
- Josip Horvat Međimurec (1904–1945), Croatian painter
- Jovan Horvat (1722–1786), Russian general of Serbian descent
- Joža Horvat (1915–2012), Croatian writer and sailor
- Lidija Horvat (born 1982), Croatian handball player
- Lidija Horvat-Dunjko (born 1967), Croatian soprano
- Lili Horvát (born 1982), Hungarian film director
- Lucas Mario Horvat (born 1985), Slovenian footballer
- Mihaela Horvat (born 1994), Croatian footballer
- Mila Horvat (born 1981), Croatian TV host
- Milan Horvat (1919–2014), Croatian conductor
- Nikolina Horvat (born 1986), Croatian athlete
- Oleksandr Horvat (born 1995), Ukrainian footballer
- Paul Horvat (14th century), bishop of Zagreb
- Robert Horvat (born 1969), Ukrainian politician
- Rudolf Horvat (1873–1947), Croatian historian
- Ryan Horvat (born 1993), Canadian ice hockey player
- Sabrina Horvat (born 1997), Austrian footballer
- Srećko Horvat (born 1983), Croatian philosopher
- Stevan Horvat (1932–2018), Serbian wrestler
- Steve Horvat (born 1971), Australian football player
- Stjepan Horvat (1895–1985), Croatian geodesist and professor
- Tomi Horvat (born 1999), Slovenian footballer
- Zlatko Horvat (born 1984), Croatian handball player

== See also ==
- Horváth
- Hrovat
- Charvat
- Horvati (disambiguation)
