= Origin hypotheses of the Croats =

The Croats trace their origins to a southwards migration of some of the Early Slavs in the 6th- and 7th-centuries CE, a tradition supported by anthropological, genetic, and ethnological studies. However, the archaeological and other historic evidence on the migration of the Slavic settlers, on the character of the native population in the present-day territory of the Croatia, and on their mutual relationships suggests diverse historical and cultural influences.

== Croatian ethnogenesis ==
The definition of Croatian ethnogenesis begins with the definition of ethnicity, according to which an ethnic group is a socially defined category of people who identify with each other based on common ancestral, social, cultural or other experience, and which shows a certain durability over the long period term of time. In the Croatian case, there is no doubt that in the Early Middle Ages a certain group identified themselves by ethnonym Hrvati (Croats), and was identified as such by the others. It also had a political connotation, it continued to expand, and since the Late Middle Ages explicitly identified with the nation, although not in the exact meaning as of the contemporary modern nation.

In the case of the present-day Croatian nation, several components or phases influenced its ethnogenesis:

- the indigenous prehistoric component which dates from Stone Age, before 40,000 years, and the younger Neolithic culture like Danilo dated 4700–3900 BC, and Eneolithic culture like Vučedol dated 3000 and 2200 BC.
- the protohistoric component, which includes ancient people like Illyrians (including the Dalmatae and Liburnians in coastal Croatia, and the Pannonii in continental Croatia); Celtic or mixed Celtic-Illyrian people, such as the Iapodes, Taurisci and Scordisci also existed for a time in continental Croatia. In the 4th century BC there also existed a few Greek colonies on the Adriatic islands and coast.
- the classical antiquity component caused by the Roman conquest, which included a mixture of ancient Illyrian people and Rome's colonists and legionaries; there was also a temporary presence of Iranian-speaking Iazyges on the border of Roman Dalmatia at this time.
- the Late Antiquity-Early Middle Ages component from the Migration Period, started by the Huns, and which in Croatia included in the first phase Visigoths and Suebi, who didn't stay for a long period of time, and Ostrogoths, Gepids and Langobards, who formed the brief Ostrogothic Kingdom (493-553 AD). In the second phase occurred the Slavic migrations to the Balkans, often associated with the Pannonian Avars' activity.
- the final Middle Ages-Modern Age component, which included the presence of Magyars/Hungarians, Italians/Venetians, Germans/Saxons and others. After the 14th century, because of the black death, and the late 15th century, because of Ottoman invasion, the Croatian ethnonym expanded from the historic Croatian lands to Western Slavonia, which caused Zagreb to become capital city of the Croatian Kingdom, and to become incorporated with the population ethnogenesis of that territory. The Ottoman invasion caused many migrations of the people within the Balkans and in Croatia, like those of the Serbs and Vlachs, but the upcoming world wars and social events also influenced the Croatian ethnogenesis.

=== Old historical sources ===
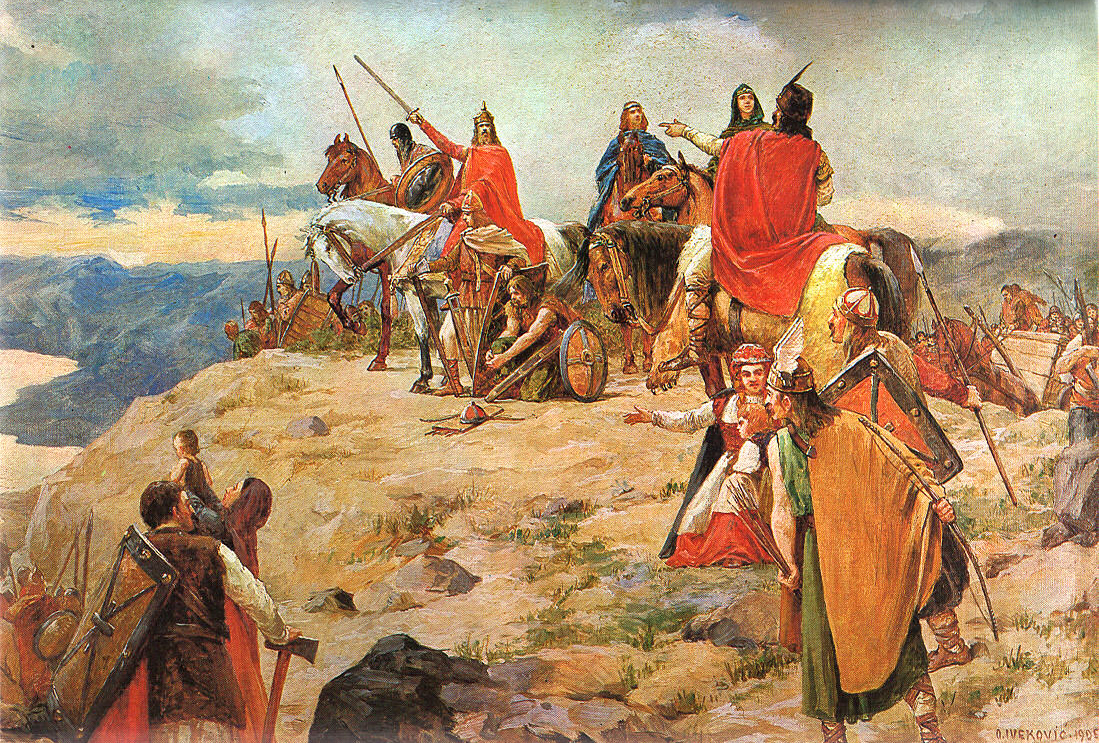
The Coming of the Croats to the Adriatic (1905) by Oton Iveković

The mention of the Croatian ethnonym Hrvat for a specific tribe before the 9th century is not yet completely confirmed. According to Constantine VII's work De Administrando Imperio (10th century), a group of Croats separated from the White Croats who lived in White Croatia and arrived by their own will, or were called by the Byzantine Emperor Heraclius (610–641), to Dalmatia where they fought and defeated the Avars, and eventually organized their own principality. According to the legend preserved in the work, they were led by five brothers Κλουκας (Kloukas), Λόβελος (Lobelos), Κοσέντζης (Kosentzis), Μουχλώ (Mouchlo), Χρωβάτος (Chrobatos), and two sisters Τουγά (Touga) and Βουγά (Bouga), and their archon at the time was father of Porga, and they were baptized during the rule of Porga in the 7th century. This is documented in chapter 30 and 31 of Constantine VII's work.

The old historical sources do not give an exact indication of the ethnogenesis of these early Croats. Constantine VII does not identify Croats with Slavs, nor does he point to differences between them. John Skylitzes in his work Madrid Skylitzes identified Croats and Serbs as Scythians. Nestor the Chronicler in his Primary Chronicle identified White Croats with West Slavs along Vistula river, with other Croats included in the East Slavic tribal union. The Chronicle of the Priest of Duklja identifies Croats with the Goths who remained after king Totila occupied the province of Dalmatia. Similarly, Thomas the Archdeacon in his work Historia Salonitana mentions that seven or eight tribes of nobles, which he called "Lingones", arrived from Poland and settled in Croatia under Totila's leadership.

== Research history ==
The Croatian ethnonym Hrvat, as well of those five brothers and sisters and the early ruler Porga, are often not considered to be of Slavic origin, yet again, are quite original to be a pure fabrication of Constantine VII. As such, the origin of the early Croats before and at the time of arrival to the present day Croatia, as well as their ethnonym, were an eternal topic of historiography, linguistics and archaeology. However, the theories were often elaborated in non-scientific terms, supported by specific ideological intentions, and often by political and cultural intentions of the time. This kind of interpretations caused a lot of damage to certain theories and actual scientific community. It should be taken into serious consideration whether the origin of the early Croatian tribes can be regarded also as the origin of Croatian nation, and can only be asserted that the Croats as are known today as a nation became only when Croatian tribes arrived and assimilated other populations in the territory of present-day Croatia.

=== Slavic theory ===
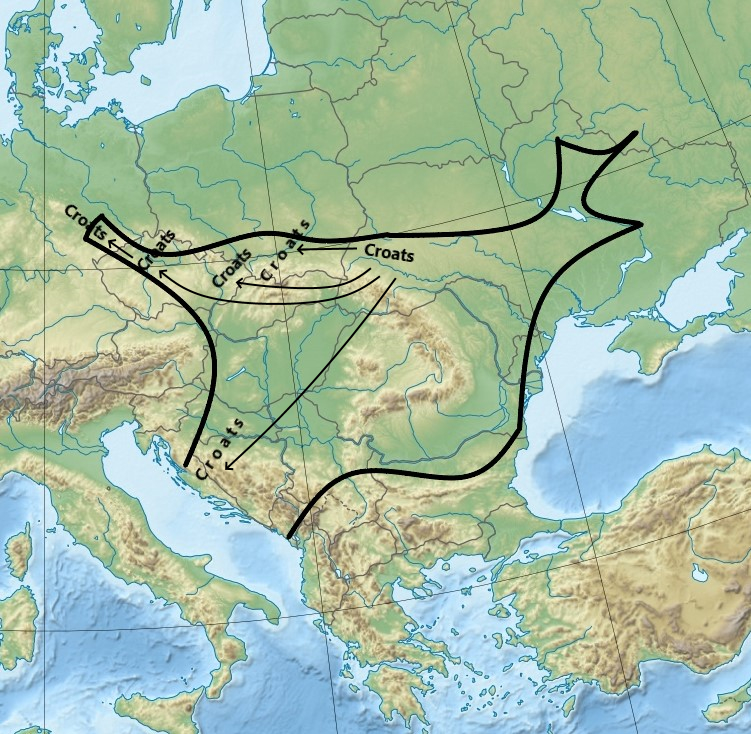
The range of Slavic ceramics of the Prague-Penkovka culture marked in red, all known ethnonyms of Croats are within this area. Presumable migration routes of Croats are indicated by arrows, per V. V. Sedov (1979).

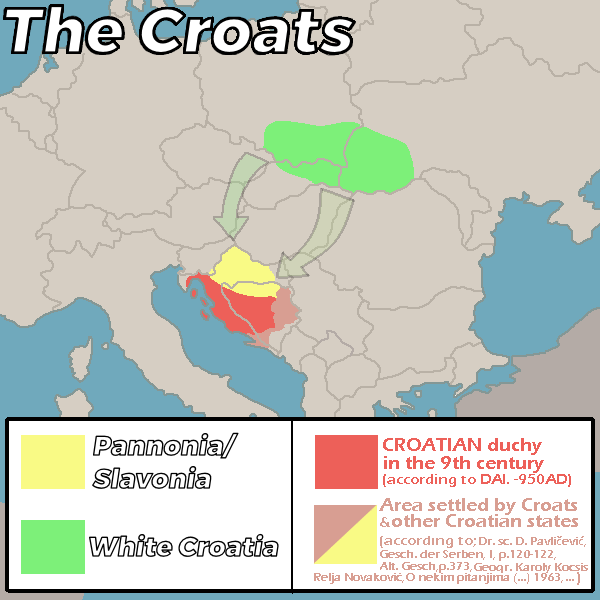
Migration routes of White Croats from White Croatia.

The Slavic theory, in extreme form also known as the Pan-Slavic theory, is the idea that the Slavs came to Illyricum from Poland dating back at least to the 12th century. With the development of Croatian historiography since the 17th century was elaborated in realistic terms, and considered Croats as one of the Slavic groups which settled in their modern-day homeland during the migration period. Constantine the VII's work was particularly researched by the 17th century historian Ivan Lučić, who concluded that the Croats came from White Croatia on the other side of the Carpathian mountains, in "Sarmatia" ("Poland", placing them in Eastern Galicia), with which historians today mostly agree upon.

In the late 19th century, the most significant impacts on future historiography was the work of Franjo Rački, and the intellectual and political circle around Josip Juraj Strossmayer. Rački's view of the unified arrival of the Croats and Serbs to the "partially empty house", fit the ideological frameworks of Yugoslavism and Pan-Slavism. The ideas by Rački were furtherly developed by historian Ferdo Šišić in his seminal work History of the Croats in the Age of the Croat Rulers (1925). The work is considered as the foundation stone for later historiography. However, in the first and second Yugoslavia, the Pan-Slavic (pure-Slavic) theory was particularly emphasized because of the political context and was the only officially accepted theory by the regime, while other theories which attributed non-Slavic origin and components were ignored and not accepted, and even their supporters, because of also political reasons, were persecuted (Milan Šufflay, Kerubin Šegvić, Ivo Pilar). The official theory also ignored some historical sources, like the account of Constantine VII, and considered that the Croats and Serbs were the same Slavic people who arrived in one and the same migration, and unwilling to consider foreign elements in those separate societies. There were Yugoslavian scholars like Ferdo Šišić and Nada Klaić who allowed limited non-Slavic origin of certain elements in Croatian ethnogenesis, but they were usually connected with the Pannonian Avars and Bulgars. The main difficulty of the Pan-Slavic theory was the Croatian ethnonym which could not be derived from the Slavic language.

The Slavic theory about the 7th century migration from Zakarpattia or Lesser Poland remains the mainstream historiographical and archaeological theory. According to extensive folklore and other studies by Radoslav Katičić, the Slavdom of the Croats is unquestionable, as well as the survival of some autochthonous elements, while the Iranian origin of their ethnonym is the least unlikely. With this conclusion also agreed other scholars like Ivo Goldstein, and John Van Antwerp Fine Jr.

==== Autochthonous-Slavic theory ====
Autochthonous-Slavic theory dates back to the Croatian Renaissance, which was supported by Vinko Pribojević and Juraj Šižgorić. There's no doubt that the Croatian language belongs to the Slavic languages, but they considered that Slavs were autochthonous in Illyricum and their ancestors were old Illyrians. It developed among the Dalmatian humanists, and was also considered by early modern writers, like Matija Petar Katančić, Mavro Orbini and Pavao Ritter Vitezović. This cultural and romanticist idea was especially promoted by the national Illyrian Movement and their leader Ljudevit Gaj in the 19th century.

According to the autochthonous model, the Slavs homeland was in the area of former Yugoslavia, and they spread northwards and westwards rather than the other way round, which is "completely untenable". A revision of the theory, developed by Ivan Mužić in 1989, argues that Slavic migration from the north did happen, but the actual number of Slavic settlers was small and that the autochthonous ethnic substratum was prevalent in the formation of the Croats, but that contradicts and does not answer the presence of a predominant Slavic language, The social and linguistical situation of the pre-Slavic population is hard to reconstruct, especially if one accepts the theory that the autochthonous population was dominant at the time of the arrival of the Slavs yet accepted the language and culture of Slavic newcomers who were in the minority. The assumptions that the Illyrians were an ethnolinguistic homogeneous entity were rejected in the 20th century, and according to the scholars who support the Danube basin hypothesis of the Slavic homeland, it is considered that some proto-Slavic tribes existed even before the Slavic migration to Southeastern Europe. However, this theory has been scientifically discredited and rejected, having an Anti-Slavic sentiment.

==== Constructionist late-migration theory ====
The "constructionist" late-migration theory was initially argued by Lujo Margetić in 1977. The theory tried to give a combined answer to the late appearance of the Croatian ethnonym in the historical sources (certainly only since the mid-9th century), and the lack of archaeological findings dating to the 7th and 8th century which would attest to a mass migration of early Slavs. Although Margetić later rejected own theory, it was accepted by Nada Klaić, arguing that the Croats participated in the Frank-Avar war under Frankish leadership and arrived in the early 9th century from Carantania to Dalmatia which was already populated by other Slavs. Later, the theory influenced the ideological exhibition "Hrvati i Karolinzi" (2000) and formation of a new theory about the late 8th and early 9th century migration of Croats as Slavic vassals of Franks during the Frank-Avar war advanced by exhibition's core crew and related scholars, including, Mladen Ančić, Ante Milošević, Miljenko Jurković, Nikola Jakšić, Vladimir Sokol and Neven Budak, each with different and mostly "culture-historical" approaches. For example, M. Ančić saw a connection in ethnonyms and toponyms between Polabia and Western Balkans as well appearance of Carolingian military equipment in the 9th century, and A. Milošević argued that the Viking-Carolingian swords of K-type of Nordic (Viking) originating to the second half of the 8th century emerged in the Eastern Adriatic hinterland with the southward migration of the Croats (under Carolingian supervision). Similar to autochthonous theory, it advances the idea that the Slavs and Croats came as a minority among more numerous autochthonous population without much discontinuity (aside Sokol who was open to a mass migration of Croats). By 2018, the core paradigm of the 2000 exhibition managed to reshape the post-Yugoslavian scholarly perception about the Byzantine and Carolingian influence in the Western Balkans (giving more prominence to the latter), but failed to have national and international success among scholars who did not participate in the exhibition on the discussion about the origin and migration of the Croats.

The theory already since 1970s is criticized and rejected by mainstream scholarship because is misinterpreting written sources and archaeological data which shows the 7th century Slavic-Croatian migration and settlement, and there was not any discontinuity in transition between the 8th and 9th century. Walter Pohl also noted that "has no basis in the written sources and, also, the case of an 'empty land' in the Western Balkans at the end of the eighth century seems unlikely". There is no presumed "absence of any finds whatsoever between the middle of the 7th and the end of the 8th centuries" as the "recent datings of the finds and cemeteries of the so-called horizon with pagan burial characteristics (as well as cremation burials), whether through typological analyses, or 14C dates, definitely refute this viewpoint". Similarity of Slavic ethnonyms and toponyms is not a convincing argument and they would be expected. There was not any detectable new foreign group in the 9th century neither such a group and Croats, as well their migration, are mentioned in detailed Frankish historical sources. Viking-Carolingian swords and other military equipment do not indicate arrival of a new ethnic group (neither was found on the territory of Obotrites in Vojvodina; many such swords and equipment were found outside Carolingian domain, like in Denmark who were enemies of the Franks). How much is problematic to identify swords with an ethnic group and individual was showcased by DNA analysis of a late 8th-early 9th century skeleton with a sword in Vaćani near Skradin which confirmed it descended from Cyprus (whereas without such an analysis according to the theory would have been considered as an ethnic Croat). Also, Milošević's considerations about a Scandinavian origin of the K-type swords is controversial because it contrasts with mainstream opinion considering them as being characteristic of Frankish workshops. The Carolingian military equipment rather influenced the consolidation of the Croatian ethnic identity and elite in the Duchy of Croatia as well their relations with the Carolingian Empire.

==== Post-structuralist elite-cultural model theory ====
Most recently the late 1990s "post-structuralist" theory of the Slavic elite cultural model was created by Florin Curta, and later supported by Danijel Dzino and Francesco Borri. It revisionistically deconstructs the early Slavs, argues the spreading of Slavs as a cultural model invented by the Byzantines without much migration, disregarding and reinterpreting much of historical sources (considering them as "propaganda"), and focuses on construction of identities and narratives. It sees the early Slavs and Croats with their identity as an elite whose name would be imposed by the Byzantines to the heterogenous population living on Roman lands after Roman societal collapse because of which was managed to be imposed Slavic/Croatian identity, language and customs on native population which ceased to be Roman, and emergence of new Slavic states like Croatia. Alike previous two theories, it also advances the idea that the Slavs came as a minority among more numerous autochthonous population. Curta's theorization can be "hardly accepted".

=== Gothic theory ===
The Gothic theory, which dates back to the late 12th- and 13th-century work by Priest of Duklja and Thomas the Archdeacon, without excluding that some Gothic segments could survive the collapse of Gothic Kingdom and were included in Croatian ethnogenesis, is based on almost none concrete evidence to identify Croats with the Goths, motivated by Anti-Slavic sentiment. In 1102, Croatian Kingdom entered a personal union with Kingdom of Hungary. It is considered that this identification of Croats with Goths could be based on a local Croatian Trpimirović dynastic myth from the 11th century, paralleling Hungarian Árpád dynasty's myth of originating from the Hunnic leader Attila.

Some scholars like Nada Klaić considered that Thomas the Archdeacon despised Slavs/Croats and that wanted to depreciate them as barbarians with Goths identification, however, until the time of Renaissance the Goths were seen as noble barbarians compared to Huns, Avars, Vandals, Langobards, Magyars and Slavs, and as such he would not identify them with the Goths. Also, in the Thomas the Archdeacon's work the starting emphasis is on the decadence of people from Salona, and as such scholars consider the emergence of newcomers Goths/Croats was actually seen as a kind of God's scourge for sinful Romans.

Scholars like Ludwig Gumplowicz and Kerubin Šegvić literally read the medieval works and considered Croats as Goths who were eventually Slavicized, and that the ruling caste was formed from the foreign warrior element. The idea was argued with the Gothic suffix mære (mer, famous) found among the names of Croatian dukes on stone and written inscriptions, as well Slavic suffix slav (famous), and that mer eventually was changed with mir (peace) because the Slavs twisted the interpretation of the names according their language. The ethnonym Hrvat was derived from the Germanic-Gothic Hrôthgutans, the hrōþ (victory, glory) and gutans (common historical name for the Goths). During World War II, the Gothic theory was the only supported theory by the regime of Independent State of Croatia (NDH).

=== Iranian theory ===
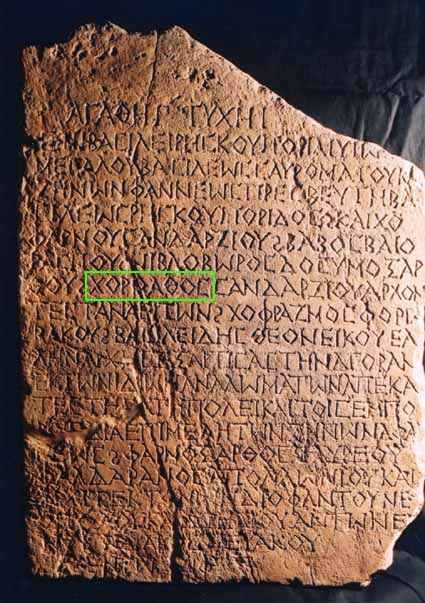
Photo of the Tanais Tablets B containing the word Χοροάθος (Horoáthos).

The Iranian, also known as Iranian-Caucasian theory, dates to the 1797 and the doctoral dissertation by Josip Mikoczy-Blumenthal who, as the dissertation mysteriously disappeared in 1918 and was preserved only a short review, considered that Croats originated from Sarmatians who were descending from Medes in North-Western Iran. In 1853 were discovered the two Tanais Tablets. They are written in Greek, and were founded in the Greek colony of Tanais in the late 2nd and early 3rd century AD, at the time when the colony was surrounded by Sarmatians. On the larger inscription is written the father of the devotional assembly Horouathon and the son of Horoathu, while on the smaller inscription Horoathos, the son of Sandarz, the archons of the Tanaisians, which resembles the usual variation of Croatian ethnonym Hrvat - Horvat. Some scholars use these tablets only to explain the etymology, and not necessarily the ethnogenesis.

The Iranian theory entered the historical science from three, initially independent ways, from historical-philological, art history, and religion history, in the first half of the 20th century. The last two were supported by art historian scholars (Luka Jelić, Josef Strzygowski, Ugo Monneret de Villard), and religion historian scholars (Johann Peisker, Milan Šufflay, Ivo Pilar). The Slavic-Iranian cultural interrelation was pointed out by modern ethnologists, like Marijana Gušić who in the ritual Ljelje noticed the influence from Pontic-Caucasian-Iranian sphere, Branimir Gušić, and archaeologists Zdenko Vinski and Ksenija Vinski-Gasparini. However, the cultural and artistic indicators of Iranian origin, including indications in the religious sphere, is somehow difficult to determine. It is mostly Sassanian (224-651 AD) influences that were felt in the steppe regions.

The first scholar who connected the tablets' names with Croatian ethnonym was A. L. Pogodin in 1902. First who considered such a thesis and Iranian origin was Konstantin Josef Jireček in 1911. Ten years later, Al. I. Sobolevski gave the first systematic theory about the Iranian origin which until today did not change in basic lines. In the same year, independently Fran Ramovš, with reference to the Iranian interpretation of the name Horoathos by Max Vasmer, concluded that the early Croats were one of the Sarmatian tribes which during the great migration advanced along the outer edge of Carpathians (Galicia) to the Vistula and Elbe rivers. The almost final, and more in detail picture was given by Slovenian academic Ljudmil Hauptmann in 1935. He considered that Iranian Croats, after the Huns invasion around 370 when the Huns crossed the Volga river and attacked the Iranian Alans at the Don river, abandoned their initial Sarmatian lands and arrived among the Slavs at the waste lands north of Carpathians, where they gradually Slavicized. There they belonged to the Antes tribal polity until the Antes were attacked by the Avars in 560, and the polity was finally destroyed 602 by the same Avars. The thesis was subsequently supported by Francis Dvornik, George Vernadsky, Roman Jakobson, Tadeusz Sulimirski, and Oleg Trubachyov. Omeljan Pritsak considered early Croats a clan of Alan-Iranian origin which during the "Avarian pax" had frontiersman-merchant social role, while R. Katičić considered that there's not enough evidence that the non-Slavic Croats ruled as an elite class over Slavs who were under the rule of Avars.

The personal names on the Tanais Tablets are considered as a prototype of a certain ethnonym of a Sarmatian tribe those persons did descend from, and as well today is generally accepted that the Croatian name is of Iranian origin and that can be traced to the Tanais Tablets. However, the etymology itself is not enough strong evidence. The theory is further explained with the Avar's destruction of Antes tribal polity in 602, and that the early Croats migration and subsequent war with Avars in Dalmatia (during the reign of Heraclius 610-641) can be seen as a continuation of the war between Antes and Avars. That the early Croats marked the cardinal directions with colors, hence White Croats and White Croatia (Western) and Red Croatia (Southern), but the cardinal color designation, in general, indicates remnants of the widespread steppe peoples tradition. The heterogeneous composition of the Croatian legend in which are unusually mentioned two women leaders Touga and Bouga, which indicates to what the actual archaeological findings confirmed - the existence of "warrior women" known as Amazons among the Sarmatians and Scythians. As such, Trubachyov tried to explain the original proto-type of the ethnonym from adjectives *xar-va(n)t (feminine, rich in women), which derives from the etymology of Sarmatians, the Indo-Aryan *sar-ma(n)t (feminine), in both Indo-Iran adjective suffix -ma(n)t/wa(n)t, and Indo-Aryan and Indo-Iranian word *sar- (woman), which in Iranian gives *har.

Another interpretation was given by the scholar Jevgenij Paščenko; he considered that the Croats were a heterogeneous group of people belonging to the Chernyakhov culture, a poly-ethnic cultural mélange of mostly Slavs and Sarmatians, but also Goths, Getae and Dacians. There was happening an interrelation between Slavic and Iranian language and culture, seen for example in the toponymy. As such, under the ethnonym Hrvati should not be necessary seen a specific or even homogeneous tribe, yet archaic religion and mythology of a heterogeneous group of people of Iranian origin or influence who worshiped the solar deity Hors, from which possibly originates the Croatian ethnonym.

==== Persian theory ====
Another known more radical thesis, Iranian-Persian, of the Iranian theory was by Stjepan Krizin Sakač, who although gave insights on some issues, tried to follow the Croatian ethnonym as far the region Arachosia (Harahvaiti, Harauvatiš) and its people (Harahuvatiya) of the Achaemenid Empire (550–330 BC). However, although the suggestive similarity, it is etymologically incorrect. There were many supporters of the thesis and further tried to develop it, but the actual arguments are considered far-fetched, unscientific, and also with Anti-Slavic sentiment.

=== Avar theory ===
Avar, also known as Bulgar-Turkic theory, dates to the late 19th and early 20th century when John Bagnell Bury and Henri Grégoire noted the similarity between the Croatian legend of five brothers (and two sisters) with the Bulgar legend of Kubrat's five sons. This is further substantiated by the fact that this story is very similar to other adaptations of Herodotus (IV 33.3) "the Croatian migration did not take place, but ... Constantine Porphyrogenitus created it relying on the literary models traditionally applied to described the Landnahme of Scythian Barbarians." Bury considered that the White Croats' Chrobatos and Bulgars' Kubrat were the same person from the Bulgars ethnic group, as well derived the Croatian title Ban from the personal name of Avar khagan Bayan I and Kubrat's son Batbayan. Similarly Henry Hoyle Howorth asserted that the White Croats were a Bulgar warrior caste to whom was given land in the Western Balkans due to expulsion of the Pannonian Avars following the revolt of Kubrat against the Avar Khaganate.

The anti-primordialist theory was later developed by Otto Kronsteiner in 1978. He tried to prove that early Croats were an upper caste of Avar origin, which blended with Slavic nobility during the 7th and 8th centuries and abandoned their Avar language. As arguments for his thesis he considered the Tatar-Bashkir derivation of Croatian ethnonym; that Croats and Avars are almost always mentioned together; distribution of Avarian type of settlements where the Croatian ethnonym was as toponym, pagus Crouuati in Carinthia and Kraubath in Styria; this settlements had Avarian names with suffix *-iki (-itji); the commander of those settlements was Avarian Ban which name is located in the center of those settlements, Faning/Baniče < Baniki in Carinthia, and Fahnsdorf < Bansdorf in Styria; the Avarian officers titles, besides Mong.-Turk. Khagan, the Kosezes/Kasazes, Ban and Župan. Previously, by some Yugoslavian historians the toponym Obrov(ac) was also considered of Avar origin, and according to Kronsteiner's claims, which many Nada Klaić accepted, Klaić moved the ancient homeland of White Croats to Carantania.

However, according to Peter Štih and modern scholars, Kronsteiners arguments were assumptions that were not accepted as evidence by historians. Actually, the etymology derivation is one of many, and is not generally accepted; the Croats are mentioned along the Avars only in the Constantine VII's work, but always as enemies of the Avars, who destroyed and expelled their authority from Dalmatia; those settlements had widespread Slavic suffix ići, the settlements do not have the semicircular Avar type arrangement, and the Ban's settlements could not be his seat as are very small and are not found on any important crossroad or geographical location; the titles origin and derivation are unsolved, and they are not found among Avars and Avar language; toponyms with root Obrov derive from South Slavic verb "obrovati" (to dig a trench) and are mostly of later date (from the 14th century).

The theory was further developed by Walter Pohl. He noted the difference between infantry-agricultural (Slavic) and cavalry-nomadic (Avar) tradition, but did not negate that sometimes the situation was exactly the opposite, and often sources did not differentiate Slavs and Avars. He initially shared the Bury's opinion on the Kubrat's and Chrobatos' name and legends, and the mention of two sisters interpreted as additional elements which joined the alliance "by the maternal line", and noted that the symbolism of the number seven is often encountered in the steppe peoples. Pohl noted that the Kronsteiner's merit was that, instead of the previously usual "ethnic" ethnogenesis, he proposed a "social" one. As such, Croatian name would not be an ethnonym, but a social designation for a group of elite warriors of diverse origin which ruled over the conquered Slavic population on the Avar Khaganate's boundary, the designation eventually becoming an ethnonym imposed to the Slavic groups. The assertion about the boundary is only partly true because although the Croats were mentioned on the line of Khaganate they were mostly outside and not inside the boundaries. He did not support Kronstenier's derivation, nor consider the etymology important as it is impossible to establish the ethnic origin of "original Croats", i.e. the social categories which carried the title of "Hrvat".

Margetić, rejecting his late-migration theory, instead argued that the Croats were one of Bulgarian tribes and leading social class which were named in honor of Kubrat's victory over Avars. Denis Alimov additionally argued that the Croats "lived originally in the territory of the Carpathian Basin, being closely connected with the Avars, but then had to leave it, taking cover from the Avars behind mountain ranges [Dalmatian, Alpine, Silesian and Carpathian]", possibly due to conflict with the Avars as Kubrat's supporters in 630s. In the upcoming historical events and interactions in the region of Dalmatia finished the formation of the Croatian ethnic identity and ethno-political group of people, initially held and promoted by a heterogenous political and military elite of the same name.

Historians and archaeologists until now concluded that Avars never lived in Dalmatia proper (including Lika) yet somewhere in Pannonia. There are no Avar burial or other Avar archaeological findings in the territory of the early medieval principality of Croatia, or in the Eastern Adriatic coast and hinterland (until now were found only late Avar or post-Avar findings from late 8th-early 9th century, while older then that only in Vinkovci and further to the east in Slavonia). As concluded by archaeologist Maja Petrinec, "the presence of individual Avar objects in Dalmatia and Albania and generally along the eastern Adriatic coast, far from the Avar Khaganate proper, has usually been interpreted in the literature as a result of Avaro-Slavic incursions or spoils from the Frankish Avar wars. However, most such objects belong to the late Avar period, when one can no longer speak of raids to the south", or even as evidence of imitative local production. It does not support the thesis about any substantial presence of Avars or elite warriors in early medieval Croatia, the Croatian ethnonym is recorded on the territory of Avar Khaganate several centuries after its end, and that Turkic ethnic component in Croatian ethnogenesis was negligible. The Avar origin of the titles of Ban and Župan is strongly contested and is not probable due to the scarcity of Avar remains in the territory of Duchy of Croatia.

Lately, a more pro-Turkic (as White Oghurs) thesis was given by Osman Karatay. This theory is not taken into consideration by scientists because of lack of scientific approach and frequent disregard of existing historiographical scholarship. It also considered the Turkic origin of the Bosnian polity, which is viewed as an attempt of popularisation of links between Bosnian Muslims with Turkey.

== Anthropological and genetic studies ==
=== Anthropology ===
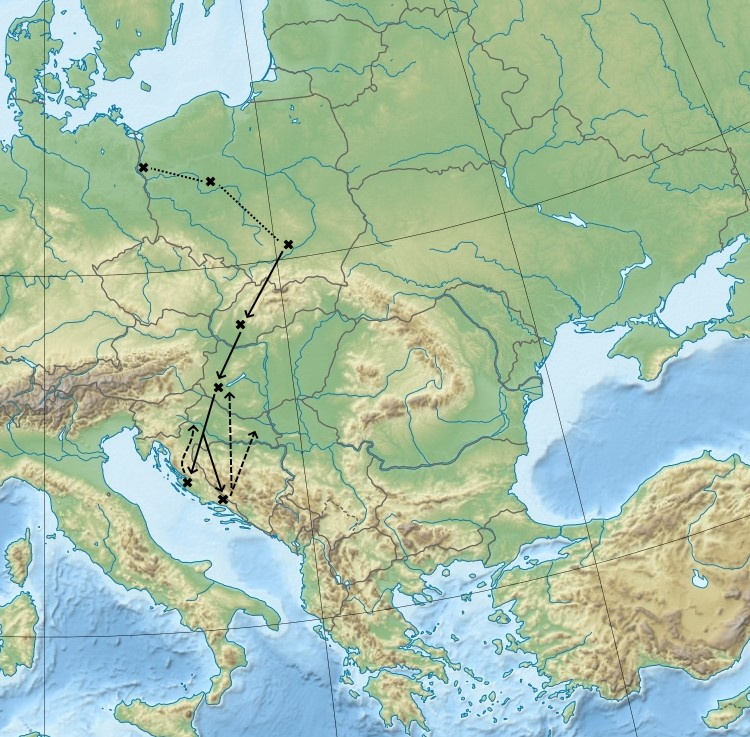
The presumed migration routes of early medieval Croats from Poland with a direct route from Lesser Poland through Slovakia and Hungary, and gradual expansion into the continental hinterland of Bosnia and Herzegovina by the 10th century, and only after the 11th century to the Northern and Eastern Croatia, per M. Šlaus (1998–2004).

Anthropologically, the craniometrical measurements made on the contemporary Croatian population of the city of Zagreb showed it predominantly has "dolichocephalic head type and the mesoprosopic face type", more specifically mesocephalia and leptoprosopia prevail in South Dalmatia, and brachycephaly and euryprosopy in Central Croatia. According to the 1998-2004 craniometric studies done by Mario Šlaus of medieval Central European archaeological sites, four Dalmatian and two Bosnian sites clustered with Polish sites, two Continental Croatia (Avaro-Slav) sites were classified into the cluster of Hungarian sites west of the Danube, while the two sites from the Bijelo Brdo culture were into the cluster of Slav sites from Austria, the Czech Republic, and Slovenia. Comparison to the Scythian-Sarmatian sites did not reveal significant similarity in cranial morphology, nor did it support the idea of the Avar frontiersmen. The results indicate that the nucleus of the early Croat state in Dalmatia was of Slavic ancestry, which arrived from the area somewhere in Lesser Poland probably along the direct route Nitra (Slovakia)-Zalaszabar (Hungary)-Nin, Croatia, and gradually expanded into the continental hinterland of Bosnia and Herzegovina by the 10th century, however, by the end of the 11th century did not in continental Northern and Eastern Croatia where were distinguished from Bijelo Brdo cultural cluster. The 2015 study of medieval skeletal remains in Šopot (14th-15th century) and Ostrovica (9th century) found out they cluster with other Dalmatian sites as well Polish sites, concluding that "PCA showed that all Eastern Adriatic coast sites were closely related in cranial morphology, and thus, most likely had similar biological makeup". According to the 2015 NASU study, medieval burial grounds in Zelenche of Ternopil Oblast and in Halych region in Western Ukraine have "anthropological peculiarities" that make them different from the nearby sites of Early Slavic tribes of Volhynians, Tivertsi and Drevlians, and closest "to several distant [medieval] populations part of the Western and Southern Slavs (Czechs, Lusatian Slavs, Moravians, and the Croatians). This fact can testify for their common origin".

The anthropological and craniometric data is in correlation with the historical sources, including an account from DAI that a part of the Dalmatian Croats split off and took rule of Pannonia and Illyricum, as well other archaeological findings which imply that early Croats did not initially settle in Lower Pannonia and that the splitting off was related to the political rule rather than ethnic origin. Others argue that the "Bijelo Brdo and Vukovar cemeteries can hardly be regarded evidence of a pre-Croatian Slavic population in northern Croatia" and they rather "represent a population fleeing the Magyars" during the 10th century".

=== Population genetics ===
Genetically, on the Y chromosome line, a majority (65%) of male Croats from Croatia belong to haplogroups I2 (39%-40%) and R1a (22%-24%), while a minority (35%) belongs to haplogroups E (10%), R1b (6%-7%), J (6%-7%), I1 (5-8%), G (2%), and others in <2% traces. The distribution, variance and frequency of the I2 and R1a subclades (>65%) among Croats are related to the medieval Slavic expansion, probably from the territory of present day Ukraine and Southeastern Poland. Genetically, on the maternal mitochondrial DNA line, a majority (>65%) of Croats from Croatia (mainland and coast) belong to three of the eleven major European mtDNA haplogroups - H (45%), U (17.8-20.8%), J (3-11%), while a large minority (>35%) belong to many other smaller haplogroups. Based on autosomal IBD survey the speakers of Serbo-Croatian language share a very high number of common ancestors dated to the migration period approximately 1,500 years ago with Poland and Romania-Bulgaria clusters among others in Eastern Europe. It was caused by the Slavic expansion, a small population which expanded into regions of "low population density beginning in the sixth century" and that it is "highly coincident with the modern distribution of Slavic languages". Other IBD and admixture studies also found even patterns of admixture events among South, East and West Slavs at the time and area of Slavic expansion, and that the shared ancestral Balto-Slavic component among South Slavs is between 55-70%.

The 2022 and 2023 archaeogenetic study published in Science and Cell confirmed that the early medieval spread of Slavic language and identity was because of large movements of people of both males and females from Eastern Europe since the late 6th and early 7th century, which "profoundly affected the region", that the Croats have more than 65% of Central-Eastern European early medieval Slavic ancestry, and Y-DNA haplogroups I2a-L621 and R1a-Z282 arrived to the Southeastern Europe with Slavic peoples as well. The 2025 Gretzinger et al. study published in Nature proved migration or settlement of the Croats in the 7th century, the qpAdm modelling revealed that 82±1% of the local pre-Slavic gene pool in medieval Croatia was replaced by Slavic ancestry, and modern Croats can be modelled as 69% Slavic and 31% of pre-Slavic local ancestry.

An 2025 autosomal PCA analysis by researchers from the Bulgarian Academy of Science and Institute for Balkan Studies, but without archaeogenetic samples and findings from Gretzinger et al. 2025, argued that 50%–60% of the ancestry of present-day Croatians derives from Slavic sources, while 20%–25% represents a pre-Slavic Balkan continuity, also suggesting that Croatian ethnogenesis possibly involved at least three distinct waves of Slavic migration between the 6th and 8th centuries CE, each reflecting the sequential integration of related but distinct Slavic groups: an early wave (6th century), documented by Gepid sources mentioning Slavs crossing at Iron Gates, an Avar-associated wave (6th–7th centuries), and a late wave (7th–8th centuries), associated with traditional Croatian migration narratives.

== See also ==
- White Croats
- White Croatia
- Genetic studies on Croats
- Names of the Croats and Croatia
- Slavic migrations to the Balkans
