= Horvati =

Horvati may refer to:

- Horvati, Brezovica, a village near the city of Zagreb, Croatia
- Horvati, Trešnjevka, a neighbourhood of Trešnjevka, Zagreb, Croatia

== See also ==
- Horvat, singular form
