= Horvatić =

Horvatić is a surname found in Croatia.

In the 2011 census, Horvatić was the eighth most common surname in the Varaždin County (esp. in Gornji Kneginec and Ljubešćica), the fifth most common name in Brckovljani, Zagreb County and the ninth most common name in Podsljeme, City of Zagreb.

Notable people with the name include:

- Dubravko Horvatić (1939–2004), Croatian novelist, poet and essayist

== See also ==
- Horvat
