= Kerubin Šegvić =

Croatian priest, writer and historian (1867–1945)

- Born: 23 February 1867; Split, Kingdom of Dalmatia, Austrian Empire
- Died: 30 June 1945 (aged 78); Zagreb, FS Croatia DF Yugoslavia
- Other name: Pierre Lucki
- Occupations: Priest, writer, politician
- Political party: Party of Rights

Kerubin Šegvić (23 February 1867 – 30 June 1945) was a Croatian priest, writer and historian.

== Biography ==
Šegvić was born in Split on 23 February 1867. Ordained as a Franciscan, he subsequently left the order but remained a priest. Šegvić was the editor of Hrvatski dnevnik published in Sarajevo in 1906. In the 1920s, he was the editor of Osijek-based Hrvatski list, as well as Hrvat and Hrvatski list published in Zagreb. In 1933, Šegvić started publication of Hrvatska smotra journal in Zagreb. He contributed to multiple newspapers and journals including the daily newspaper of the Vatican City State L'Osservatore Romano. In his 1927 work Toma Splićanin, državnik i pisac (1200.-1268.) referring to Thomas of Spalato, Šegvić examined the origin hypotheses of the Croats, advocating the so-called Gothic theory. Šegvić wrote novels Lopudska sirotica (in 1903) and Posljednji Kotromanići (in 1905) and a number of short stories, but his literary work is not deemed significant. He wrote a study on Eugen Kumičić and reviews of biographies of Eugen Kvaternik, Grgo Martić, and Ante Starčević. He signed some of his work as Pierre Lucki.

Šegvić was a politically active member of the Party of Rights. He was appointed a member (and a secretary) of the Temporary National Representation, an interim parliament established in the Kingdom of Serbs, Croats and Slovenes following proclamation of the country as a common state of the South Slavs in the aftermath of the World War One and the dissolution of Austria-Hungary. He subsequently won a parliamentary seat in the 1920 Kingdom of Serbs, Croats and Slovenes Constitutional Assembly election.

Šegvić was a part of the delegation of the Axis puppet state of the Independent State of Croatia (NDH) sent to Italy for the purpose of signing of the 1941 Treaties of Rome handing over large areas of the Adriatic Sea coast to Italy and placing parts of the NDH under Italian civilian and/or military control. During the NDH rule, Šegvić contributed to a number of newspapers and journals. After the defeat of the Axis powers, Šegvić was convicted as a collaborator with the occupation powers and executed by a firing squad in Zagreb. The charges included the accusation of disrupting Slavic unity through promotion of the theory of non-Slavic origin of Croats.

== Sources ==
- "Šegvić, Kerubin". Croatian Encyclopedia (in Croatian). Zagreb: Miroslav Krleža Institute of Lexicography.
- Švab, Mladen (1997). "Šegvić, Kerubin". In Dizdar, Zdravko; Grčić, Marko; Ravlić, Slaven; Stuparić, Darko (eds.). Tko je tko u NDH [Who Is Who in the NDH] (in Croatian). Zagreb: Minerva. ISBN 978-953-6377-03-9.
