= Arachosia =

Satrapy of the Achaemenid Empire

Harauvatiš (Old Persian) 𐏃𐎼𐎢𐎺𐎫𐎡𐏁 Arachōsíā (Ancient Greek) Ἀραχωσία
- Satrapy of Achaemenid Empire
- 530 BC–329 BC
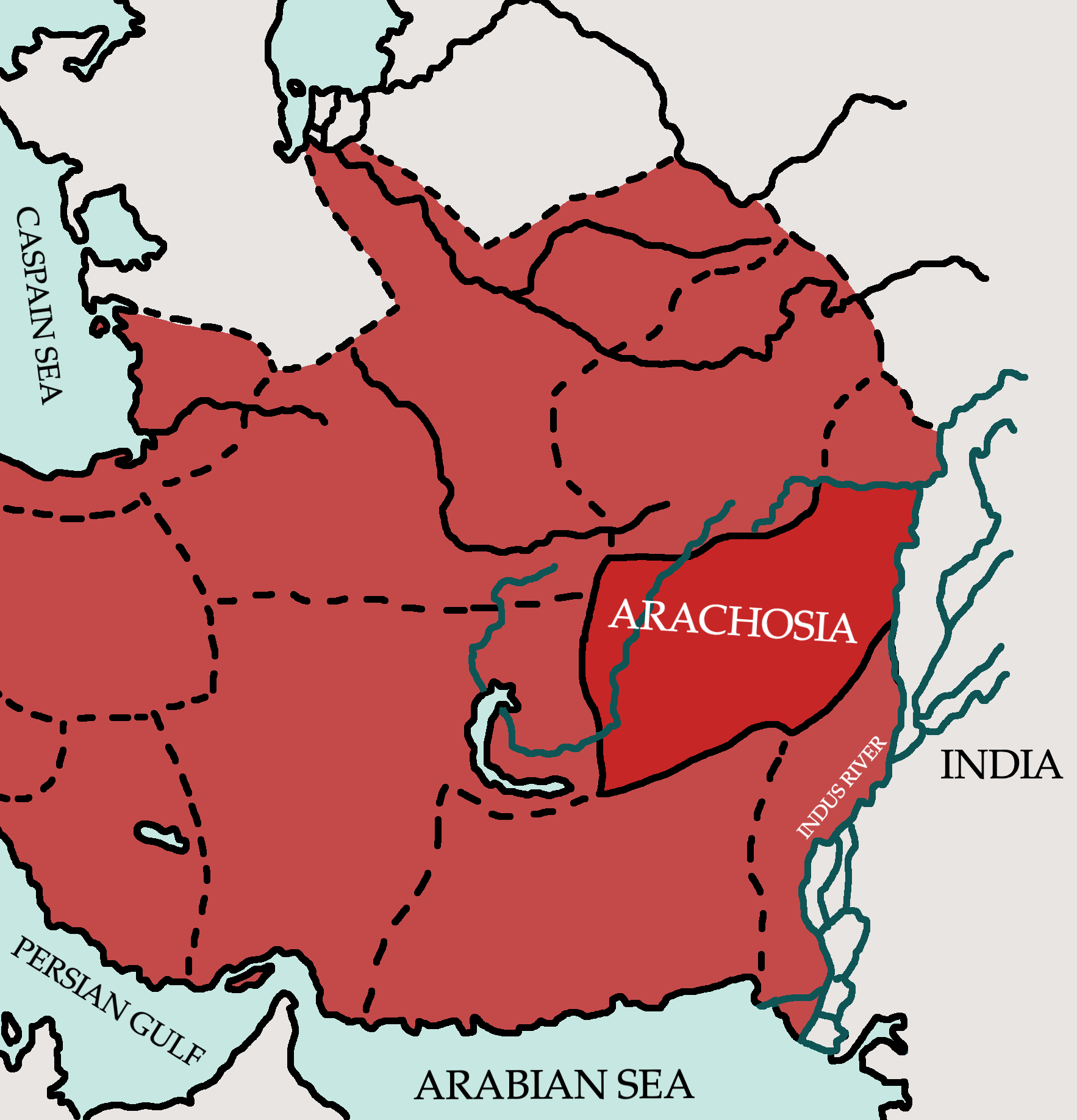
- Map of the easternmost Persian satrapies, including Arachosia
- Government
  - Type: monarchy
- King of Kings
  - 530–522 BC: Cambyses II
  - 522–522 BC: Bardiya
  - 336–330 BC: Darius III
  - 330–329 BC: Artaxerxes V Bessus (self-proclaimed)
- Historical era: Achaemenid Empire
  - Established: 530 BC
  - Dissolution: 329 BC
Succeeded by
Macedonian Empire

Arachosia (/ærəˈkoʊsiə/; Ancient Greek: Ἀραχωσία, romanized: Arachōsíā), or Harauvatiš (Old Persian: 𐏃𐎼𐎢𐎺𐎫𐎡𐏁, romanized: Harauvatiš), was a satrapy of the Achaemenid Empire. Mainly centred around the Arghandab River, a tributary of the Helmand River, it extended as far east as the Indus River. Its Persian name is the etymological equivalent of Sárasvatī in Vedic Sanskrit. In Greek, the satrapy's name was derived from Arachōtós, the Greek name for the Arghandab River. Around 330 BCE, Alexander the Great commissioned the building of Alexandria Arachosia as Arachosia's new capital city under the Macedonian Empire. It was built on top of an earlier Persian military fortress after Alexander's conquest of Persia.

== Etymology ==
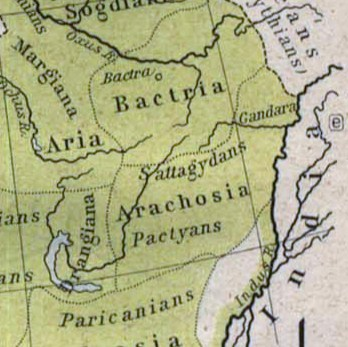
Map showing the Arachosian satrapy and the Pactyan people (500 BCE)

"Arachosia" is the Latinized form of Greek Ἀραχωσία (Arachōsíā). "The same region appears in the Avestan Vidēvdāt (1.12) under the indigenous dialect form 𐬵𐬀𐬭𐬀𐬓𐬀𐬌𐬙𐬍 Harax^{v}aitī- (whose -ax^{v}a- is typical non-Avestan)." In Old Persian inscriptions, the region is referred to as 𐏃𐎼𐎢𐎺𐎫𐎡𐏁, written h(a)-r(a)-u-v(a)-t-i. This form is the "etymological equivalent" of Vedic Sanskrit Sarasvatī-, the name of a river literally meaning "rich in waters/lakes" and derived from sáras- "lake, pond." (cf. Aredvi Sura Anahita).

"Arachosia" was named after the name of a river that runs through it. It was known in Ancient Greek as the Arachōtós and is now called the Arghandab River and is a left-bank tributary of the Helmand River.

== Geography ==
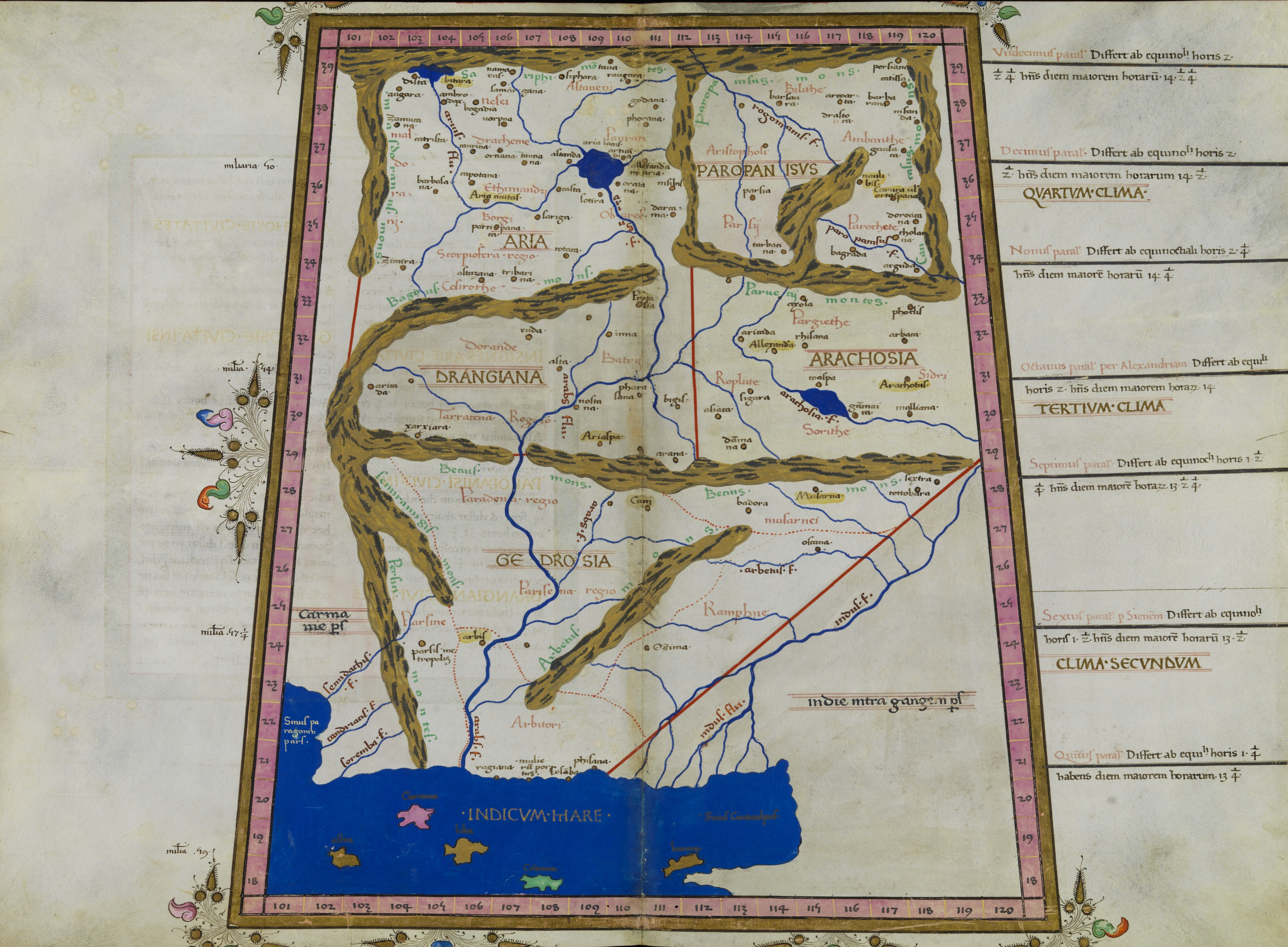
15th-century reconstruction by German cartographer Nicolaus Germanus of a 2nd-century map by Roman geographer Ptolemy, depicting Arachosia and surrounding satrapies

Arachosia bordered on Drangiana to the west, on the Paropamisadae to the north, Hindush to the east and Gedrosia to the south. Isidore and Ptolemy (6.20.4-5) each provide a list of cities in Arachosia, among them (yet another) Alexandria, which lay on the river Arachotus. This city is frequently misidentified with present-day Kandahar in Afghanistan, the name of which was thought to be derived (via "Iskanderiya") from "Alexandria", reflecting a connection to Alexander the Great's visit to the city on his campaign towards India. However, a recent discovery of an inscription on a clay tablet has provided proof that 'Kandahar' was already a city that traded actively with Persia well before Alexander's time. Isidore, Strabo (11.8.9) and Pliny (6.61) also refer to the city as "metropolis of Arachosia".

In his list, Ptolemy also refers to a city named Arachotus (English: Arachote /ˈærəkoʊt/; Greek: Ἀραχωτός) or Arachoti (according to Strabo), which was the earlier capital of the land. Pliny the Elder and Stephen of Byzantium mention that its original name was Cophen (Κωφήν). Hsuan Tsang refers to the name as Kaofu. The city is identified today with Arghandab, which lies northwest of present-day Kandahar.

== History ==
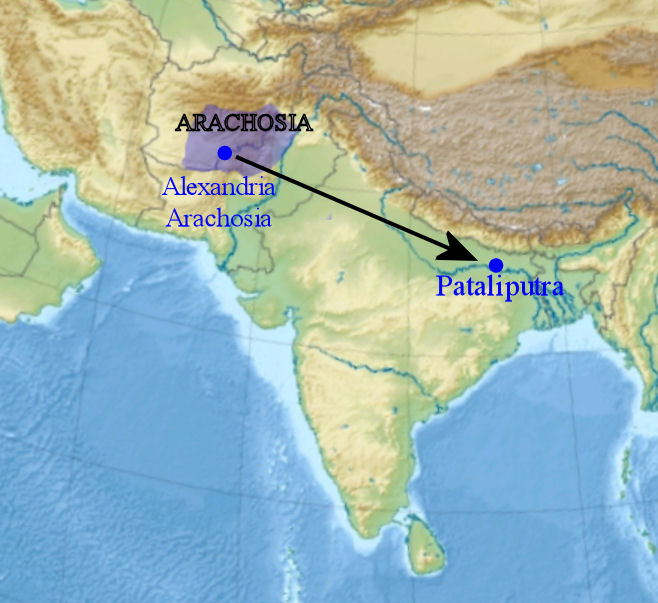
According to Roman historian Arrian, Greek explorer Megasthenes lived in Alexandropolis, from where he travelled to Pataliputra (now Patna, India) in the Mauryan Empire, to be received at the court of Chandragupta Maurya.

The region is first referred to in the Achaemenid-era Elamite Persepolis fortification tablets. It appears again in the Old Persian, Akkadian and Aramaic inscriptions of Darius I and Xerxes I among lists of subject peoples and countries. It is subsequently also identified as the source of the ivory used in Darius' palace at Susa. In the Behistun inscription (DB 3.54-76), the King recounts that a Persian was thrice defeated by the Achaemenid governor of Arachosia, Vivana, who so ensured that the province remained under Darius' control. It has been suggested that this "strategically unintelligible engagement" was ventured by the rebel because "there were close relations between Persia and Arachosia concerning the Zoroastrian faith."

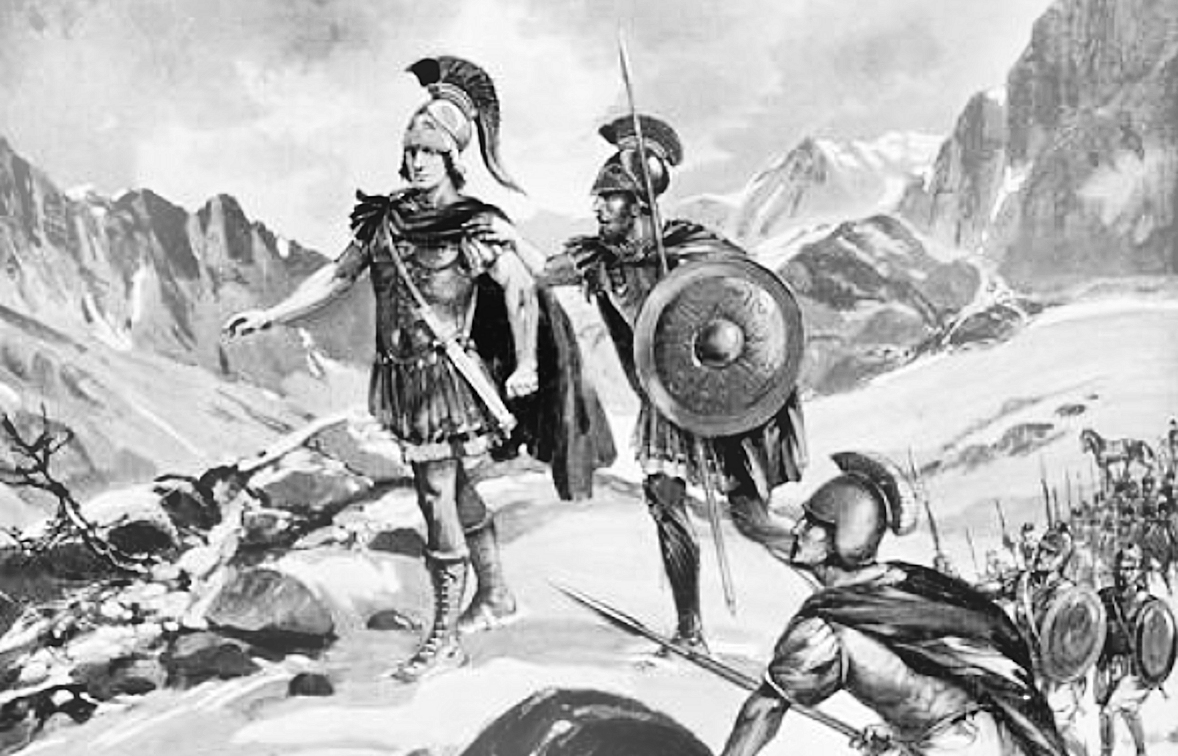
Alexander the Great with Greek troops in Arachosia (329 BCE)

The next reference to Arachosia comes from the Greeks and Romans, who record that under Darius III the Arachosians and Drangians were under the command of a governor who, together with the army of the Bactrian governor, contrived a plot of the Arachosians against Alexander (Curtius Rufus 8.13.3). Following Alexander's conquest of the Achaemenids, the Macedonian appointed his generals as governors (Arrian 3.28.1, 5.6.2; Curtius Rufus 7.3.5; Plutarch, Eumenes 19.3; Polyaenus 4.6.15; Diodorus 18.3.3; Orosius 3.23.1 3; Justin 13.4.22).

In 316 BC, Antigonus I Monophthalmus sent most of the elite Argyraspides, a veteran Macedonian corps with over forty years experience, to Arachosia to protect the eastern frontier with India. However, they were sent with the order to Sibyrtius, the Macedonian satrap of Arachosia, to dispatch them by small groups of two or three to dangerous missions so that their numbers would rapidly dwindle and remove them as a military threat to his power.

Following the Wars of the Diadochi, the region became part of the Seleucid Empire, which ceded it to the Mauryan Empire in 305 BC in return of an alliance. The Shunga dynasty overthrew the Mauryans in 185 BC, but shortly afterwards lost Arachosia to the Greco-Bactrian Kingdom. It then became part of the break-away Indo-Greek Kingdom in the mid 2nd century BCE. Indo-Scythians expelled the Indo-Greeks by the mid 1st century BCE, but lost the region to the Arsacids and Indo-Parthians. At what time (and in what form) Parthian rule over Arachosia was reestablished cannot be determined with any authenticity. From Isidore 19, it is certain that a part (perhaps only a little) of the region was under Arsacid rule in the 1st century CE, and that the Parthians called it Indikē Leukē, "White India" due to the area being ruled by the Scythian Azes Dynasty.

The Kushans captured Arachosia from the Indo-Parthians and ruled the region until around 230 AD, when they were defeated by the Sassanids, the second Persian Empire, after which the Kushans were replaced by Sassanid vassals known as the Kushanshas or Indo-Sassanids. In 420 AD the Kushanshas were driven out of present Afghanistan by the Chionites, who established the Kidarite Kingdom. The Kidarites were replaced in the 460s AD by the Hephthalites, who were defeated in 565 AD by a coalition of Persian and Turkish armies. Arachosia became part of the surviving Kushano-Hephthalite Kingdoms of Kapisa, then Kabul, before coming under attack from the Moslem Arabs. These kingdoms were at first vassals of Sassanids. Around 870 AD the Kushano-Hephthalites (aka Turkshahi Dynasty) was replaced by the Saffarids, then the Samanid Empire and Muslim Turkish Ghaznavids in the early 11th century CE.

Arab geographers referred to the region (or parts of it) as 'Arokhaj', 'Rokhaj', 'Rohkaj' or simply 'Roh'.

== Inhabitants ==
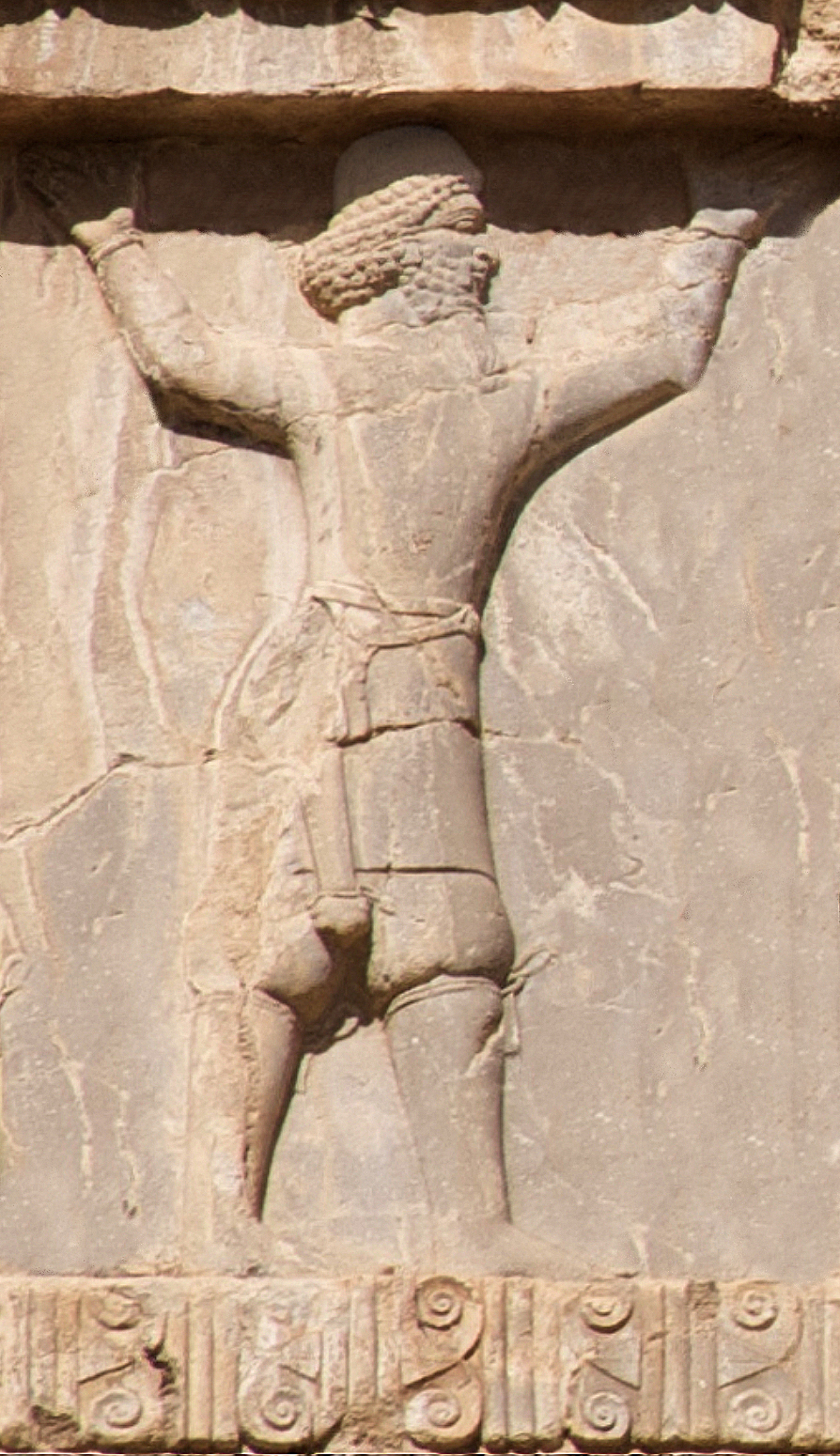
Relief at Naqsh-e Rostam, on the tomb of Xerxes I, depicting an Arachosian soldier of the Achaemenid army (c. 470 BCE)

The inhabitants of Arachosia were Iranian peoples and were referred to as Arachosians or Arachoti. They were called Pactyans in reference to their individual ethnicity, a name that may have been in reference to the ethnic group known as the Pashtuns.

Frye notes that the identification of the modern Pashtuns with the ancient Pakhtas or Pactyans mentioned by Greek historians is a mere guess and remains historically unproven.

Isidore of Charax, in his 1st-century CE "Parthian stations" itinerary, described an "Alexandropolis, the metropolis of Arachosia", which he said was still Greek even at such a late time:

"Beyond is Arachosia. And the Parthians call this White India; there are the city of Biyt and the city of Pharsana and the city of Chorochoad and the city of Demetrias; then Alexandropolis, the metropolis of Arachosia; it is Greek, and by it flows the river Arachotus. As far as this place the land is under the rule of the Parthians."

— Isidore of Charax, Parthians stations, 1st century CE. Original text in paragraph 19 of Parthian stations

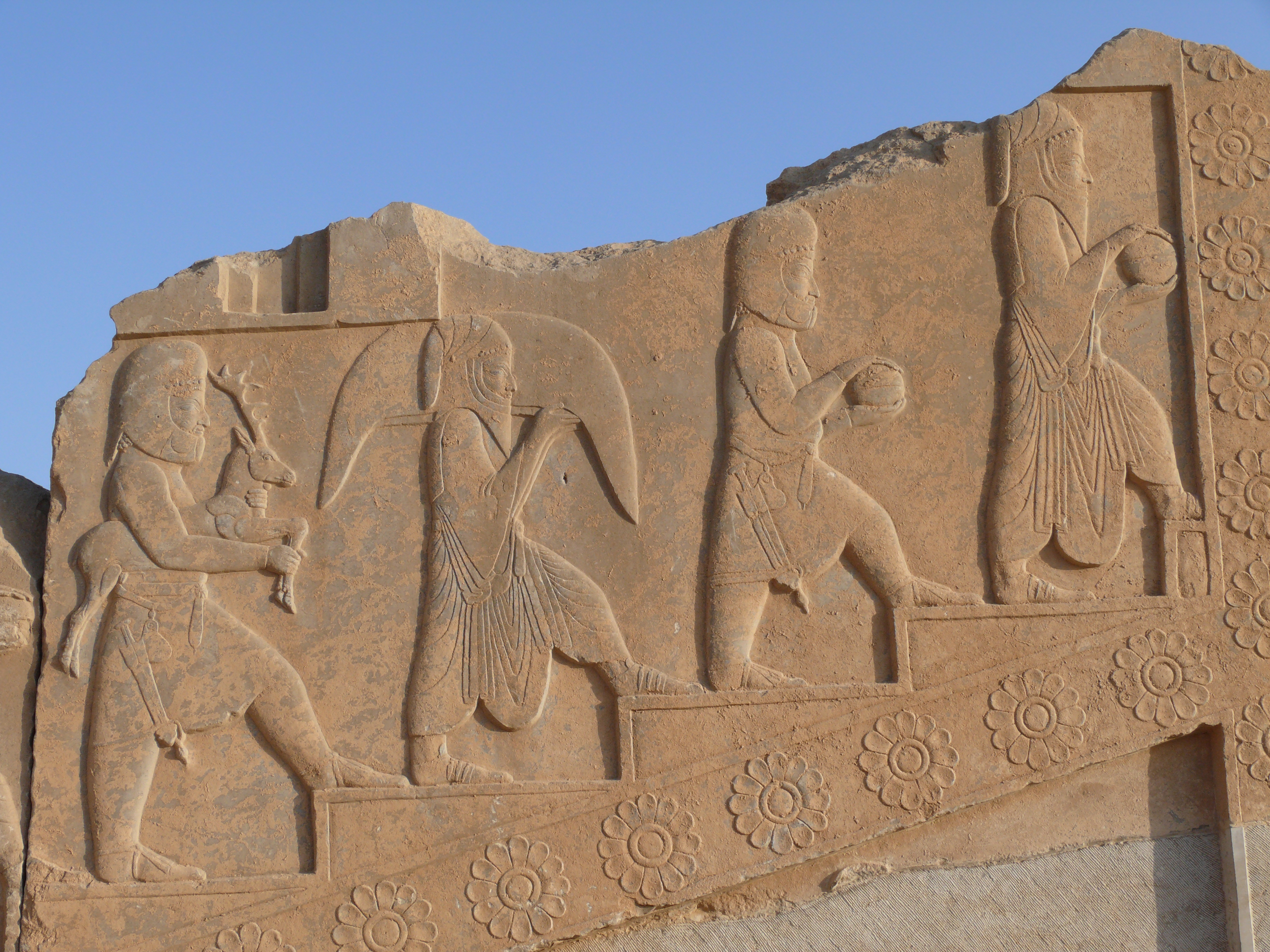
Depiction of Arachosian magi carrying various gifts and animals for ritual sacrifice at Persepolis

A theory of Croatian origin traces the origin of the Croats to the area of Arachosia. This connection was at first drawn because of the similarity of Croatian (Croatia – Croatian: Hrvatska, Croats – Croatian: Hrvati / Čakavian dialect: Harvati / Kajkavian dialect: Horvati) and Arachosian name, but other researches indicate that there are also linguistic, cultural, agrobiological and genetic ties. Since Croatia became an independent state in 1991, the Iranian theory gained more popularity, and many scientific papers and books have been published.

== See also ==
- History of Afghanistan
- Kandahar province
- Old Kandahar
