= Gregory Charvat =

American writer

Gregory L. Charvat is author of Small and Short-Range Radar Systems, Co-Founder of Butterfly Network Inc, and advisor to the Camera Culture Group at Massachusetts Institute of Technology MIT Media Lab.

== Career ==
Charvat is best known for his through-wall radar imaging system and his project-based MIT short-course on radar, where each student builds their own radar system. This radar course has been adopted by numerous other universities and institutions. Charvat is also well known in the hacker and maker community for developing radar devices and imaging systems in his garage.

Charvat grew up in the metro Detroit area, where he would take apart old televisions & radios. He built amateur radio equipment in high school, a radio telescope for which he won second place at the 1997 International Science and Engineering Fair in Louisville, KY, and developed many radar sensors in college. He earned PhD (2007), MSc (2003), and BSc (2002) degrees in electrical engineering from Michigan State University. He was a member of the technical staff at MIT Lincoln Laboratory from Sept 2007 to Nov 2011, and has taught short radar courses at MIT where his ‘Build a Small Radar Sensor...’ course was top-ranked MIT Professional Education course in 2011.

Charvat has authored or co-authored numerous journals, proceedings, magazine articles, and seminars on topics including applied electromagnetics, synthetic aperture radar (SAR), and phased array radar systems, radio frequency (RF) and analog design. He has developed numerous rail SAR imaging sensors, phased array radar systems, impulse radar systems and other radar sensors, and as well has designed his own amateur radio station. Charvat won best 2010 paper at the Military Sensing Symposia (MSS) Tri-Services Radar Symposium for his work on through wall radar. For fun he develops vacuum tube audio equipment and restores antique radios and watches, among hobbies.

Recently, Gregory Charvat provided explanations of advanced sensing technologies that the general public could understand during a series of interviews on the missing Malaysian Flight 370.

Charvat is a visiting research scientist at MIT Media Lab.

Charvat is the Series Editor of the "Modern and Practical Approaches to Electrical Engineering," book series. Author Albert Sabban published the most recent part in the series, "Low-Visibility Antennas for Communication Systems," on September 18, 2015.
