= Ivan Horvat =

Ivan Horvat may refer to:

- Ivan Horvat (nobleman) (d. 1394), Croatian name for John Horvat, nobleman in the Croatian-Hungarian kingdom
- Ivan Horvat (footballer) (1926–2012), Croatian footballer best known as Ivica Horvat
- Ivan Horvat (pole vaulter) (born 1993), Croatian pole vaulter
- Ivan Horvat (handballer) (born 1993), player for Alpla HC Hard

== See also ==
- Jovan Horvat (1713–1780), known as Ivan Khorvat, Russian general
