= Zoltán Horváth =

Zoltán Horváth is the name of:

- Zoltán Horváth (film director) (born 1966), Swiss animation film director
- Zoltán Horváth (basketball) (1979–2009), Hungarian basketball player
- Zoltán Horváth (equestrian) (born 1954), Hungarian equestrian
- Zoltán Horváth (fencer) (1937–2025), Hungarian fencer
- Zoltán Horváth (footballer, born 1989), Hungarian football player
- Zoltán Horváth (politician) (born 1974), Hungarian politician
