= Karoly Horvath =

Hungarian-American pediatrician and gastroenterologist

Karoly Horvath is a Hungarian-American pediatrician and gastroenterologist who was formerly the director of the Pediatric Gastroenterology and Nutrition Laboratory at the University of Maryland School of Medicine. He is best known for proposing a link between secretin, gastrointestinal disorders and autism and for, as a result, proposing that secretin might be an effective treatment for autism.

== Autism research ==
Horvath originally became interested in the possible link between secretin and autism after being contacted by Victoria Beck, who brought in her autistic son, Parker, to see Horvath in April 1996. After she did so, Horvath injected Parker with an intravenous dose of secretin as part of his diagnostic tests, and according to his mother, Parker's autistic symptoms improved rapidly shortly thereafter. Mrs. Beck contacted one of Horvath's colleagues, Alessio Fasano, to tell him the good news. He replied, "Mrs. Beck, I'm very happy for you, but nothing we would have done here could be responsible." Nevertheless, Mrs. Beck then became convinced that secretin was an effective autism treatment, and therefore contacted Bernard Rimland to tell him about her experience. Rimland asked a number of other parents if they could help Mrs. Beck, after which Kenneth Sokolski of the University of California, Irvine responded that, yes, he thought he could. Sokolski had become intrigued by watching videotapes of Parker seemingly showing his behavior improving greatly after receiving secretin, and persuaded a California gastroenterologist to administer some to his own son, Aaron (who had autism). Dr. Sokolski came to a similar conclusion with regard to his son as Mrs. Beck had with regard to hers, namely that while, prior to Aaron receiving secretin, "You couldn't get Aaron to look at you at all", that after just one dose, "[Aaron] looked right in the therapist's eyes."

In 1998, Horvath published a paper describing Parker, Aaron and one other child (who also had autism) in the Journal of the Association for Academic Minority Physicians. The paper stated that these three children had undergone upper gastrointestinal endoscopy with intravenous secretin administration, and that, subsequently, the children's gastrointestinal and behavioral symptoms had both improved significantly. As a result of this research, the University of Maryland (where Horvath was working at the time) filed a patent application for the use of secretin to treat autism, but ended up giving the rights to the patent to Beck, since she was the first to suspect that secretin might be an effective autism treatment. In 1999, Horvath published another study of 36 children, which concluded that "Unrecognized gastrointestinal disorders, especially reflux esophagitis and disaccharide malabsorption, may contribute to the behavioral problems of the non-verbal autistic patients." In an accompanying editorial, Pasquale Accardo and Howard Bostwick of New York Medical College wrote that Horvath's study "demonstrates consistent physiologic abnormalities (increased density of Paneth’s cells along with diminished pancreatic secretin secretion) in autism that are not known to occur in any other specific gastrointestinal disorder." That same year, researchers from the University of North Carolina, led by Adrian Sandler, published a randomized trial in which they reported that secretin was no more effective as an autism treatment than a placebo. Horvath replied, in a letter to the editor, that "It is unusual for a single dose of a drug to result in full recovery from a chronic disease", and also criticized the study for not including children with gastrointestinal symptoms. Horvath also argued that tests used to measure behavioral improvements may be unreliable when used in these trials, because "These tests were designed to diagnose autism, not to assess drug-induced changes." However, a study by researchers from the University of Chicago also concluded that secretin was not an effective autism treatment, and a total of 15 studies, performed after Sandler's study, arrived at the same conclusion. Some of these studies also used children with both autism and gastrointestinal symptoms.

== Education and career ==
Horvath attended Semmelweis University Medical School in Budapest, where he received his MD and completed his residency and fellowship. He also received a PhD from the Hungarian Scientific Academy. He left the University of Maryland some time after 1999 to join the Nemours Foundation's Alfred I. duPont Hospital for Children in Wilmington, Delaware, and to become the director of the Nemours Foundation's Children Celiac Center. He remained there until 2011, when he joined the Pediatric Gastroenterology Specialty Practice at Arnold Palmer Hospital for Children in Orlando. In addition to his research on secretin and autism, Horvath is well known for his research into, and advocacy for awareness of, celiac disease.
