= Darko Horvat =

Darko Horvat may refer to:

- Darko Horvat (footballer) (born 1973), Croatian footballer
- Darko Horvat (politician) (born 1970), Croatian politician
