= László Horváth =

László Horváth may refer to:

== Sportspeople ==
- László Horváth (footballer, born 1901), Hungarian footballer, was league top scorer with Ferencváros
- László Horváth (footballer, born 1944), Hungarian footballer, played the 1965 Inter-Cities Fairs Cup Final with Ferencváros
- László Horváth (footballer, born 1953), Hungarian footballer
- László Horváth (footballer, born 1988), Hungarian footballer
- László Horváth (modern pentathlete) (1946–2025), Hungarian pentathlete

== Others ==
- László Horváth (actor) (1943-1988), Hungarian actor, featured in Cserepek, Hungarian Rhapsody, Forbidden Relations or A járvány
- László Horváth (Hungarian politician) (born 1962)
- László Horváth (Serbian politician) (1942–2019)
