= Michal Horváth =

Michal Horváth may refer to:

- Michal Horváth (rower)
- Michal Horváth (economist)
