= Ryan Horvath =

American football player (born 1983)

Ryan Hovath
Profile
- Position: Punter

Personal information
- Born: August 4, 1983 (age 43); Overland Park, Kansas
- Listed height: 6 ft 3 in (1.91 m)
- Listed weight: 216 lb (98 kg)

Career information
- College: Drake
- NFL draft: 2006: undrafted

Career history
- New York Sentinels (2009)*
- * Offseason or practice squad member only

Awards and highlights
- 4× First-team All-PFL (2002–2005); Draddy Trophy finalist (2005)

Ryan Matthew Horvath (born August 4, 1983) is an American former football punter. He was signed by the Sentinels as a street free agent in 2009. He played college football at Drake.

== Early life ==
Horvath attended Blue Valley North High School in Overland Park, Kansas, and was a letterman in football, soccer, and golf. Horvath earned first-team Kansas Class 6A all-state honors as junior in 2000. He was a two-time first-team Eastern Kansas League and All-Sun County performer as junior and senior. Horvath owns school records for career PATs (70), career field goals (11), career punts (103), single-game field goals (three) and longest field goal (46 yards).

== College career ==
As a freshman at Drake University in 2002, Horvath earned honorable mention honors on Football Gazette NCAA Division I-AA Mid-Major All-America team. He was also a first-team All-PFL selection, while becoming first freshman ever to lead league in punting (41.0 avg.). He kicked five punts over 50 yards, including season best of 67 yards vs. Wisconsin-LaCrosse. He also had 10 coffin corner punts inside opponents 20 yard line. He averaged season best 45 yards on four punts vs. San Diego, including kicks of 57 and 51 yards. He punted season-high seven times vs. Truman State, including 61 yarder.

Horvath was named to preseason Sports Network Mid-Major All-America team in 2003 and went on to earn All-Pioneer Football League North Division first-team honors. He set school single-season record for punting yardage (2,555), while tying mark for punts in season (63). He ranked 24th in NCAA I-AA in punting with 40.56 average and ranked second in PFL. He had five punts over 50 yards, including season-long of 60 at San Diego. He also landed 17 punts inside opponents 20-yard line and ranked fourth in PFL in field goals, making eight of 13. He was selected twice as PFL special teams player of week. He earned first honor in opener at Illinois State with a career-high eight punts for 40.6 avg., including two over 50 yards, while landing three inside 20 yard line. He earned PFL honor in finale vs. Waldorf after averaging 40.6 yards on five punts, while kicking field goals of 24 and 26 yards, along with making all five PAT attempts. He kicked field goals of 32 and 34 yards vs. Dayton, while averaging 46.4 yards on five punts including long of 51. He made field goals of 22 and 24 yards at Wisconsin-Platteville and 27 yards at Valparaiso.

In 2004, Horvath earned All-Pioneer Football League North Division first team honors for third straight year. He ranked No. 32 nationally, while ranking second in PFL, in punting with 39.3 yard average. He had six punts over 50 yards, along with eight punts inside opponents 20-yard line. He averaged more than 40 yards punting in five games. He averaged season high 50.5 yards on four punts vs. Valparaiso, including school record 72-yard punt. He had 42.8 punting average on five kicks at Dayton, including long of 67 yards. He punted six times for 44.2 yard average in opener at Missouri State including long of 51 yards. He came back with 41.3 yard average on three punts vs. William Penn, including two inside the 20 yard line.

Horvath closed out his collegiate career in 2005, setting five school punting records: career punts (200), career punting yardage (8,108), single-season punts (63), single-season yardage (2,555) and single-season punting average (41.7). He was a finalist for the 2005 Draddy Trophy and earned PFL All-Academic team honors. He was a four-time first team All-PFL selection

He earned a degree in computer science, mathematics, and psychology.

== Professional career ==
After going undrafted in the 2006 NFL draft, Horvath attended camp with the Jacksonville Jaguars.

=== New York Sentinels ===
Horvath was signed by the New York Sentinels of the United Football League on August 27, 2009.
