= József Horváth =

József Horváth may refer to:

- József Horváth (footballer, born 1890) (1890-1945), Hungarian association football player
- József Horváth (equestrian) (born 1947), Hungarian Olympic equestrian
- József Horváth (handballer) (1947–2022), Hungarian Olympic handball player
- József Horváth (footballer, born 1949), Hungarian association football player
- József Horváth (chess player) (born 1964), Hungarian chess Grandmaster
- József Horváth (athlete) (born 1984), Hungarian athlete
