= Joan Horvath =

Astronomer

Joan Horvath is an American aeronautical engineer, writer, and entrepreneur. She worked at the Jet Propulsion Laboratory for sixteen years, in the technology transfer office and on the Magellan and TOPEX/Poseidon flight projects.

She was CEO of the now-defunct Takeoff Technologies, and is a cofounder of a 3D printing company, Nonscriptum LLC.

== Selected works ==
- Robinson, Laura Lovett, Joan Horvath, Jeff Cuzzi; foreword Kim Stanley (2006). Saturn : a new view. New York: Abrams. ISBN 9780810930902.
- Horvath, Joan; illustrations by Nichole Wong; foreword by Greg (2007). What scientists actually do. Corona, Calif.: Stargazer Pub. Co. ISBN 9781933277080.
