= Tamás Horváth =

Tamás Horváth may refer to:

- Tamás Horváth (chess player) (1951-2026), Hungarian chess International Master
- Tamás Horváth (footballer, born 1983), Hungarian football defender
- Tamás Horváth (footballer, born 1987), Hungarian football goalkeeper
- Tamás Horváth (footballer, born 1991), Hungarian football midfielder
- Tamas Horvath (professor), faculty member at the Yale School of Medicine
