= Přemysl Charvát =

Czech conductor

Přemysl Charvát (October 4, 1930 – November 20, 2005) was a Czech conductor from Prague. He was a graduate of the Prague Academy of Performing Arts. In his career, he directed in the National Theater, Prague State Opera and was artistic director of the Symphony Orchestra at Prague Conservatory. One of his pupils was Adolf Melichar (born 1967) who is currently with the Prague State Opera.
