= Stjepan Krizin Sakač =

Croatian historian (1890–1973)

Stjepan Krizin Sakač (10 October 1890 – 23 August 1973) was a Croatian historian, Jesuit and Catholic priest.

He was born in Kapela Kalnička. After graduating theology in Zagreb, he received his doctorate at the Pontifical Gregorian University in Rome (1915), then in Innsbruck (1920), and also in the oriental Church Sciences (1924). He was ordained as a priest in 1917. He was the first Croatian Jesuit of the Eastern Rite (which he took in 1925). He was a professor in Sarajevo, and afterwards he worked in Ukraine, Poland, Belarus and Macedonia. Since 1937 he was a professor of Slavic church history, and since 1966 an honorary professor and a spiritual director at the Pontifical Oriental Institute and a board member of the Institute of St. Jerome.

As a historian he investigated the ethnogenesis of Croats - he advocated the theory that the early Croats originated from Sarmatians and Alans, but also Old Persia. His main work is The contract of the Pope Agathon and Croats against the naval warfare in about 679 (Ugovor pape Agatona i Hrvata proti navalnom ratu oko 679; 1931).

He died in Rome in 1973.
