= Hrovat =

Hrovat is a Slovene surname. It is a variation of Horvat, which is the second most common surname in Slovenia. It is derived from the word Hrvat (archaically Horvat), which means a Croat. The surname may refer to:

- Andy Hrovat, American freestyle wrestler
- Meta Hrovat, Slovenian alpine skier
- Nathan Hrovat, Australian football player
- Urška Hrovat, Slovenian skier

== See also ==
- Hrovatin/Hrvatin (Italianized to Crevatin), a surname common in Slovenian Istria and the Slovenian Littoral
- Hrvatini, a village on the Slovenian coast
