= White Croat conquest of Dalmatia =

C. 620s–630s conquest in the Balkans

- Part of the Slavic migrations to the Balkans
Date	c. 620s-630s
Location	Dalmatia (Roman province) (present-day Croatia and Bosnia and Herzegovina)
Result	Croat victory
Territorial changes	Croats establish Duchy of Croatia and subjugate Avars

Belligerents
White Croats	Avar Khaganate

Commanders and leaders
Father of Porga (?)	Unknown

Casualties and losses
Unknown	Many killed; survivors enslaved

The White Croat conquest of Dalmatia or Croat–Avar war was a supposed early 7th century war which happened after the mass migration of White Croats from White Croatia to the Roman province of Dalmatia in present-day Croatia and Bosnia and Herzegovina. They successfully fought against the Pannonian Avars for control of the same. It resulted in the founding of the Duchy of Croatia and Croatian baptism into Christianity. This event plays an important role in the history of Croatian origin hypotheses.

== History ==
Pope Gregory I in 600 wrote to the archbishop of Salona, Maximus, in which he expresses concern about the arrival of the Slavs. According to De Administrando Imperio (DAI, 10th century), the capital city of Salona of the Roman province of Dalmatia was conquered circa 614 by the Avars and Slavs (in the DAI's chapters 29 and 30 on the history of Dalmatia and fall of Salona, the terms Avars and Slavs were interchangeably used but, most probably, generally meant the Slavs).

There are a few narratives on the arrival of Croats in the region, but the main one suggests that the Byzantine Dalmatia had been ruled by the Pannonian Avars before the arrival of White Croats. The dating of the events is stated to have been during the rule of the Byzantine emperor Heraclius (610–641), and "before the Serbs came as refugees", being commonly dated between 622 and 627, or 622–638 (or c. 630). It is considered that it coincides after failed Avar-Slav Siege of Constantinople (626), or during the Slavic uprising led by Samo against the Avars in 632, or around 635–641 when the Avars were defeated by Kubrat of the Bulgars.

=== Migration ===
It is argued that the described 7th-century homeland and migration is anachronistic based on partly available information about the contemporary 10th-century White Croats. There's a scholarly debate whether some unnamed Slavs or the Croats plundered the same province and Salona together with the Avars, and it is often considered as a date when the Croats revolted against the Avars after the Croatian migration and settlement in Dalmatia in the late 6th and early 7th century. The thesis by Bogo Grafenauer about dual migration of the South Slavs, in which the Croatian (and Serbian) would represent the second and final Slavic migratory wave dated to cca. 622/623 and unrelated to the Avar-Slavic conquest of Salona dated to cca. 614, is criticized for being unnatural and improbable.

=== Conquest ===
According to DAI 30th chapter, a group that broke off from the rest of Croats in White Croatia, was led by five brothers (Kloukas, Lobelos, Kosentzis, Mouchlo and Chrobatos) and two sisters (Touga and Bouga). This group of Croats emigrated to Dalmatia, which was ruled by the Pannonian Avars. The Croats entered into a several-year-long war against the Avars, on their own or the emperor's behalf. Byzantine influence, mentioned in the 31st chapter, on the events cannot be entirely excluded. Croats had to be strong and well-organized enough to get a new homeland by war and victory over Avars. When the Croats won and settled down, they had the father of Porga as their archon.

=== Aftermath ===
The Croats occupied Dalmatia, killing many Avars in the process and subjugating the remaining ones. However, the statement about how "there are still descendants of the Avars in Croatia, and are recognized as Avars", according to Tibor Živković "was written by the one who personally saw the Croats and the Avars still living side by side in Pannonia. This situation never occurred in Dalmatia proper, as the Avars never lived there".

== Criticism ==
The narrative of DAI on the Croatian conquest of Dalmatia received some criticism as it presented the event through a Byzantine propagandistic view, where the Croats are presented as subjects of emperor Heraclius invited to the region to deal with the Avars that previously devastated Illyricum. Also, since the 10th century, both Roman and Slavic traditions tried to explain their distant history and depict others (barbarians) or themselves (Slavs) in more positive or negative light.

Some scholars argued a constructionist late-migration theory, that the dating of the events was in the late 8th and early 9th century and related to the period of the Avar Wars with the Croats arriving as vassals of the Franks, but it received its own negative criticism as "neither the material, nor the written sources support that". Another group of scholars, including those related and influenced by processual methodological approach of the Vienna School of History and Florin Curta, showed scepticism about the historicity and ethnogenesis of the account (in accordance with their cultural model of the spread of the early Slavs, which itself received harsh criticism), and in the case of Francesco Borri proposed that it was a "literary pattern deployed by the emperor in order to explain the complex developments which brought a new elite, called Croats, to a leading position in tenth-century Dalmatia", who negates that the migration happened.
