= Porga of Croatia =

Porga
- Ruler of the Croats
- Reign: First half of the 7th century
- Predecessor: Father of Porga
- Religion: Slavic Paganism, later Christianity

Porga (Greek: Ποργά), or Porinos (Greek: Πορίνος), was an early ruler of the Duchy of Croatia during whose rule the Croats were baptized. He succeeded his father as the archon of Croats, who ruled when the Croats successfully fought the Pannonian Avars during the reign of Byzantine emperor Heraclius (610–641).

== History ==
=== De Administrando Imperio ===
According to Constantine VII's work De Administrando Imperio (mid-10th century):

- Chapter 30, 2.10, after describing the Croatian revolt and conflict against the Franks presumably dated in the mid-9th century: "From that time they remained independent and autonomous, and they requested holy baptism from Rome, so bishops were sent to baptize them in the time of their archon Πορίνος (Porinos)".
- Chapter 31, 1.3-1.4: "These same Romani were expelled by the Avars in the days of this same emperor of the Romaioi Heraclius, and their countries were left desolate. Now, by the command of the Emperor Heraclius, these same Croats fought and expelled the Avars from those parts, and, by mandate of Heraclius the emperor they settled down in that same country of the Avars, where they now dwell. These same Croats had the father of Ποργα (Porga) for their archon at that time", and, 1.5: "The Emperor Heraclius ordered and brought priests from Rome, and made of them an archbishop and a bishop and presbyters and deacons, and baptized the Croats; at that time these Croats had Porga for their archon."

=== Dates ===
According to historian Tibor Živković, the change of noble personal names, which shifted from Iranian (or another language of different origin) to Slavic, could not have happened in a mere few generations. As such, the time of the victory of the White Croats over the Avars is estimated to be during the 7th and not the 9th century. Missing the chronology, the early scholar Henry Hoyle Howorth believed that Porga was the son of one of the five brothers mentioned in chapter 30 who had left White Croatia. Živković argued that the earliest possible date of Croat arrival would have been ca. 630, the baptism had to be before 638, when Heraclius was still on good terms with the pope. However, that would mean that the Croats had two archons at the time of Heraclius, and would rule for six or seven years, which "[although] possible, it does not seem likely". Živković thinks that the Croats' baptism is connected to Constans II (r. 641–668), as an event that distinguishes the father of Porga (during Heraclius I) from Porga himself (during Heraclius Constantine r. 641 who is often identified with Constans II, as the latter at the time was also known as Heraclius Constantine).

=== Identification ===
Some historians identified Porga and Porin, others considered them as separate historical or mythological personalities, as well were - primarily Porin - presumably identified with duke Borna (r. 810–821) or Branimir (r. 879–892). In Croatian historiography, the hypothesis identifying them with Borna was mainly advanced by scholars who assumed Frankish baptism of the Croats in the 9th century. Identification of Porga and Porin with some 9th century ruler is hardly possible because "we cannot date the Christianization of the Croats after the revolt" as the Croats were already Christianized before the revolt and before both Borna's and Branimir's rule period. According to Francis Dvornik and Tibor Živković, the sentence of the 30th chapter about Porin was an insertion and "retelling the previous stories on the baptism of the Croats" during the time of Heraclius and Porga in the 7th century from the archival source used in writing of the 31st chapter of DAI.

== Etymology ==
Early scholars like Henry Hoyle Howorth believed that Porga was the son of one of the five brothers of White Croats who had left White Croatia. They noted that the name was uncommon and probably not of Slavic origin. Slovak historian Pavel Jozef Šafárik compared the name to Purgas, which was the name of a Mordvins chief mentioned in 1229. Howorth considered that the Croats were subject to "alien princes, perhaps of Avar descent". Franjo Rački considered that Porga could have been a foreign transcription of the Slavic name Borko. Vladimir Mažuranić noted that it was a genuine personal name which was attested in medieval Kingdom of Croatia at least since 12th as well Banate and Kingdom of Bosnia since 13th century in the form of Porug (Porugh de genere Boić, nobilis de Tetachich near terrae Mogorovich), Poruga, Porča, Purća / Purča, and Purđa (vir nobilis nomine Purthio quondam Streimiri). Serbian linguist Aleksandar Loma and historian Tibor Živković argued that the name comes from the Iranian phrase pouru-gâo, translated as "rich in cattle".

Recently, Croatian historian and archaeologist Ante Milošević proposed a new thesis, that the differences in names in chapters 30 and 31 of De Administrando Imperio are due to differences in the folk tradition. According to Milošević, chapter 30 resembles the tradition of the Longobards, whose first legendary rulers – Godin, Peron, and Klafon – were not actual historical figures, but deities equivalent to Norse Odin and Balto-Slavic Perun. In chapter 30, Porin – like Longobard Peron, although probably intended as Porga – wasn't an actual ruler name, but the Slavic deity Perun. Hence, Porin and Porga were two different variants of the deity Perun, and not one or two names of separate historical rulers. The thesis was subsequently supported by Denis J. Alimov, who noted that the name of 13th-century Mordvin chief Purgas derives from the deity of thunder Purgin, as well in the 10th-century Kievan Rus Perun became the supreme deity associated with the ruler.

== See also ==
- List of rulers of Croatia
