= Leontii Voitovych =

Ukrainian historian (1951–2023)

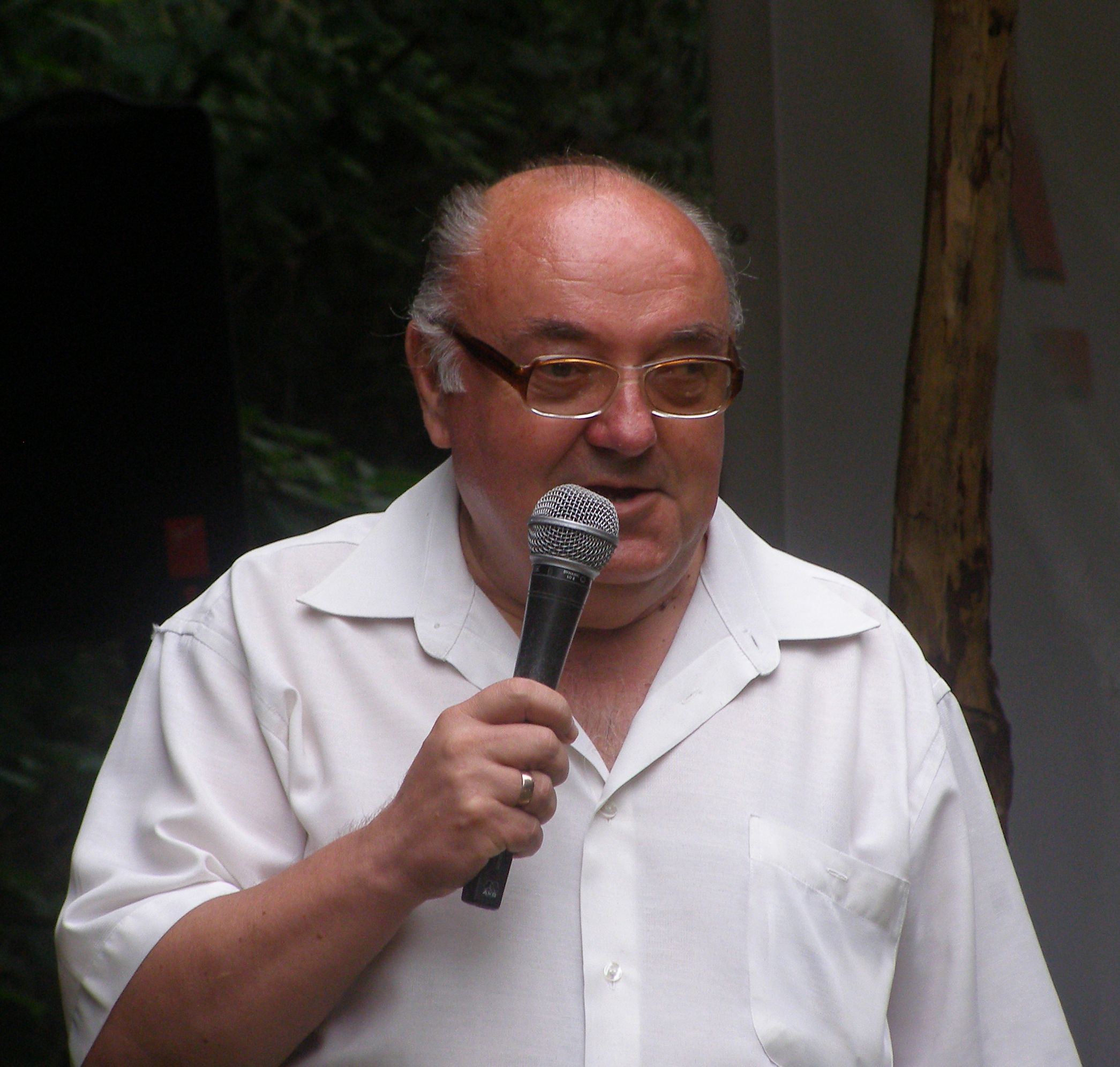
Voitovych in 2016

Leontii Viktorovich Voitovych (Ukrainian: Леонтій Вікторович Войтович; 16 May 1951 – 7 February 2023) was a Ukrainian scientist and historian who held a Doctor of Science (Ukrainian: Доктор наук) degree. He was a research fellow of the department of Middle Ages history at the Krypiakevych Institute of Ukrainian Studies (National Academy of Sciences of Ukraine) as well as an academic department director of history of Middle Ages and Byzantine studies in the University of Lviv.

== Biography ==
Born in Yemanzhelinsk, Chelyabinsk Oblast, in the Ural region of the Soviet Russia, Voitovych's family was from Western Ukraine. A brother of his grandfather, Petro Voitovych (1862–1938), was a Lviv sculptor and known for his works of Lviv Opera. His family was deported across the Ural Mountains during the Stalin period and he grew up in small mining town with many other children of Soviet exiles. His father, who graduated from Prague Polytechnic as a bridge engineer, perished in a mine from a methane explosion. Soon after Stalin's death, in 1956 Voitovych together with his mother returned to their homeland and settled in Mykolaiv, Lviv Oblast. Because in the Soviet Union Voitovych was considered to be an "unreliable element" by state authorities (i.e. a family of former exiles), he was discouraged to even try to enroll in the University of Lviv.

In 1972, he graduated from Lviv Polytechnic Institute, now Lviv Polytechnic National University, specializing in Mechanical Engineering. After graduation Voitovych worked in Berehove at a local branch of the All-Union Institute of maintenance and exploitation of vehicle-tractor park.

In 1981, he started to be involved in historical research. His supervisor was doktor of science Yaroslav Isayevych, who was a director of the department of historical landmarks of the Institute of Social Sciences (today Krypiakevych Institute of Ukrainian Studies).

In 1994, Voitovych defended his dissertation for a candidate of sciences on "Appanage duchies of Riurikids and Gediminids in 12-16th centuries". In 2001, he defended his doctorate dissertation "Princely dynasties of Eastern Europe (9–16th centuries): composition, social and political role".

Since the late 1990s, he was a professor of academic department of Ancient History of Ukraine at the University of Lviv and since 2005 Voitovych headed the academic department of Middle Ages history and Byzantine studies.

Voitovych was considered a notable historian of genealogy of Rurikids and the history of Rus' people (Ruthenians).

Voitovych died on 7 February 2023, at the age of 71.

== Recognitions ==
- 2002 – a laureate of the Hrushevsky Prize from the National Academy of Sciences of Ukraine Presidium
- 2014 – State prize in a field of science and technology (for his work on History of Ukrainian Culture in five volumes)

== Bibliography (in Ukrainian language) ==
- Генеалогія династії Рюриковичів (English title: Genealogy of Rurikid Dynasty), 1990
- Генеалогія династії Рюриковичів Гедиміновичів (English title: The genealogy Rurikids and Gediminids), 1992
- Удільні князівства Рюриковичів і Гедиміновичів у ХІІ-XVI ст. (English title: Local princes of Rurikids and Gediminids in 12th to 16th century), 1996
- Князівські династії Східної Європи (кінець IX — початок XVI ст.): суспільна і політична роль (English title: Prince Dynasties of Eastern Europe )end of the 9th to the beginning 16th century): social and political role), 2000
- Holmgard: Where did Sviatoslav Ihorevych, Volodymyr Sviatoslavych and Yaroslav Volodymyrovych Rule? / Ukrainian Historical Journal, № 3 (522), 2015. — P. 37-55.
- Галицько-волинські етюди (English title" Galicia–Volhynian Etudes), 2011
