= Aleksandar Loma =

Serbian philologist

- Born: Александар Лома; March 2, 1955; Valjevo, PR Serbia, FPR Yugoslavia
- Occupation: philologist

Aleksandar Loma (Serbian: Александар Лома; born March 2, 1955) is a Serbian philologist, Indo-Europeanist and a corresponding member of the Serbian Academy of Science and Arts since October 30, 2003.

Aleksandar Loma emphasized that Serbian epic poetry about Kosovo events is older than the events it describes, having its origin in the pre-Christian and pre-Balkan periods of Serbian history.

== Bibliography ==
- "Sloveni i Albanci do XII veka u svetlu toponomastike" [Slavs and Albanians till the 12th century in the light of the toponomastics], Stanovništvo slovenskog porijekla u Albaniji (in Serbian), Cetinje, pp. 279–327, 1990, OCLC 439986558
- Ogledna sveska, 1998, Department for etymology of Institute for Serbian language of SANU (coauthorship)
- Ljubinko Radenković, ed. (2002), Prakosovo : slovenski i indoevropski koreni srpske epike (in Serbian), Belgrade: SANU Institute of Balkanology, ISBN 9788671790338, OCLC 54098329
- Etymological dictionary of Serbian language, 2003 (coauthorship)
