= Russian dialects =

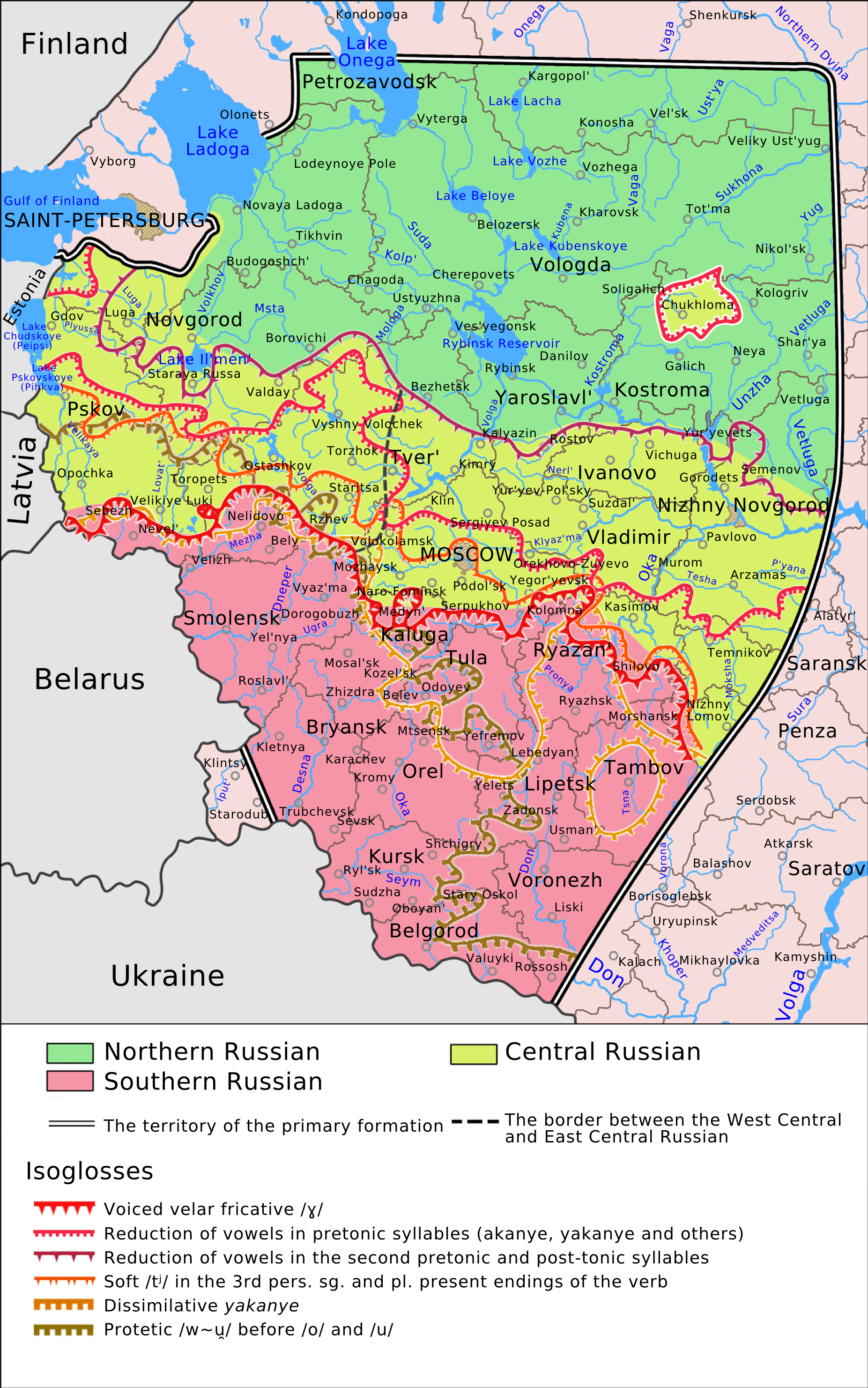
Map of the Russian dialects of the primary formation

Russian dialects are spoken variants of the Russian language.

Russian dialects and territorial varieties are divided in two conceptual chronological and geographic categories:

1. The dialects of the territory of the primary formation, which consist of "Old" Russia of the 16th century (before the Eastern conquests by Ivan the Terrible) and roughly correlate with the modern Central and Northwestern Federal districts. These "historical dialects" are claimed as ethnically Russian (Russkii).
2. The dialects of the territory of the second formation, where Russians settled after the 16th century. These new territorial varieties were produced by the Russian and Soviet expansions during the last centuries and are mainly spoken by non-Slavic, non-Slavophone, and non-Orthodox populations in post-Soviet states.

Standard Russian, based on the Moscow dialect, is now used throughout Russia. However, traditional dialects may still be heard among rural population, in particular of older generations. Some people speak language varieties intermediate between standard Russian and traditional dialects; such varieties are called prostorechiye (Russian: просторечие). Prostorechiye is characterized by usage of certain phonetic, grammatical, and lexical features which are considered nonstandard in speech which would otherwise be standard Russian. The use of prostorechiye is highly stigmatized as a sign of uneducatedness. Even within standard Russian, certain regional variants may be distinguished; see differences between speech of Moscow and St. Petersburg residents in the Russian Wikipedia.

== In Russia ==
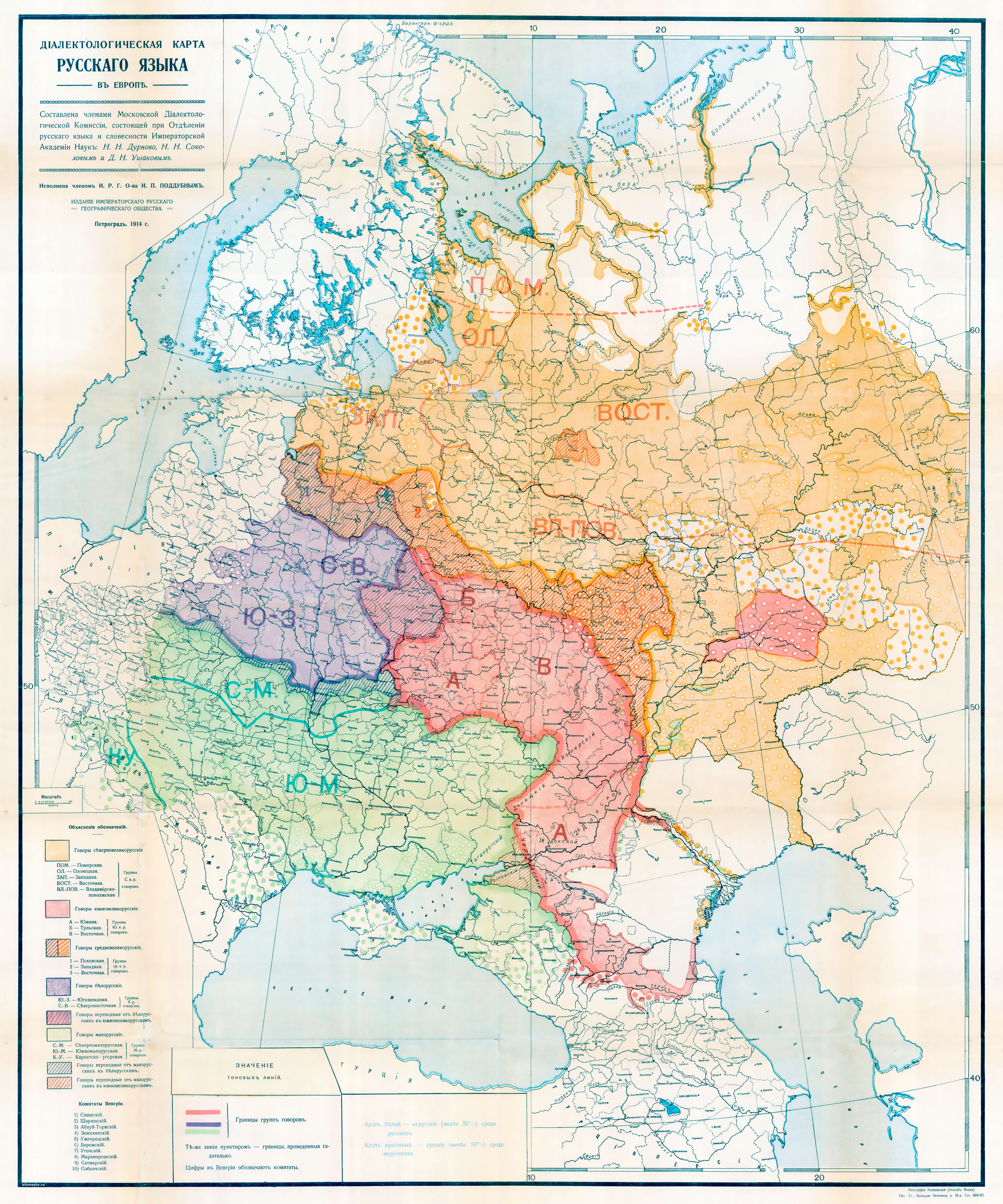
Dialect distribution areas. Pre-revolutionary dialectological map of 1914

Depending on the presence or the absence of vowel reduction (akanye and/or ikanye) and the pronunciation of Proto-Slavic *g, Russian is divided into two main dialectical divisions and the intermediate one:

- Northern, in the northern and north-eastern parts of European Russia, from Veliky Novgorod to the Perm and northern Ural regions; this has no or little vowel reduction in unstressed positions and stop /ɡ/.
- Southern, in the western and southern parts of European Russia; this has various types of vowel reduction and fricative /ɣ/; this group makes up a dialect continuum with Belarusian, although it differs significantly from the Ukrainian dialects to the further south, sharing only a few isoglosses (namely the fricative pronunciation of Proto-Slavic *g). This is due to the fact that the Russian-Ukrainian linguistic boundary has only existed since the expansion of both of these languages into the steppes, at which time they were already markedly different.
- Central or Middle is in an intermediate position between the above two, stretching from Pskov to Tver, Moscow, Nizhny Novgorod, and down to the Lower Volga region; this group is very heterogeneous and consists of dialects both with and without vowel reduction and either /ɡ/ or /ɣ/. The Muscovite dialect forms the basis of Standard Russian: being originally a northern dialect, with /ɡ/ and no reduction, it later came under the southern influence and has adopted vowel reduction, but retained /ɡ/.

The dialects of the southern Ural, Siberia and the Far East may be of all three groups, depending on where the settlers from European Russia came from. The dialects of the Lower Don and the Northern Caucasus are of the Southern Russian origin.

=== Dialects within Russia ===
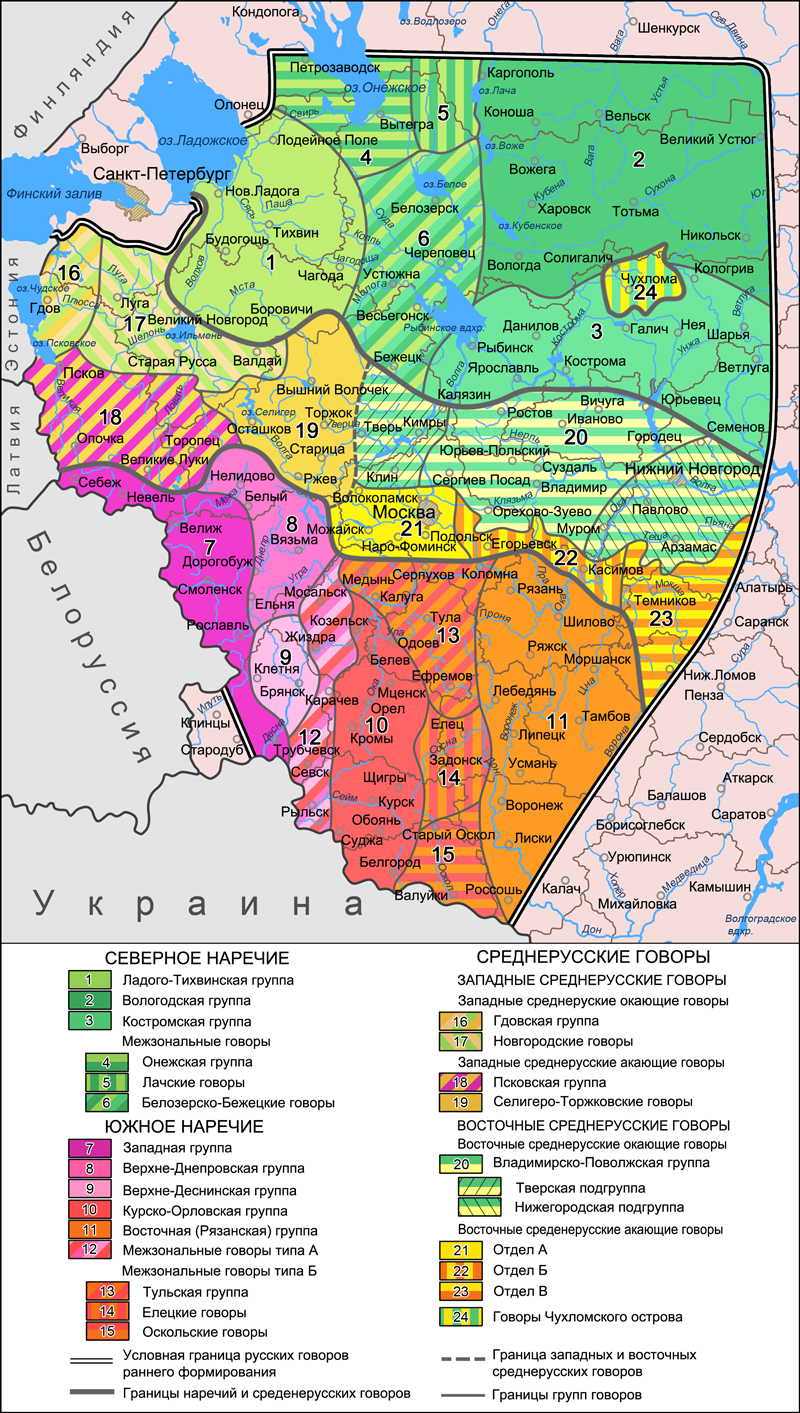
Map of the Russian dialects (in Russian)

==== Northern Russian dialects ====
- Kostroma-Yaroslavl
- Ladoga-Tikhvin
- Transitional groups: Onega, Lacha, Belozersk-Bezhetsk
- Pomor (Arkhangelsk and Murmansk)
- Siberian
- Vologda

==== Central or Middle Russian ====
- Western

- Groups with okanye (Gdov, Luga, Novgorod, Staraya Russa, Valday)
- Groups with akanye (Pskov, Velikiye Luki, Toropets, Rzhev, Torzhok)

- Eastern

- Groups with okanye (Tver, Klin, Sergiev Posad, Vladimir, Suzdal, Rostov, Yaroslavl Oblast , Ivanovo, Murom, Nizhny Novgorod)
- Groups with akanye (Moscow, Kasimov, Temnikov)

- Chukhloma enclave (with akanye)

===== Bashkort Russian =====
Bashkort Russian is characterised by the adoption of native Bashkir and Tatar words such as айда replacing давай to mean "let's go". It is primarily spoken in the Republic of Bashkortostan, which is an autonomous region of Russia.

===== Lake Peipus =====
Lake Peipus dialect (Russian: Причудский говор) is a Russian language variety spoken on both sides of Lake Peipus in Pskov Oblast, Russia and some counties of Estonia where Russian is a frequently-spoken or dominant language. It originated as a mix of Pskov and Gdov dialects of the Central Russian cluster. As many other dialects from this area, it is often considered to be transitional between Russian and Belarusian. Lake Peipus dialects also include some loanwords from the Estonian language.

The dialect has been studied and described by Olga Rovnova of the University of Tartu who has conducted fieldwork in Russian Old Believers' communities in Estonia.

==== Southern Russian dialects ====
- Western (Bryansk, Smolensk, southern parts of Pskov and Tver)
- Transitional group A (Mosalsk, Kozelsk, Zhizdra, Karachev, Sevsk, Rylsk)
- Central (Belgorod, Kursk, Oryol)
- Transitional group B (Serpukhov, Kolomna, Kaluga, Tula, Elets, Stary Oskol)
- Eastern (Lipetsk, Tambov, Ryazan, Voronezh).

===== Astrakhani Russian =====
Astrakhani Russian is a collection of varieties of Russian spoken in Astrakhan Oblast, predominantly by the ethnically mixed population—ethnic Russians (61%), Kazakhs (17%), Tatars (7%) among the main speakers, and include many other groups such as Azeris, "Dagestani" (by self-identification according to the 2010 census), Nogay, and Ukrainians.

Like Dagestani Russian, Astrakhan Russian refers to many different dialects varying depending on a speaker's native language, ethnicity, age, occupation, and other social factors. Even in the metropolitan area of Astrakhan where a person of a minority background is likely to grow up speaking only Russian, traces of their heritage language are still present.

===== Cossack Russian =====
====== Balachka ======
Balachka is spoken in the Kuban region of Russia, by the Kuban Cossacks. The Kuban Cossacks being descendants of the Zaporozhian Cossacks are beginning to consider themselves as a separate ethnic identity. Their dialect is based on the Middle Dnieprian dialect of the Ukrainian language. Balachka includes dialectical words of central Ukrainian with frequent inclusion of Russian vocabulary, in particular for modern concepts and items. It varies somewhat from one area to another.

=== Isoglosses ===
Isogloss	Northern Russian	Standard Russian	Southern Russian
Unstressed /o/	[o]	[ɐ~ə]	[a~ɐ~ə~ɨ]
Unstressed /e/, /a/, /o/ after palatalized consonants	[ɪ], [e]	[ɪ]	[æ] (pre-stressed), [ɪ]
/ɡ/	[ɡ]	[ɡ]	[ɣ]
/v/	[v]	[v]	[w~u̯]
/f/	[f]	[f]	[x~xv~xw]
Present 3 p. sg. & pl. final	/t/	/t/	/tʲ/
Final /l/	/l/	/l/	/w~u/
Past sg. masc. final	/v/ (Note: In the dialect of Vologda)	/l/	/l/
Prothetic /v~w/	no	no (Note: Except for восемь ('eight') and some other words)	yes
Hardening of final soft labials	no	no	yes

== Eastern Europe ==
=== Moldovan Russian ===
Moldovan Russian is characterised by differences in orthography, with the use of Молдова (Moldova) instead of Молдавия (Moldavia) or Кишинэу (Chișinău) instead of Кишинёв in government and media of Moldova. It is also characterized by Romanian loanwords. This change is also widely accepted by Russian-language media inside of Russia, as well. Russian is more often used as a second language and as the language of interethnic communication than as a first language in the country, which contributes to influence from the state language, Romanian.

=== Ukrainian Russian ===
The Russian language in Ukraine has influence from the Ukrainian language in grammar, vocabulary and pronunciation. When Ukrainians speak Russian, the Russian letter Г (G) is mostly pronounced as /ɦ/, like in Ukrainian, instead of /g/. There are also clear differences in the intonation. Additionally, a mixture of Ukrainian and Russian (the so called surzhyk), is also spoken by many Ukrainians.

== Caucasus ==
=== Abkhaz Russian ===
Abkhaz Russian is characterised by the use of Abkhaz terms, orthographical differences, and patterns of speech that diverge from that of Standard Russian.

=== Chechen Russian ===
Notable variety features include use of /u/ <у> in place of /v/ <в>, such as in <привет>, pronounced /priuet/ [приуэт]. Additionally, дон is used as a filler word, similar to ну or короче in standard Russian.

=== Dagestani Russian ===
Dagestani Russian (Russian: Дагестанский русский) is a regional variety of the Russian language spoken in Dagestan, a constituent republic of the Russian Federation, and some of the neighboring regions including Astrakhan Oblast and Kalmykia. It is characterized by heavy influence from vernacular languages, mostly those belonging to the Northeast Caucasian and Turkic language families. It is considered a low prestige language and mostly used in informal domains. By some measures, it is considered an ethnolect.

=== Armenian Russian ===
Armenian Russian is the regional variety of Russian spoken in Armenia and the partially-recognised Republic of Artsakh (as Artsakhi (Armenian) Russian), where parliament voted to establish Russian an official language in March 2021.

== Central Asia ==
=== Kazakh Russian ===
Most key word differences come in the form of toponyms of renamed cities after the 1991 independence of Kazakhstan. Not all renamings are manifested in the Russian language, such as with the city of Almaty, still known by its former name of Alma-Ata in Russian, because they sound similar. Other differences include names for authorities such as мажилис, мажилисмен which substitute the Russian word депутат. Акимат is a localised Russian construction of the borrowed word Аким, meaning "mayor", and given the traditional -ат suffix in standard Russian that is used for words such as секретариат and ректорат. Kazakh Russian is often classified as being influenced strongly by Kazakh and the use of Kazakh words.

=== Kyrgyz Russian ===
Kyrgyz Russian is characterised by phonetic differences as well as the use of some words from the Kyrgyz language. There are also some other differences in vocabulary, such as сотка (sotka) replacing the standard мобильник (mobil'nik) meaning "mobile phone".

=== Tajik Russian ===
The varieties of Russian spoken in Tajikistan are collectively referred to as "Tajikistani Russian" or "Tajik Russian". Both Russian and Tajik are recognised as official languages according to the Constitution of Tajikistan, and their usages often influence each other. Both languages are written in the Cyrillic script.

==== Lexicon ====
Tajik words and expressions are often found in the colloquial speech of Tajik Russian speakers, especially in Dushanbe, although qualitatively, Russian borrowings into Tajik exceed the reverse. The varieties are greatly affected by Russian-speaking families, intermarriages between different nationalities, Russian-language classrooms, and location.

Tajik lexical units have entered the Tajik Russian dialect. For example, the words душман 'mujahid, enemy' and духан 'tavern, shop' entered Russian through Tajik during the Soviet–Afghan War.

The colloquial lexicon also includes words such as: алча (alcha), дастархан (dastarkhan), джигит (dzhigit), казан (kazan), кайф (kayf), карбос (karbos), кишмиш (kishmish), гашиш (gashish), топчан (topchan), чинара (chinara).

There are also words used in science, literature and academia, such as бейт (beyt), дастан (dastan), and изафет (izafet).

Exoticisms include манту (mantu), курпача (kurpacha), плов (plov), танур (tanur), хоуз (khouz), див (div), дутор (dutor), най (nay, самбуса (sambusa), чапан (chapan), and эзоры (ezory).

Both Russian and Tajik speakers are served by the following words to address unfamiliar people and acquaintances.

Words of familial relation
Tajikistani Russian	Standard Russian	English translation
апа	старшая сестра	'older sister'
ака	старший брат	'older brother'
хола	тётя	'aunt'
янга	жена брата, невестка	'daughter-in-law; sister-in-law'

Calques are not very numerous and are often used with a humorous undertone. For example, хунуковато (from Tajik хунук meaning 'cold') in place of standard Russian холодновато.

There are also words used by Tajiki Russian speakers that have long had their own standard Russian equivalents:

Nonstandard words in Tajik Russian
Tajikistani Russian	Standard Russian	English translation
зира	тмин	'carum'
испанд	рута	'ruta'
каймак	сметана	'smetana'
халтак	мешочек, кисет	'sack'
чакка	кислое молоко	'fermented milk'

Tajik expressions are often used: хайрият in lieu of к счастью for 'fortunately', наконец-то (досл. добро) for 'finally', and тавба in place of досл. раскаяние for 'remorse'.

In youth jargon, Russian affixes and endings are attached to Tajik stems, or a Tajik noun is paired with a Russian verb in a phrase. For example: гапы бросать instead of разговаривать for 'to converse' (from Tajik гап 'speech, conversation').

After the end of the Soviet period, many Russian words were given Tajik equivalents. For example, «велосипед» — «дучарха» for 'bicycle', «команда» — «даста» 'team', «фронт» — «джабха» for 'front', «ракета» — «мушак» for 'rocket'.

Mixed speech also includes common Russian substitutions and additions either alongside or in place of other Tajik words such as обычный or простой instead of одати; морожени instead of яхмос; туалет instead of мабраз; and серьёзный instead of джидди.

==== Grammar ====
A very noticeable feature of Tajik Russian is the usage of Tajik auxiliary verbs кардан ('to do') and доштан ('to have, to possess') in mixed speech. For example: ждать доштан; успеть кардан instead of расида тавонистан; договориться кардан instead of мувофикат хосил кардан; завтракать кардан instead of ноништа кардан. Additionally, утюг кардан ('to iron') (Standard Russian]l: гладить); телефон кардан ('to call (someone)') (Standard Russian: звонить); уборка кардан ('to clean') (Standard Russian: убирать).

Calques are also a very frequent domain in the usage of Tajik Russian:

- The suffix -чи which creates nouns denoting the doers of an action, a name of a profession, or a person by their characteristics. For example: колхозчи to mean колхозник ('collective farmer') in Standard Russian; тракторчи instead of тракторист to mean 'tractor driver'. Others include: таксичи/таксистчи instead of таксист; and автомобилчи instead of автомобилист.
- The suffix -дор, which creates a noun denoting an object possessing something or some quality. For example: камерадор meaning 'possessing a camera' in reference to a mobile telephone. In other varieties of Russian such as Kyrgyz Russian, the word сотка is used for a mobile phone whereas мобильник and мобильный телефон are used more in Russia proper.

==== Phonology ====
Colloquial speech has retained almost all Russian borrowed elements (with the exception of words of purely Soviet semantics). Most borrowings, especially colloquial ones, change their phonetics and acquire a sound that is more suitable for the Tajik ear.

In most cases, this means, first of all,

A change of stress:

- картошка;
- майка
- лето

Loss of the soft sign (ь):

- апрел;
- контрол
- сел (цель)

Change of the sound "ц" to the sound "с":

- сирк (цирк)
- консерт (концерт)
- сел (цель)

Frequent replacement of the sound "А" with the sound "О":

- мошин (машина)

The reduction of sound "Ы" for the sound "И":

- вибор (выбор)
- вибить (выбить)
- виезд (выезд)
- пил (пыль)

Disappearance of the ending to zero:

- газет (газета)
- зибр (зебра)
- конфет (конфета)
- книг (книга)
- слов (слово)

Nevertheless, a number of words remain unchanged: март, газета.

=== Uzbek Russian ===
There are words commonly used in Uzbek Russian not frequently used in that of Russia: вилоят, лаган, хурджук, хоким, юзбоши, атола, казы, димляма.

Various mixed phrases include: мен хорошийман, девушкахон, Иван-ака, закяз-самса.

== Other ==
=== Alaskan ===
Kodiak Russian and Ninilchik Russian, together known as Alaskan Russian, are two isolated dialects of Russian spoken in Alaska.

=== Israeli ===
The Russian language in Israel, spoken by Russian repatriates, differs from the Russian language in Russia. Differences range from individual words (such as «йом ришон», "yom rishon", instead of «воскресенье» for Sunday; «матнас», matnas instead of «клуб» for club) and expressions (such as «брать автобус», "take a bus", instead of «ехать на автобусе», "go by bus"; «делать армию», "make an army" or "do army", instead of «служить в армии», "serve in the army"), to phonetics and phraseology. This variant is called by Israelis and scholars "Rusit"/"Русит", from the Hebrew name of the Russian language.

== Vocabulary ==
Russian dialects usually preserve many archaic words and forms which dropped out of use or were replaced with Church Slavonic counterparts. In North Russian there are about 200 words of Uralic origin.

== Text corpora of Russian dialects ==
- Ustja River Basin Corpus
- Corpus of Rogovatka dialect
- Corpus of Spiridonova Buda dialect
- Corpus of Malinino dialect
- Opochka Dialect Corpus
