= Siberian dialects =

Group of Northern Russian dialects

Siberian
- Siberiak
- сибирской говор sibirskoy govor
- Native to: Russian Federation
- Region: Siberia
- Language family: Indo-European: Balto-Slavic; Slavic; East Slavic; Russian; Northern Russian; Siberian
- Writing system: Cyrillic

Language codes
- ISO 639-3: –
- Glottolog: None

Siberian dialects (Russian: сибирские говоры, romanized: sibirskiye govory) are a group of Northern Russian dialects under the lexical influence of the Southern Russian dialects and foreign inclusions (primarily Turkic and sometimes Uralic). It has been spoken by Siberian old settlers: Siberiaks, Chaldons, Cossacks, Pokhodchans (Kolymchans), Russian Ustians (Indigirshchiks), and Markovites (Anadyrshchiks).

From a phonetic and grammatical point of view, Siberian dialects genetically go back to Northern Russian dialects (such as Vologda and Veliky Ustyug dialects) and are characterized by okanye, clear pronunciation of vowels, plosive /g/, absence of /ɕː/ (replaced by long /ʂː/), dropping out vowels (which leads to changes in the adjective declension) and consonants, a variety of pluperfect forms, as well as frequent use of postpositive articles,, whose forms depend on the word's gender, number and declension ('мужик-от', 'самосад-отто', 'баба-та', 'руку-ту', 'сусиди-те').

Research notes the development of a written Siberian language that is gradually spreading among Siberians.

== Phonology ==
- /g/ and /k/ alternation;
- /f/ inclusion (еслиф, ислиф);
- Long /ʂː/ and /ʐː/ (шшука, дожжык);
- Differentation between /t͡s/ and /t͡ʃ/;
- The /st/ and /sʲtʲ/ endings are simplified to /s/ and /sʲ/;
- Vowel contraction (красна девка играт).

== Morphology ==
- Feminine genitive ends with -ы;
- Feminine dative and propositional ends with -е (в грязе);
- Masculine propositional has the same ending as instrumental (в баским доме);
- The чо interrogative pronoun;
- 3rd person verbal ending with non-palatalized -t as in Standard Russian;
- 1st and 2nd verbal conjugation endings are not differentiated in 3rd person plural. Both conjugations utilize –ут/–ют.

== Vocabulary ==
Siberian dialects are characterized by a number of words like шибко ('very'), баской ('beautiful'), дородно ('good'), айда ('let's go'), айдать ('to go', rare), исти ('to eat'), толмачить ('to translate'), вольготно ('freely'), таперича ('now'), робить ('to work'), мультифора ('page protector'), вехотка or рехотка ('bath sponge'), вершить ('to solve'), хорош ('enough'), швыркать ('to drink'), вошкаться ('to fuss'). There are also numerous loanwords of Uralic and Turkic origin. Most of the dialecticisms have died out, though most of the listed words are still present in modern speech in Siberia.

== Literature ==
- Блинова О. И. «О термине „старожильческий говор Сибири“» // «Вопросы языкознания и сибирской диалектологии», Томск, 1971. Вып. 2., с. 3-8.
- Копылова К. А., Садретдинова Г. А. «Краткий отчет о диалектологической экспедиции в Тарский район Омской области» // «Вопросы структуры и функционирования русского языка», Томск, 1979., с. 125—130.
- Садретдинова Г. А. «О типе и диалектной основе тарских говоров» // «Вопросы структуры и функционирования русского языка», Томск, 1984. Вып. 5., с. 153—158.
- Садретдинова Г. А. «История заселения русскими Западной Сибири в связи с изучением сибирских старожильческих говоров» // Диалектологические и историко-лингвистические проблемы. Омск, 1999. С. 70-85.
- «Словарь русских старожильческих говоров средней части бассейна р. Оби» / Под ред. В. В. Палагиной. Томск, 1964. Т. 1
- «Словарь русских старожильческих говоров средней части бассейна р. Оби» / Под ред. В. В. Палагиной. Томск, 1965. Т. 2
- «Словарь русских старожильческих говоров средней части бассейна р. Оби» / Под ред. В. В. Палагиной. Томск, 1967. Т. 3
- «Словарь русских старожильческих говоров средней части бассейна р. Оби» (дополнение) / Под ред. О. И. Блиновой и В. В. Палагиной, Томск, 1983. Ч. 1. (и след.)
- Бухарева Н. Т., Федоров А. И. «Словарь фразеологизмов и иных устойчивых сочетаний русских говоров Сибири», Новосибирск, 1972.
- «Словарь русских старожильческих говоров Среднего Прииртышья» Т. 1-3./ Под редакцией Г. А. Садретдиновой., Томск, 1993.
- «Словарь русских старожильческих говоров Среднего Прииртышья». Дополнения / Ответственный редактор Б. И. Осипов. Вып. 1 (и след.)
- «Полный словарь сибирского говора», Том I—IV. Томск, 1992—1995
- «Словарь говоров старообрядцев (семейских) Забайкалья», Новосибирск, 1999
- «Словарь русского камчатского наречия», Хабаровск, 1977
- «Словарь русской народно-диалектной речи в Сибири XVII — первой половины XVIII в.» / Сост. Л. Г. Панин. Новосибирск, 1991
- Браславец К. М. «Диалектологический очерк Камчатки», Южно-Сахалинск, 1968
- Зотов Г. В. «Русский старожильческий говор Среднеколымска», в: «Вопросы теории русского языка и диалектологии», с. 184—216
- Зотов Г. В. Словарь региональной лексики Крайнего Северо-Востока России /под ред. А. А. Соколянского. Магадан, 2010
- Клепицкая Н. А., Ячинская Д. А. «Морфологический очерк имени существительного в амурских старожильческих говорах», в: «Вопросы теории русского языка и диалектологии», с. 113—133
- «Словарь фразеологизмов и иных устойчивых словосочетаний русских говоров Сибири», Новосибирск: Наука, 1972
- Богораз В. «Областной словарь Колымского русского наречия», СПб., 1901
- «Словарь русских говоров Новосибирской области» / Под редакцией А. И. Фёдорова. Новосибирск, 1979
- Крайний Северо-Восток в зеркале региональной лингвистики / под ред. А. А. Соколянского. Магадан, 2008
- Региональная лингвистика (Крайний Северо-Восток России) /под ред. А. А. Соколянского : учебное пособие. Магадан, 2016
- Элиасов Л. Е. «Словарь русских говоров Забайкалья», М., 1980
- Фразеологический словарь русских говоров Сибири / Под редакцией А. И. Фёдорова. Новосибирск, 1983
- Научные труды Романовой М. А. по говорам Сибири
- Словарь образных единиц сибирского говора / [авт.-сост. О. И. Блинова, М. А. Толстова, Е. А. Юрина]; под ред. О. И. Блиновой; Том. гос. ун-т. - Томск : Издательство Томского университета, 2014.
- Словарь синонимов сибирского говора / [авт.-сост.: О. И. Блинова, М. Э. Гавар, М. А. Толстова; под ред. О. И. Блиновой]; Науч. исслед. Том. гос. ун-т. - Томск : Издательство Томского университета, 2016.
- Аникин А. Е. «О лингвогеографическом аспекте изучения русской сибирской лексики» // Этимология 1985, М., 1988.
- Аникин А. Е. «Три пути русских за Урал: свидетельства языка» // сибирский филологический журнал. Новосибирск, 2007. №1.
- Фёдоров А. И. «Словарь русских говоров Сибири», Новосибирск, 1999.
- Васильев В. П. Лингвистическая характеристика старожильческих говоров Сибири (основные сведения, задания, материалы) : учебное пособие / Васильев В. П., Васильева Е. В. - Кемерово : КемГУ, 2013. - 108 с.
- Климовская Г. И. «О синлексическом слое словарного состава русской народно-разговорной речи XVII–XVIII вв.» // Актуальные проблемы лексикологии и словообразования. Новосибирск, 1973.
- Блинова О. И. «Словарь антонимов сибирского говора». Томск, 2003. 242 с.
