= Abayantsev =

Abayantsev (Russian: Абая́нцев; masculine) or Abayantseva (Абая́нцева; feminine) is a Russian last name, a variant of which is Oboyantsev (Обоя́нцев; masculine) or Oboyantseva (Обоя́нцева; feminine). It derives from the demonym "обоянец" (oboyanets) or, in dialects with akanye, "абаянец" (abayanets), meaning one from Oboyan.
