= Siberians =

Russians from Siberia

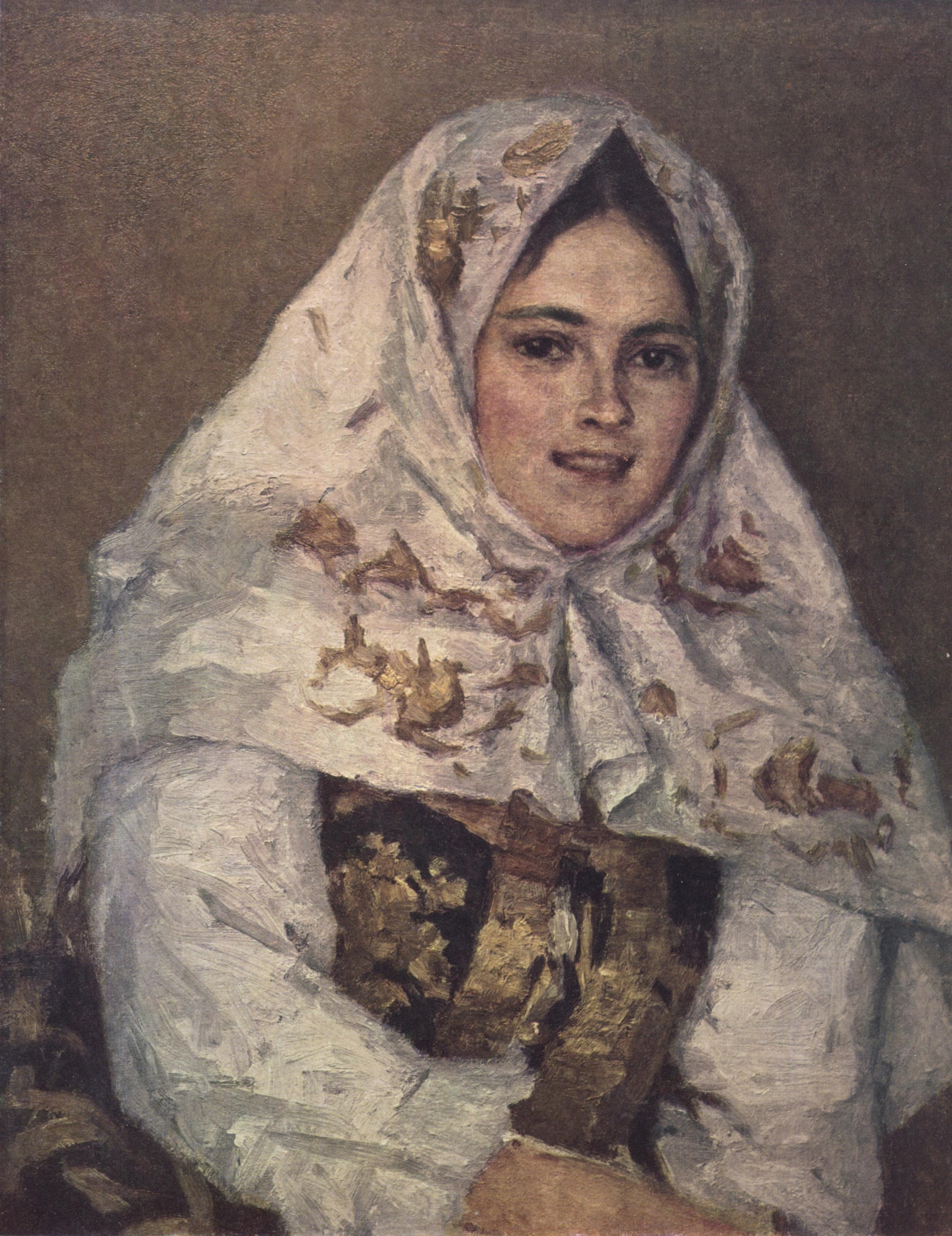
Siberian beauty of Vasily Surikov (1891)

The Siberians, or Siberiaks, (Sibriatic) (Russian: сибиряки, romanized: sibiryaki, pronounced [sʲɪbʲɪrʲɪˈkʲi]) are the ethnically Russian inhabitants of Siberia. They are considered a subgroup or ethnographic group of the Russians.

== As demonym ==
In Russian, the word "Siberian" is typically a designation for the ethnic Russian inhabitants of the region (like New Englanders in US), while indigenous minorities are referred to by the words "native peoples of Siberia" or "small peoples of Siberia".

In anthropological contexts, as well as in common parlance, "Siberian" can also be used to denote the Indigenous peoples of Siberia.

== As sub-ethnic group ==
In ethnology, the term is often used to refer to the Old-Timers (Starozhily or old settlers) — the earliest Russian population of Siberia during its Russian conquest in the 16th–17th centuries and their descendants. Later settlers, especially the second half of the 19th – early 20th centuries, were called "the Russian" (Siberian dialects: "Raseyskie") by the Siberians.

The dialects of the Siberians were formed mainly on the basis of Northern Russian dialects.

Ideologies of Siberian regionalism (Siberian nationalism) considered the Siberians to be a separate people from the Russians. Among contemporary ethnologists there are both opponents and supporters of this point of view. In 1918, under the control of the Siberian regionalists, there was a short-lived "Siberian Republic".

In the course of 2002 and 2010 Russian Census, the ethnonym "Siberiak" was indicated as the main one by a small number of respondents.

== See also ==
- Kamchadals
- Kamenschik
- Semeiskie

== Bibliography ==
- Anisimova, Alla; Echevskaya, Olga (2018). "Siberian regional identity: self-perception, solidarity, or political claim?". In Edith W. Clowes; Gisela Erbslöh; Ani Kokobobo (eds.). Russia's Regional Identities: The Power of the Provinces. Routledge Contemporary Russia and Eastern Europe Series. London; New York: Routledge. ISBN 978-1-138-20102-6.
- Schweitzer, Peter; Vakhtin, Nikolai; Golovko, Evgeniy (2005). "The Difficulty of Being Oneself: Identity Politics of "Old-Settler" Communities in Northeastern Siberia" (PDF). In Erich Kasten (ed.). Rebuilding Identities. Pathways to Reformin Post-Soviet Siberia. Berlin: Dietrich Reimer Verlag. pp. 135–151 – via Siberian-studies.org.
- Sushko, Valentina A. (June 2009). "Сибирский национализм и борьба за власть в крае (март 1917 — ноябрь 1918 г.)" [Siberian nationalism and the struggle for power in the region (March 1917 – November 1918)] (PDF). Вестник Томского государственного университета [ Tomsk State University Bulletin] (in Russian). 323: 174–179. ISSN 1561-7793.
- Vakhtin, Nikolai; Golovko, Eugeniy; Schweitzer, Peter (2004). Русские старожилы Сибири: социальные и символические аспекты самосознания [Russian Old-Settlers of Siberia: Social and Symbolic Aspects of Identity] (PDF) (in Russian). Moscow: Novoe izdatel’stvo. ISBN 5-98379-005-6.
- Vlasova, Irina V. (1997). "Русские в Сибири и на Дальнем Востоке" [The Russians in Siberia and the Far East]. In Alexandrov, V.A.; Vlasova, I.V.; Polishchuk, N.S. (eds.). Русские [The Russians] (in Russian). Moscow: Nauka. pp. 114–117. ISBN 5-02-010320-9. (N.N. Miklukho-Maklai Institute of Ethnology and Anthropology RAS).
- Watrous, Stephen (1993). "The Regionalist Conception of Siberia, 1860 to 1920". In Diment, Galya; Slezkine, Yuri (eds.). Between Heaven and Hell: The Myth of Siberia in Russian Culture. New York: St. Martin's Press. pp. 113–132. ISBN 978-0-312-06072-5.
