= Dagestani Russian =

Variety of Russian

- Native to: Russia
- Region: Dagestan
- Language family: Indo-European: Balto-Slavic; Slavic; East Slavic; Russian; Dagestani Russian

Language codes
- ISO 639-3: –
- IETF: ru-u-sd-ruda

Dagestani Russian (Russian: дагестанский русский) is a regional variety of the Russian language spoken in Dagestan, a constituent republic of the Russian Federation, and some of the neighboring regions including Astrakhan Oblast and Kalmykia. It is characterized by heavy influence from vernacular languages, mostly those belonging to the Northeast Caucasian and Turkic language families.

== Features ==
Dagestani Russian is an umbrella term for a broad group of vernacular-influenced and often partly creolized Russian varieties, rather than a single dialect with easily identifiable and describable traits. The degree of difference from standard Russian varies between speakers depending on their age, education, occupation, location and other social factors. Most of the differences come from the influence of local minority languages, so it also matters which of the vernaculars one speaks. Even though Russian is a second language for many Dagestanis, and thus Dagestani Russian is often a non-native accent, it is not always the case. With the rapid urbanization in the area, Dagestanis born in ethnically and linguistically diverse cities to parents originating from more monoethnic and monolingual rural areas may acquire a heavily vernacular-influenced Russian variety as their first language while not speaking their heritage languages natively.

One of the most common traits of Dagestani Russian varieties is frequent use of the constructions же есть (že jest) and есть же (jest že) and their contracted forms жиесь (žijes) and ежжи (ježži). They are used as topic markers, a concept absent from standard Russian but common in vernacular languages of the area. These expressions are also considered iconic of the dialect and are often used as a marker of regional identity, an example being the Dagestani cuisine restaurant "Жи Есть" in Moscow.

Another common feature is the unusual handling of Russian reflexive verbs. Most vernacular languages lack the concept, so many Dagestani Russian speakers are not used to it and subsequently "misuse" such verbs, speaking from the perspective of a standard Russian speaker. On the one hand, the reflexive suffix -ся may be dropped where it is necessary in standard Russian. On the other hand, it may appear where it usually does not.

Phonetic and phonological differences from the standard language are a common occurrence in Dagestani Russian. For example, the word вацок (wacok) 'brother', commonly used in the dialect, is a loanword from Avar. Unlike standard Russian, Avar has the phoneme [w] (voiced labio-velar approximant) in its phonemic inventory, and it is also used in that word in Dagestani Russian.
