= Moscow dialect =

Dialect of the Russian language

- Moscow accent
- Московское произношение
- Pronunciation: [mɐˈskofskəjə prəɪznɐˈʂenʲɪ(j)ɪ]
- Region: Moscow
- Language family: Indo-European: Balto-Slavic; Slavic; East Slavic; Russian; Central Russian; Moscow dialect
- Early forms: Proto-Indo-European: Proto-Balto-Slavic; Proto-Slavic; Old Russian; Middle Russian
- Writing system: Russian alphabet

Language codes
- ISO 639-3: –
- IETF: ru-u-sd-rumow

The Moscow dialect or Moscow accent (Russian: московское произношение, romanized: moskovskoye proiznosheniye, IPA: [mɐˈskofskəjə prəɪznɐˈʂenʲɪ(j)ɪ]), sometimes Central Russian, is the spoken Russian language variety used in Moscow – one of the two major pronunciation norms of the Russian language alongside the Saint Petersburg norm. Influenced by both northern and southern Russian dialects, the Moscow dialect is the basis of the Russian literary language.

== Overview ==
The 1911 edition of the Encyclopædia Britannica wrote:

Literary Russian as spoken by educated people throughout the empire is the Moscow dialect... The Moscow dialect really covers a very small area, not even the whole of the government of Moscow, but political causes have made it the language of the governing classes and hence of literature. It is a border dialect, having the southern pronunciation of unaccented o as a, but in the jo for accented e before a hard consonant it is akin to the North and it has also kept the northern pronunciation of g instead of the southern h. So too unaccented e sounds like i or ji.

== History ==
In the 15th century, the Moscow dialect was similar to the northern Russian dialects in its phonological system, except that, unlike now, it was not characterized by the ts–ch merger peculiar to Novgorod Russian. It shared the phonetic and grammatical features of Rostov-Suzdal and Vladimir Russian, which were part of the Vladimir-Volga subdialect of northern Russian. The changes in the system of sounds in Russian during the Moscow period (15th to 17th centuries) primarily include the spread of akanye, as well as the preservation of certain pronunciations of 'e' before hard consonants in the 'ecclesiastical style', the complete merging of 'е' and 'ѣ', and the sporadic use of [ɣ] for [ɡ] in a small number of words.

== Examples ==
Dialect	понятно Understood	что what	ничего nothing	Explanation
Moscow and Central Russia	[pɐˈnʲatnə]	[ʂto]	[nʲɪtɕɪˈvo]	Unstressed /o/ becomes [ɐ] or [ə]. ⟨ч⟩ is pronounced [ʂ]. Intervocalic ⟨г⟩ is pronounced [v].
The North	ponjatno	što	ničevo	
Old St. Petersburg	panjatna	čto	ničego	
The South	panjatna	što	ničevo	

== Sources ==
- Matthews, William Kleesman (August 2013). The Structure and Development of Russian. Cambridge University Press. ISBN 978-1-107-61939-5.
