= Moscovian =

Moscovian may refer to:

- Something of, from, or related to Moscow, the capital of Russia
- Moscovian dialect of the Russian language
- Moscovian age, a time interval of the Carboniferous in the ICS geologic timescale
