= Central Russian dialects =

Dialect group of Russian

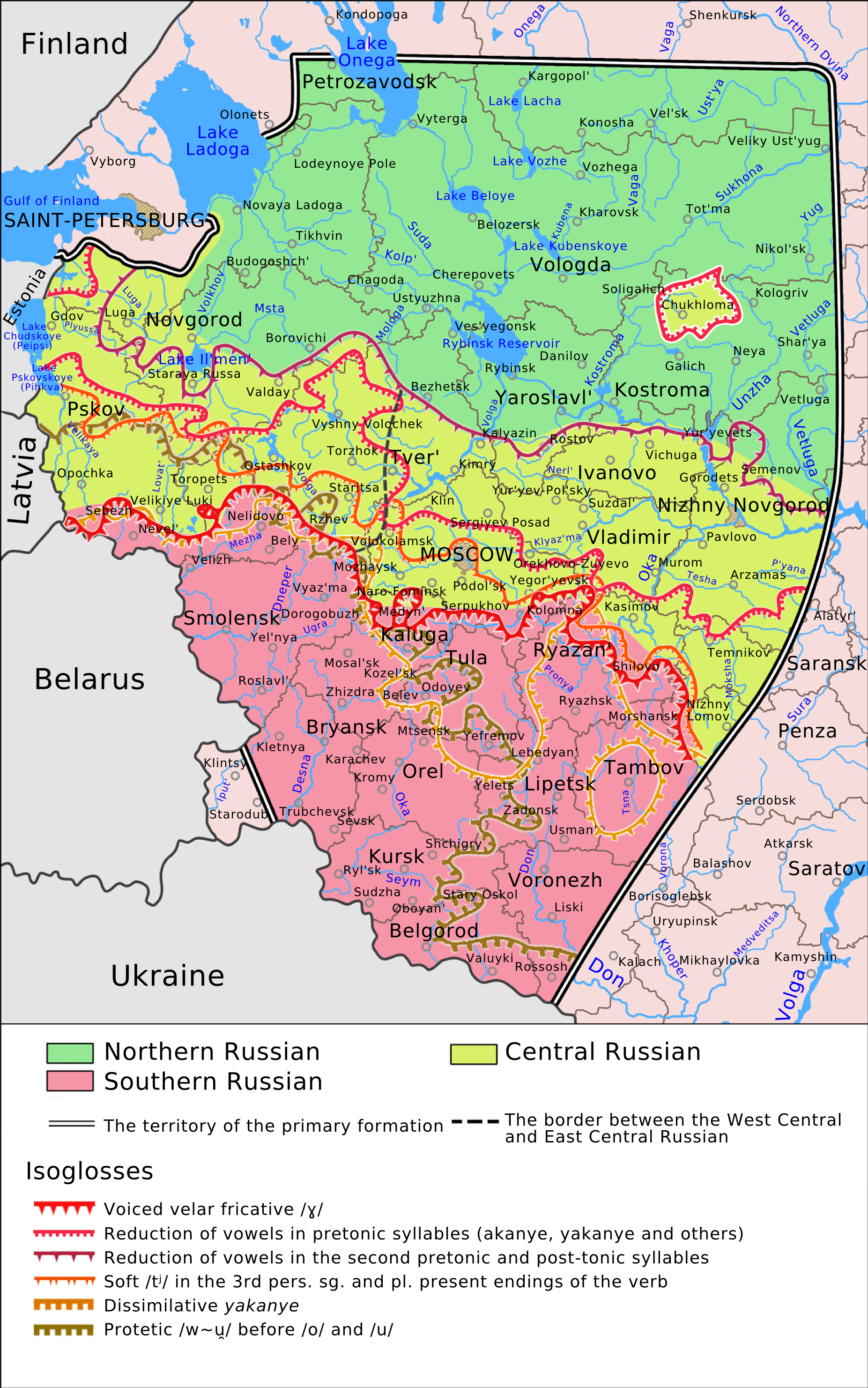
Map of the Russian dialects of the primary formation (Central Russian is light green)

The Central or Middle Russian dialects (Russian: Среднерусские говоры) is one of the main groups of Russian dialects. Of Northern Russian origin, it has nonetheless assumed many Southern Russian features.

The official dialect (Standard Russian) originates from a dialect from this group.

== Territory ==
- The territory of the primary formation (e.g. that consist of "Old" Russia of the 16th century before Eastern conquests by Ivan IV) is fully or partially modern regions (oblasts): Moscow, Tver, Vladimir, Ivanovo, Pskov, Novgorod, Leningrad, Nizhny Novgorod, Yaroslavl (in Rostov), Ryazan (in Kasimov) and the enclave of Chukhloma.
- The territory of the second formation (e.g. where Russians settled after the 16th century) consist of most of the land to the South-East of Moscow, that is the middle and lower Volga, Ural as well as Siberia and Far East. It also includes Saint-Petersburg, whose dialect is fairly close to Standard Russian.

== Features ==
Central Russian is a transitional stage between the North and the South, so some of its dialects closer to the North have northern features, and those closer to the South have the southern ones.

== Classification ==
There are two types of internal differentiation of Central Russian dialects, the first is based on the methods of linguistic geography (areal classification), the second is based on typological patterns (structural-typological classification)

The most well known and widespread are areal classification.

The main groups in the Central Russian dialects:

- Pskov group of dialects
- Western group of dialects
- Eastern group of dialects

Pskov group is transitional to the dialects of Belarus.

== See also ==
- Northern Russian dialects
- Southern Russian dialects
- Old Novgorod dialect
- Vowel reduction in Russian
