= Vowel reduction in Russian =

Sound change of vowels in Russian phonology

In the pronunciation of the Russian language, several ways of vowel reduction (and its absence) are distinguished between the standard language and dialects. Russian orthography most often does not reflect vowel reduction, which can confuse foreign-language learners, but some spelling reforms have changed some words.

There are five vowel phonemes in Standard Russian. Vowels tend to merge when they are unstressed. The vowels /a/ and /o/ have the same unstressed allophones for a number of dialects and reduce to an unclear schwa /ə/. Unstressed /e/ may become more central and merge with /i/. Under some circumstances, /a/, /e/, /i/ and /o/ may all merge. The fifth vowel, /u/, may also be centralized but does not typically merge with any of the other vowels.

Other types of reduction are phonetic, such as that of the high vowels (/i/ and /u/), which become near-close. Thus, игра́ть ('to play') is pronounced [ɪˈɡratʲ], and узна́ть ('to recognize') is pronounced [ʊzˈnatʲ].

== General description ==
The five Russian vowels /u, i, e, a, o/ in unstressed position show two levels of reduction:

1. The first-degree reduction in the first pretonic position (immediately before the stress).
2. The second-degree reduction in positions other than the first pretonic position.

The allophonic result of the reduction is also heavily dependent on the quality or the nonexistence of the preceding consonant. Thus, the reduction is further grouped into three types according to the environment:

1. After the hard (non-palatalized or velarized) consonants (including always hard /ts/).
2. After the hard retroflex sibilants /ʂ/ and /ʐ/.
3. After the soft (palatalized) consonants (including the soft /tɕ/ and /ɕː/) and semi-vowel /j/.

The unstressed vowels also may be grouped in series that reflect similar patterns of reduction:

1. High /u/ and /i/ (never reduced).
2. Non-high /a/, /e/ and /o/ (always reduced).
3. Back /a/ and /o/ (both exhibit akanye).
4. Front /i/ and /e/ (both exhibit ikanye).
5. Back high /u/ (never reduced).

== High vowels ==
Two high vowels /u/ and /i/ are usually thought to undergo no reduction. However, on the phonetic level, they show allophonic centralization, particularly under the influence of preceding or following consonants.

The unstressed high back vowel /u/ is either [ʊ] (after hard consonants, written ⟨у⟩) or [ʊ̈] (after soft consonants, written ⟨ю⟩, except ⟨чу⟩, ⟨щу⟩).

The unstressed high front vowel /i/ is either [i] or [ɪ] (after soft consonants, written ⟨и⟩) or [ɨ] or [ɪ̈] (after hard consonants, written ⟨ы⟩, except ⟨ши⟩, ⟨жи⟩). Nevertheless, in rapid colloquial speech they both may be reduced to schwa [ə], for example, до́брым [ˈdobrɨ̆m] ('kind', instrumental case, singular masculine neuter) versus до́бром [ˈdobrəm] ('kind', prepositional case, singular masculine neuter). The case ending //-im// in the former case may surface as [-əm] like the case ending //-om//, which thus leads to the merger of /i/ and /o/, or as де́лают [ˈdʲeləjʊ̈t] ('they do') versus де́лает [ˈdʲeləjɪt] ('he/it does'). Both may surface as [ˈdʲeləɪt] or [ˈdʲeləːt].

== Back vowels ==
Other than in Northern Russian dialects, Russian-speakers have a strong tendency to merge unstressed /a/ and /o/. The phenomenon is called akanye (аканье), and some scholars postulate an early tendency towards it in the earliest known textual evidence of confusion between written "a" and "o" in a manuscript that was copied in Moscow in 1339. Akanye contrasts with okanye (оканье) pronunciations in Standard Russian as follows:

- After hard (non-palatalised) consonants, the standard phonological rules prescribe a two-level reduction. The stressed vowel is normally the longest and the only place (with certain exceptions) that permits the [o]. In the syllable immediately before the stress and in absolute word-initial position, both reduce to [ɐ] (sometimes also transcribed as [ʌ]). In all other locations, /a/ and /o/ are reduced further to a short [ə]. For example, потоло́к [pətɐˈɫok] ('ceiling'), паро́м [pɐˈrom] ('ferry'), о́блако [ˈobləkə] ('cloud'), трава́ [trɐˈva] ('grass'). In practice, the second reduction has a gradient character: if the vowel in question is pronounced for enough time (such as by hyperarticulation), it may be pronounced as [ɐ]. Shorter durations have the effect of gradually transforming [ɐ] into schwa. Recently, it has been argued that the change of sound quality during the second-degree reduction is merely an artifact of duration-dependent "phonetic undershoot", when the speaker intends to pronounce [ɐ], but the limited time reduces the likelihood of the tongue being able to arrive at the intended vowel target.
- In fast speech, reduction ultimately may result in the vowel being dropped altogether, with the preceding consonant slightly lengthened or turned into a syllabic consonant: сапоги́ [sːpɐˈɡʲi], vs. [səpɐˈɡʲi] ('boots'), потоло́к [pːtɐˈlok] ('ceiling'), де́сять [ˈdʲesʲtʲ] ('ten').
- When ⟨аа⟩, ⟨ао⟩, ⟨оа⟩, or ⟨оо⟩ is written in a word, it indicates [ɐ.ɐ] so сообража́ть ('to realise') is pronounced [sɐ.ɐ.brɐˈʐatʲ].
- With prepositions, the processes occur even across word boundaries, as in под мо́рем [pɐˈd‿morʲɪm] ('under the sea'), на оборо́те [nɐ.ɐbɐˈrotʲɪ] ('on the reverse side', 'overleaf'). That does not occur with other parts of speech.
- Unstressed /o/ and /a/ merge with /e/ (and usually also with /i/, see below yekanye and ikanye) after /j/ and palatalised consonants (/o/ is written as ⟨е⟩ in those positions). For examples: ёж [jɵʂ] ('hedgehog') vs. ежи́ [jɪˈʐɨ] ('hedgehogs'), осётр [ɐˈsʲɵtr] ('sturgeon') vs. осетры́ [ɐsʲɪˈtrɨ] ('sturgeons'), ядро́ [jɪˈdro] ('kernel, core, nucleus, etc.') vs. я́дра [ˈjadrə] ('kernels, cores, nuclei, etc.'), ря́д [rʲat] ('row') vs. ряды́ [rʲɪˈdɨ] ('rows'). Likewise, unstressed /o/ (written as /e/) also merge into /i/ after postalveolars: for examples, жена́ [ʐɨˈna] 'wife' vs. жёны [ˈʐonɨ] 'wives', чёлн [t͡ɕɵɫn] ('dugout boat') vs. челны́ [t͡ɕɪɫˈnɨ] ('dugout boats'), шёлк [ʂoɫk] ('silk') vs. шелка́ [ʂɨɫˈka] ('silks'), щека́ [ɕːɪˈka] ('cheek, jowl, jaw') vs. щёки [ˈɕːɵkʲɪ] ('cheeks, jowls, jaws'), etc.

There are a number of exceptions to the above comments regarding the akanye:

- Unstressed /o/ is not always reduced in borrowing from foreign languages: ра́дио [ˈradʲɪ.o] ('radio'). The common pattern for that exception is the final unstressed о being preceded by another vowel (Анто́нио, кака́о, сте́рео). Compare with мо́но, фо́то whose final unstressed о is reduced to [ə].
- Speakers with old Moscow dialect reflexes pronounce unstressed /a/ as /ɨ/ after retroflex consonants /ʐ/ and /ʂ/ and thereby imitate the reduction of /o/. For other speakers, that pronunciation generally applies only to жале́ть [ʐɨˈlʲetʲ] ('to regret'), к сожале́нию [ksəʐɨˈlʲenʲɪju] ('unfortunately') and to oblique cases of ло́шадь [ˈloʂətʲ] ('horse'), such as лошаде́й [lə.ʂɨˈdʲej].
- /ɨ/ replaces /a/ after /t͡s/ in the oblique cases of some numerals: два́дцать [ˈdvat͡sɨtʲ] ('twenty').
- Across certain word-final suffixes, the reductions do not completely apply:
  - In certain suffixes, after palatalised consonants and /j/, /a/ and /o/ (which is written as ⟨е⟩) can be distinguished from /i/ and from each other: по́ле [ˈpolʲɪ] ('field' nominative singular neuter) is different from по́ля [ˈpolʲə] ('field' singular genitive), and the final sounds differ from the realisation of /i/ in that position.. In Moscow pronunciation of the first half of the 20th century, по́ле (nominative) and по́ля (genitive) were both pronounced [ˈpolʲə], but the prepositional case (в по́ле 'in the field') was pronounced [ˈf‿polʲɪ]; this can be explained by different underlying phonemes in the ending (/o/ in the nominative bit /e/ in the prepositional). Nowadays, по́ле is usually pronounced identically in the nominative and prepositional cases under the influence of spelling.
  - Unstressed /o/ in suffix -це does not merge with /i/ and is reduced to [ə] instead of [ɨ]: e.g. се́рдце [ˈsʲert͡sə] ('heart'); де́ревце [ˈdʲerʲɪft͡sə] ('sapling, small tree') vs. its synonym деревцо́ [dʲɪrʲɪfˈt͡so] (with stressed /o/ written as ⟨o⟩), etc.

== Front vowels ==
The main feature of front vowel reduction is ikanye (иканье), the merger of unstressed /e/ with /i/. Because /i/ has several allophones (depending on both stress and proximity to palatalised consonants), unstressed /e/ is pronounced as one of those allophones, rather than the close front unrounded vowel. For examples, се́мя [ˈsʲemʲə] ('seed') vs. семена́ [sʲɪmʲɪˈna] ('seeds'), че́реп [ˈt͡ɕerʲɪp] ('skull') vs. черепа́ [t͡ɕɪrʲɪˈpa] ('skulls'), цена́ [t͡sɨˈna] ('price') vs це́ны [ˈt͡sɛnɨ] ('prices'), etc.

In registers without the merger (yekanye or еканье), unstressed /e/ is more retracted. Even then, however, the distinction between unstressed /e/ and unstressed /i/ is most clearly heard in the syllable immediately before the stress. Thus, прида́ть ('to add to') contrasts with преда́ть ('to betray'); they are pronounced [prʲɪˈdatʲ] and [prʲe̠ˈdatʲ] respectively. In registers with ikanye, they are pronounced identically. The yekanye pronunciation is coupled with a stronger tendency for both unstressed /a/ and /o/, which are pronounced the same as /e/ after /j/ and palatalised consonants. In registers with ikanye, unstressed /a/, /o/, /e/, and /i/ after /j/ and palatalised consonants are merged into a single sound.

Speakers may switch between both pronunciations because of various factors, the most important factor likely being the speed of pronunciation.

== Yakanye ==
Yakanye (яканье) is the pronunciation of unstressed /e/ and /a/ after palatalised consonants preceding a stressed syllable as /a/, rather than /i/ (несли́ is pronounced [nʲasˈlʲi], not [nʲɪsˈlʲi]).

This pronunciation is observed in Belarusian and in most Southern Russian dialects, as is expressed in a quip (with liberal yakanye):

Orthography	Standard pronunciation	Yakanye pronunciation	Translation
А у нас в Ряза́ни	[ə‿ʊ‿ˈnas v‿rʲɪˈzanʲɪ]	[a w nəs wrʲaˈzanʲə]	And we have in Ryazan
пироги́ с глаза́ми.	[pʲɪrɐˈɡʲɪ z‿ɡlɐˈzamʲɪ]	[pʲɪˈraɣʲɪ z ɣlaˈzamʲə]	Pies with eyes:
Их едя́т,	[ɪx jɪˈdʲat]	[ɪxʲ jaˈdʲætʲ]	They are being eaten,
а они́ глядя́т.	[ɐ‿ɐˈnʲi ɡlʲɪˈdʲat]	[ə aˈnʲi ɣlʲaˈdʲætʲ]	and they look.

That example also demonstrates other features of Southern dialects: palatalised final /tʲ/ in the third-person forms of verbs, [ɣ] for [ɡ] and [w] for [u] (in some places) and [v], clear unstressed [a] for [ɐ] or [ə].

== Spelling ==
Generally, vowel reduction is not reflected in the Russian spelling. However, in some words, the spelling has been changed based on vowel reduction and so some words are spelled despite their etymology:

- паро́м "ferry" (instead of поро́м),
- карава́й "a special type of bread" (instead of корова́й).

Spelling those words with ⟨а⟩ was already common in the 18th century, but it co-existed with the spelling with ⟨о⟩, conforming to etymology of those words. Dictionaries often gave both spellings. In the second half of the 19th century, Yakov Grot recommended spelling those words with ⟨о⟩ (conforming to their etymology), but his recommendations were not followed by all editors. The Ushakov Dictionary (1935–1940) gives паро́м, корова́й and карава́й. Finally the spelling of those words with ⟨а⟩ was set by the 1956 orthographic codification (orthographic rules and spelling dictionary). That is, in cases of doubt, codifiers of 1956 based their choice not on etymological conformity but on the spread of usage.

- свиде́тель "witness" (instead of more etymological сведе́тель).

That spelling has a long history and is based on a folk etymology basing the word on ви́деть (to see,) instead of ве́дать (to know), as seen in Old Church Slavonic etymon съвѣдѣтель sŭvědětelĭ.

In the closely related Belarusian, the original /o/ has merged with /a/, like in Standard Russian, but the reduced pronunciation is reflected in the spelling.

== See also ==
- Russian phonology
