= Southern Russian dialects =

Dialect group of Russian

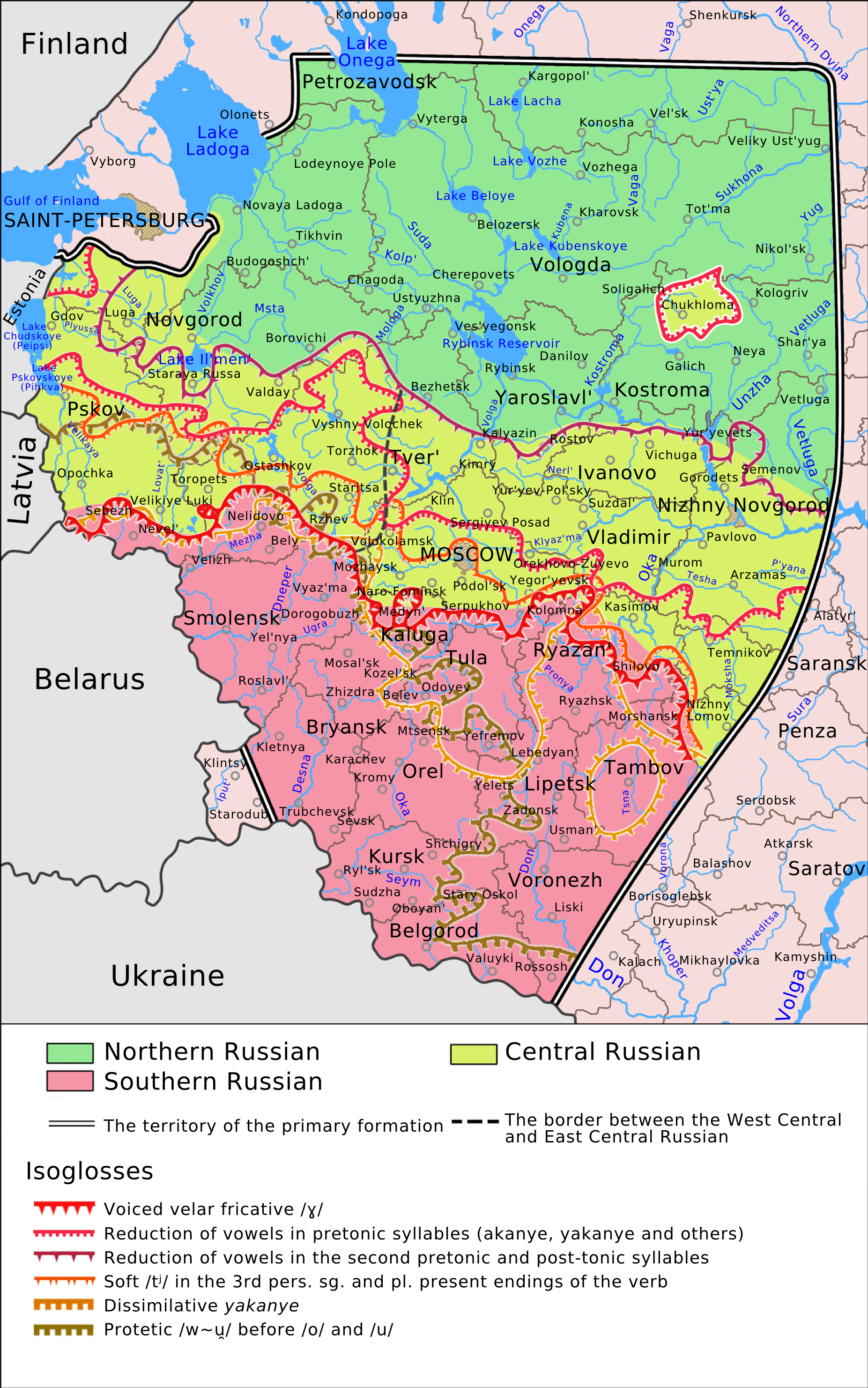
Map of the Russian dialects of the primary formation (Southern Russian is red)

Southern Russian is one of the main groups of Russian dialects.

== Territory ==
- The territory of the primary formation (i.e. that consists of "Old" Russia of the 16th century before Eastern conquests by Ivan IV) is entirely 11 modern regions (oblasts): Belgorod, Bryansk, Kaluga, Kursk, Lipetsk, Oryol, Ryazan, Smolensk, Tambov, Tula, Voronezh; and some southern parts of 3 regions: Moscow, Pskov, and Tver
- The territory of the second formation (i.e. where Russians settled after the 16th century) consists of most of the land of lower Don and Volga, the Northern Caucasus, as well as Southern Ural, Siberia, and Far East.

== Phonology ==
- Unstressed /o/ undergoes different degrees of vowel reduction mainly to [a] (strong akanye), less often to [ɐ], [ə], [ɨ].
- Unstressed /o/, /e/, /a/ following palatalized consonants and preceding a stressed syllable are not reduced to [ɪ] (like in the Moscow dialect), being instead pronounced [æ] in such positions (e.g. несли is pronounced [nʲæsˈlʲi], not [nʲɪsˈlʲi]) – this is called yakanye/яканье.
- Fricative /ɣ/ instead of the Standard and Northern /ɡ/. Soft /ɣʲ/ is usually [j~ʝ].
- Semivowel /w~u̯/ in the place of the Standard and Northern /v/ and final /l/.
- /x~xv~xw/ where the Standard and Northern have /f/.
- Prosthetic /w~u̯/ before /u/ and stressed /o/: во́кна, ву́лица, Standard Russian окна, улица "windows, street".
- Prosthetic /j/ before /i/ and /e/: етот, ентот, Standard Russian этот "this".
- In Pskov (southern) and Ryazan sub-groups only one voiceless affricate exists. Merging of Standard Russian /t͡ʃ/ and /t͡s/ into one consonant whether /t͡s/ or /t͡ɕ/.

== Morphology ==
- Palatalized final /tʲ/ in 3rd person forms of verbs (this is unpalatalized in the Standard and Northern dialects): он ходить, они ходять "he goes, they go"
- Occasional dropping of the 3rd person ending /tʲ/ at all: он ходи, они ходя "he goes, they go"
- Oblique case forms of personal pronouns мяне́, табе́, сабе́ instead of Standard Russian мне, тебе, себе "me, you, -self".

== Relation to other languages ==
Some of these features such as akanye/yakanye, a debuccalized or lenited /ɡ/, a semivowel /w~u̯/, and palatalized final /tʲ/ in 3rd person forms of verbs are also present in modern Belarusian and some dialects of Ukrainian (Eastern Polesian), indicating a linguistic continuum.

== See also ==
- Central Russian dialects
- Northern Russian dialects
- Doukhobor dialect

== Bibliography ==
- Crosswhite, Katherine Margaret (2000), "Vowel Reduction in Russian: A Unified Account of Standard, Dialectal, and 'Dissimilative' Patterns" (PDF), University of Rochester Working Papers in the Language Sciences, 1 (1): 107–172, archived from the original (PDF) on 2012-02-06
- Shevelov, George Y. (1977), "On the Chronology of h and the New g in Ukrainian" (PDF), in Harvard Ukrainian Studies, vol. 1, Cambridge: Harvard Ukrainian Research Institute, pp. 137–152, archived from the original (PDF) on 2011-07-03
- Sussex, Roland; Cubberley, Paul (2006). "Dialects of Russian". The Slavic languages. Cambridge: Cambridge University Press. pp. 521–526. ISBN 978-0-521-22315-7.
