= Akanye =

Sound change in Slavic languages

Akanye (Russian: аканье [ˈakənʲjɪ]) or akanje (Belarusian: аканне [ˈakanʲːe]; lit. 'a-ing') is a sound change in Slavic languages in which the phonemes /o/ or /e/ are realized as more or less close to [a]. It is a case of vowel reduction.

The most familiar example is probably Russian akanye (pronounced but not systematically represented orthographically in the standard language). Akanye also occurs in:

- Standard Belarusian (represented orthographically)
- Northern (Polissian and Slobozhan) Ukrainian dialects
- Slovene dialects (e.g., Lower Carniolan dialects),
- Some subgroups of the Kajkavian dialect of Croatian
- Bulgarian dialects (e.g., the Rhodope dialects, including the Smolyan dialect).
- Polish dialects (Podlasie, Kresy)

== Description ==
In Belarusian аканне (akanne), both non-softened and softened /o/ and /a/ and other phonemes phonetically merge into [a] in unstressed positions; see Belarusian phonology.

In Russian а́канье (akan'ye) (except for Northern dialects), /o/ and /a/ phonetically merge in unstressed positions. If not preceded by a palatalized (soft) consonant, these phonemes give [ɐ] (sometimes also transcribed as [ʌ]) in the syllable immediately before the stress and in absolute word-initial position. In other unstressed locations, non-softened /o/ and /a/ are further reduced towards a short, poorly enunciated [ə]. The phonemic dialectal feature of clear distinction of the unstressed o (i.e., no reduction) is called okanye (Russian: о́канье), literally "o-ing".

After soft consonants, unstressed /o/ and /a/ are pronounced like [ɪ] in most varieties of Russian (see vowel reduction in Russian for details); this reduction is not considered a manifestation of akanye. Unlike Belarusian akanne, Russian akanye does not affect softened vowels.

In Slovene, akanje may be partial (affecting only syllables before or after the stressed vowel) or complete (affecting all vowels in a word). Examples from various Slovene dialects: domú → damú 'at home' (pretonic o), dnò → dnà 'bottom' (tonic o), léto → líəta (posttonic o), ne vém → na vém 'I don't know' (pretonic e), hléb → hlàb 'loaf' (tonic e), jêčmen → jèčman 'barley' (posttonic e).

== See also ==
- Vowel reduction in Russian – about ikanye.

== Notes ==
=== Sources ===
- Jones, Daniel; Ward, Dennis (1969), The Phonetics of Russian, Cambridge University Press
- Padgett, Jaye; Tabain, Marija (2005), "Adaptive Dispersion Theory and Phonological Vowel Reduction in Russian" (PDF), Phonetica, 62 (1): 14–54, doi:10.1159/000087223, PMID 16116302, S2CID 2551922
