= Northern Russian dialects =

Dialect group of Russian

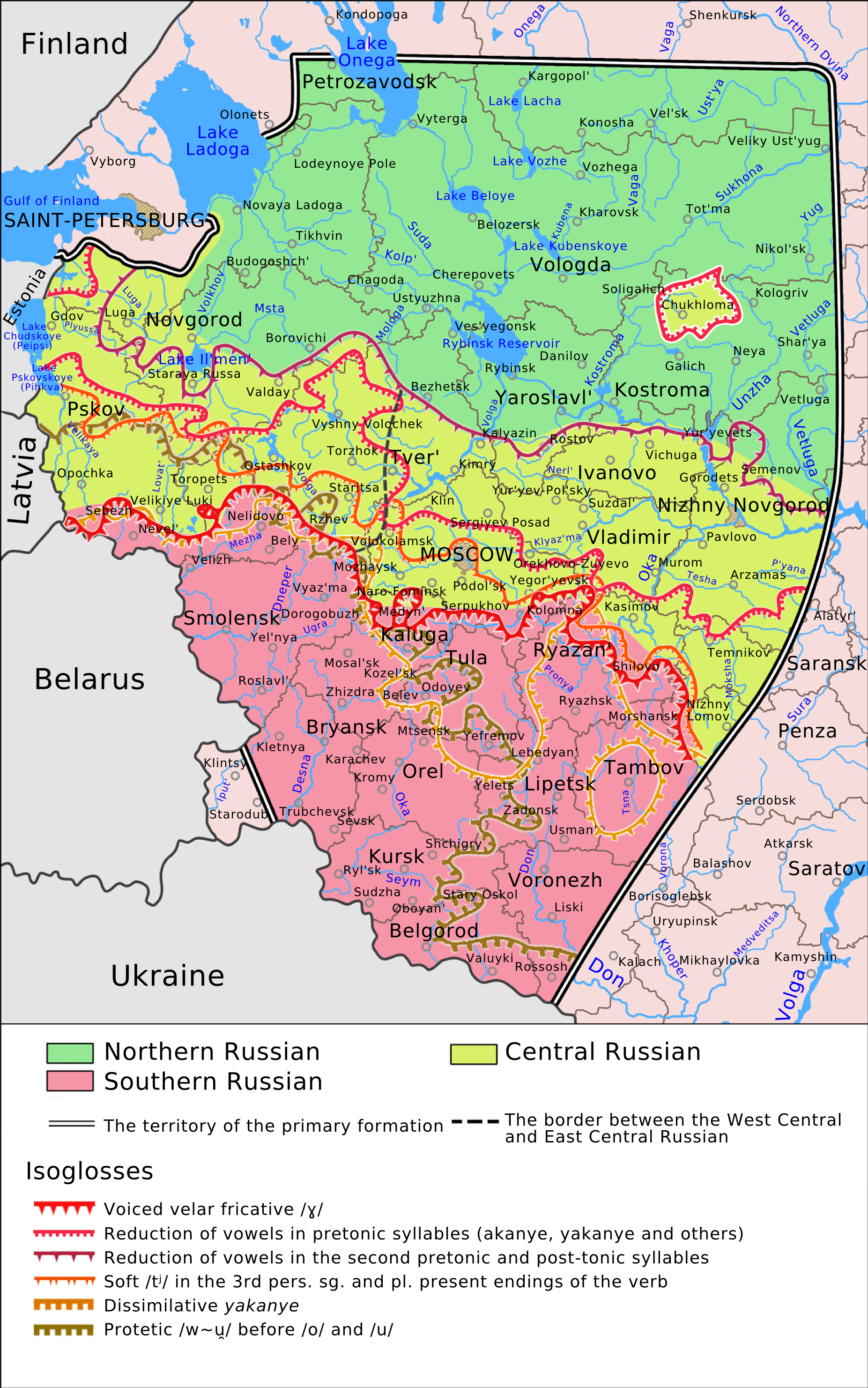
Map of the Russian dialects of the primary formation (Northern Russian is dark green)

The northern Russian dialects make up one of the main groups of the Russian dialects.

== Territory ==
Russian dialects and territorial varieties are divided in two conceptual chronological and geographic categories:

- The territory of the primary formation (e.g. that consist of "Old" Russia of the 16th century before Eastern conquests by Ivan IV) is fully or partially modern regions (oblasts): Vologda, Kostroma, Yaroslavl, Novgorod, Leningrad, Nizhny Novgorod, Arkhangelsk.
- The territory of the second formation (e.g. where Russians settled after the 16th century) consist of most of the land to the North and North-East of Central Russia, that is Karelia, Murmansk, Vyatka, Perm, Komi, Udmurtia, and as well as Siberia and Far East.

== List of sub-dialects ==
- Pomor dialects
- Olonets group
- Novgorod group
- Siberian dialects
- Vologda-Kirov group
- Vladimir-Volga group

== Phonology ==
- Lack of vowel reduction: unstressed /ɔ/ does not merge with /a/ (okanye). Unstressed /ɔ/, /a/ and /ɛ/ after soft consonants also do not typically merge.
- Some dialects have high or diphthongal /e̝~i̯ɛ/ (in the Novgorod subgroup even /i/) as a reflex of *ě.
- In the eastern part of the group the change of every *e to /ɔ/ before hard (unpalatalized) consonants occurs (in Standard Russian only in stressed syllables). *ě also changes to /ɔ/ in these positions but only in stressed syllables.
- Also in the eastern part of the dialect group there is /o̝~u̯ɔ/ in certain positions instead of Standard Russian /ɔ/.
- Tsokanye: the merger of Standard Russian /t͡ɕ/ and /t͡s/ into one consonant whether /t͡s/, /t͡sʲ/ or /t͡ɕ/ (like in Pskov and Ryazan Southern Russian dialects).
- In the Vologda region, final hard /ɫ/ is replaced by a semivowel /w~u̯/.
- /ɡ/, /v/, /f/ are like in Standard Russian (differs from Southern Russian). Nevertheless, in some sub-dialects /v/, /f/ can also be replaced with semivowel /w~u̯/ like in Southern Russian.
- In some dialects traces of unreduced *tl, dl, which normally reduced to /ɫ/ in all of East Slavic: Жерегло /ʐɛrɛˈɡɫɔ/ "the sound between Lake Pskov and Lake Chud" (instead of expected жерело /ʐɛrɛˈɫɔ/), перецок /pʲɛrʲɛˈt͡sɔk/ from earlier перецокл /pʲɛrʲɛˈt͡sɔkɫ/ "reread (past tense)" (instead of standard перечёл /pʲɛrʲɛˈt͡ɕɔɫ/). In these examples, the groups *tl, dl dissimilated to /kɫ/, /ɡɫ/ instead of reducing to /ɫ/. Some (Shakhmatov, Durnovo) see this as an indication of possible West Slavic admixture in those areas, while others (Trubetzkoy, Lehr-Spławiński) treat it as an archaism from Proto-Slavic times.

== Morphology ==
- A suffixed definite article -to, -ta, -te similarly existing in Bulgarian.
- 3rd person verbal ending with non-palatalized -t as in Standard Russian.

== Vocabulary ==
Northern dialects are characterized by a number of words like, изба ('log hut'), квашня, озимь ('winter crop'), лаять ('to bark'), ухват, орать ('to plough'), жито ('rye'), беседки ('gathering'), шибко ('very much'), баской ('beautiful') and others. They also have about 200 words of Uralic origin.

== See also ==
- Central Russian dialects
- Southern Russian dialects
- Old Novgorod dialect
- Boris Shergin – a writer of the Pomor dialect
- Vowel reduction in Russian
