= Russian language =

East Slavic language

Russian
- русский (russkiy)
- Pronunciation: [ˈruskʲɪj jɪˈzɨk]
- Native to: Russia, other areas of the Russian-speaking world
- Speakers: L1: 145 million (2026); L2: 65.2 million (2026); Total: 210 million (2026)
- Language family: Indo-European: Balto-Slavic; Slavic; East Slavic; Russian
- Early forms: Proto-Indo-European: Proto-Balto-Slavic; Proto-Slavic; Old Russian; Middle Russian
- Writing system: Cyrillic (Russian alphabet); Russian Braille

Official status
- Official language in: 5 UN member states: Russia (state); Belarus (co-official); Kazakhstan (co-official); Kyrgyzstan (co-official); Tajikistan (as inter-ethnic language designated by the constitution); Official on regional level: Moldova: Gagauzia (co-official); Left Bank of the Dniester (co-official); Ukraine: Autonomous Republic of Crimea (co-official) (Note: The status of Crimea and of the city of Sevastopol is under dispute between Russia and Ukraine since March 2014; Ukraine and the majority of the international community consider Crimea to be an autonomous republic of Ukraine and Sevastopol to be one of Ukraine's cities with special status, whereas Russia, on the other hand, considers Crimea to be a federal subject of Russia and Sevastopol to be one of Russia's three federal cities); States with limited recognition: Abkhazia (Note: Abkhazia and South Ossetia are only partially recognized countries.) (co-official); South Ossetia (co-official); Transnistria (state); Organizations: United Nations: IAEA; ICAO; UNESCO; WHO CIS EAEU CSTO SCO OSCE ATS ISO
- Recognised minority language in: List: Armenia China Czech Republic Moldova Romania Slovakia Ukraine
- Regulated by: V.V. Vinogradov Russian Language Institute of the Russian Academy of Sciences

Language codes
- ISO 639-1: ru
- ISO 639-2: rus
- ISO 639-3: rus
- Glottolog: russ1263
- Linguasphere: 53-AAA-ea < 53-AAA-e (varieties: 53-AAA-eaa to 53-AAA-eat)
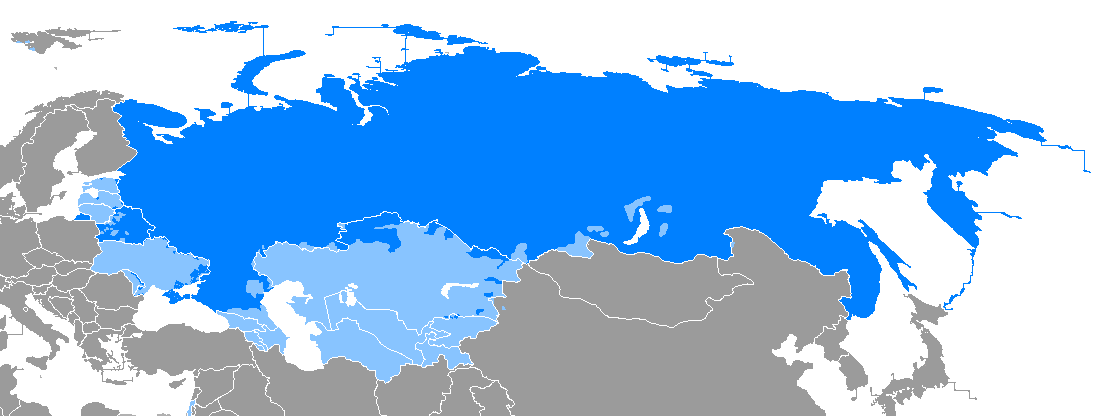
- Majority of Russian speakers Minority of Russian speakers

Russian (Note: русский, russkiy or русский язык, russkiy yazyk, pronounced [ˈruskʲɪj jɪˈzɨk]) is an East Slavic language belonging to the Balto-Slavic branch of the Indo-European language family. It is one of the four extant East Slavic languages, (Note: Including Rusyn, which is sometimes classified as a dialect of Ukrainian in Ukraine.) and is the native language of the Russian people. Russian was the de facto (and de jure in its final years (Note: From 1990.)) official language of the former Soviet Union. It has remained an official language of Russia, Belarus, Kazakhstan, and Kyrgyzstan, has constitutional status as the language of inter-ethnic communication in Tajikistan, and is still used as a lingua franca in Ukraine, Moldova, the Caucasus, Central Asia, and to a lesser extent in the Baltic states and Israel.

Russian has over 210 million total speakers worldwide. It is the most spoken native language in Europe, the most spoken Slavic language, and the most geographically widespread language of Eurasia. It is the world's seventh-most spoken language by number of native speakers, and the world's eleventh-most spoken language by total number of speakers. Russian is one of two official languages aboard the International Space Station, one of the six official languages of the United Nations, as well as the seventh most widely used language on the Internet.

Russian is written using the Russian alphabet of the Cyrillic script; it distinguishes between consonant phonemes with palatal secondary articulation and those without, the so-called "soft" and "hard" sounds. Almost every consonant has hard–soft counterparts, and the distinction is a prominent feature of the language, which is usually shown in writing not by a change of the consonant but rather by changing the following vowel. Another important aspect is the reduction of unstressed vowels. Stress, which is often unpredictable, is not normally indicated orthographically, though an optional acute accent may be used to mark stress, such as to distinguish between homographic words (e.g. замо́к [zamók, 'lock'] and за́мок [zámok, 'castle']), or to indicate the proper pronunciation of uncommon words or proper nouns.

Russian is a typical fusional language, where a single inflectional morpheme at the end of a word is used to denote multiple grammatical features. In addition to inflection for morphology Russian also actively uses prefixes and suffixes for word formation, more so than most other Slavic languages. Also, Russian uses descriptive phrases (like железная дорога, zheleznaya doroga, lit. 'iron road') where other Slavic languages often prefer single-word derivatives (such as Czech železnice).

== Name of the language ==
The linguonym russky yazyk (русский язык) is historically associated with the ethnonym and toponym Rus (Русь), from which the forms russky (русский) and related variants developed. Rus is found in Russian literary monuments of the 11th–14th centuries, while the modern form, Rossiya (Россия), began to appear in Russian writing in the 15th century.

In Russian literary monuments of the 15th–16th centuries, the Byzantine-influenced forms Rosiya (Росия) and Roseya (Росея) emerged. By the early 17th century, the terms Rosiyskoye tsarstvo (Росийское царство, lit. 'Russian tsardom') and Velikaya Rosiya (Великая Росия, lit. 'Great Russia') became established in Russian usage, alongside the forms rossky (росский) and ross (росс), which arose under Greek influence. The adjective rossiysky (российский) also came into use as a designation for the language; both russky and rossiysky were treated as synonyms, while the Greek-influenced forms predominated in the "high style" of the language.

By the early 19th century, rossky and ross had come to be perceived as archaic, while russky was revived and gradually displaced rossiysky as the ethnic designation associated with the Russian language. The adjective rossiysky subsequently became associated primarily with state affiliation rather than ethnicity.

== Classification ==
Russian is an East Slavic language of the wider Indo-European family, alongside Belarusian, Rusyn, and Ukrainian. In many places in eastern and southern Ukraine and throughout Belarus, these languages are spoken interchangeably, and in certain areas, traditional bilingualism has resulted in language mixtures such as surzhyk in eastern Ukraine and trasianka in Belarus. Many speakers do not perceive these as mixtures, but instead as local varieties of Russian or Belarusian/Ukrainian.

Russian also has notable lexical similarities with Bulgarian due to a common Church Slavonic influence on both languages, but because of later developments in the 19th and 20th centuries, modern Bulgarian grammar differs markedly from Russian. The use of Church Slavonic as a literary language in the medieval period gave Russian a large number of borrowings and calques ultimately derived from Greek. After the fall of Constantinople in 1453, Russian Orthodoxy became more self-contained, and over time, the Russian recension of Church Slavonic came to influence the Bulgarian and Serbian recensions of Church Slavonic. The influence of Church Slavonic on Russian can still be seen in certain aspects of phonology, grammar, and particularly lexis.

The Old Novgorod dialect, a historical variety of Russian with unique northwestern dialectal features, is sometimes considered to have played a significant role in the formation of modern Russian.

Over the course of centuries, the vocabulary and literary style of Russian have also been influenced by Western and Central European languages such as Greek, Latin, Polish, Dutch, German, French, Italian, and English, and to a lesser extent the languages to the south and the east: Uralic, Turkic, Persian, Arabic, and Hebrew.

According to the Defense Language Institute in Monterey, California, Russian is classified as a level III language in terms of learning difficulty for native English speakers, requiring approximately 1,100 hours of immersion instruction to achieve intermediate fluency.

== Standard Russian ==
Feudal divisions and conflicts created obstacles between the Russian principalities before and especially during Mongol rule. This strengthened dialectal differences, and for a while, prevented the emergence of a standardized national language. The formation of the unified and centralized Russian state in the 15th and 16th centuries, and the gradual re-emergence of a common political, economic, and cultural space created the need for a common standard language. The initial impulse for standardization came from the government bureaucracy for the lack of a reliable tool of communication in administrative, legal, and judicial affairs became an obvious practical problem. The earliest attempts at standardizing Russian were made based on the so-called Moscow official or chancery language, during the 15th to 17th centuries. However, the use of Church Slavonic by the church meant that Russian had a secondary status. By the 17th century, the idea of expanding the use of Russian had emerged when it became clear that Church Slavonic was ill-suited for use in administrative and business matters. Since then, the trend of language policy in Russia has been standardization in both the restricted sense of reducing dialectical barriers between ethnic Russians, and the broader sense of expanding the use of Russian alongside or in favour of other languages.

The current standard form of Russian is generally regarded as the modern Russian literary language (современный русский литературный язык, sovremennyy russkiy literaturnyy yazyk), or Contemporary Standard Russian. It arose at the beginning of the 18th century with the modernization reforms of the Russian state under the rule of Peter the Great and developed from the Moscow dialect substratum under some influence of the Russian chancery language. The Moscow dialect had a northern dialectal base, but after Moscow became the center of a unified state, the attraction of southern dialectal speakers led to the emergence of a transitional dialect group. Peter regarded the standardization of Russian as essential to the development of a modern system of government, education and science, and consequently, to Russia's economic development. By the early 18th century, Russian had replaced Church Slavonic in secular matters. The spread of the Russian literary language was further advanced by a new generation of intellectuals, including Mikhail Lomonosov, who authored the first scientific grammar of Russian and developed a theoretical system of stylistic registers. In addition, he introduced several new literary genres derived from Western European literary traditions. The re-emergence and standardization of Russian for official, administrative, and commercial use laid the foundations for modern Russian.

Prior to the Bolshevik Revolution, the spoken form of the Russian language was that of the nobility and the urban bourgeoisie. Russian peasants, the great majority of the population, continued to speak in their own dialects. However, the peasants' speech was never systematically studied, as it was generally regarded by philologists as simply a source of folklore and an object of curiosity. This was acknowledged by the noted Russian dialectologist Nikolai Karinsky, who toward the end of his life wrote: "Scholars of Russian dialects mostly studied phonetics and morphology. Some scholars and collectors compiled local dictionaries. We have almost no studies of lexical material or the syntax of Russian dialects."

After 1917, Marxist linguists had no interest in the multiplicity of peasant dialects and regarded their language as a relic of the rapidly disappearing past that was not worthy of scholarly attention. Nakhimovsky quotes the Soviet academicians A. M. Ivanov and L. P. Yakubinsky, writing in 1930:

The language of peasants has a motley diversity inherited from feudalism. On its way to becoming proletariat peasantry brings to the factory and the industrial plant their local peasant dialects with their phonetics, grammar, and vocabulary, and the very process of recruiting workers from peasants and the mobility of the worker population generate another process: the liquidation of peasant inheritance by way of leveling the particulars of local dialects. On the ruins of peasant multilingual, in the context of developing heavy industry, a qualitatively new entity can be said to emerge—the general language of the working class... capitalism has the tendency of creating the general urban language of a given society.

== Geographic distribution ==
Hemisphere view of countries where Russian is an official language and countries where it is spoken as a first or second language by at least 30% of the population but is not an official language

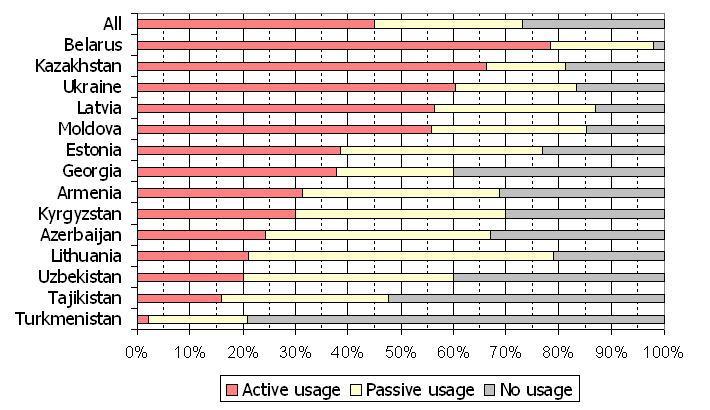
Competence of Russian in countries of the former Soviet Union (except Russia), 2004

In 2010, there were 259.8 million speakers of Russian in the world: in Russia – 137.5 million, in the CIS and Baltic countries – 93.7 million, in Eastern Europe – 12.9 million, Western Europe – 7.3 million, Asia – 2.7 million, in the Middle East and North Africa – 1.3 million, Sub-Saharan Africa – 0.1 million, Latin America – 0.2 million, U.S., Canada, Australia, and New Zealand – 4.1 million speakers. Therefore, the Russian language is the seventh-largest in the world by the number of speakers, after English, Mandarin, Hindi-Urdu, Spanish, French, Arabic, and Portuguese.

Russian is one of the six official languages of the United Nations. Education in Russian is still a popular choice for both Russian as a second language (RSL) and native speakers in Russia, and in many former Soviet republics. Russian is still seen as an important language for children to learn in most of the former Soviet republics.

=== Europe ===
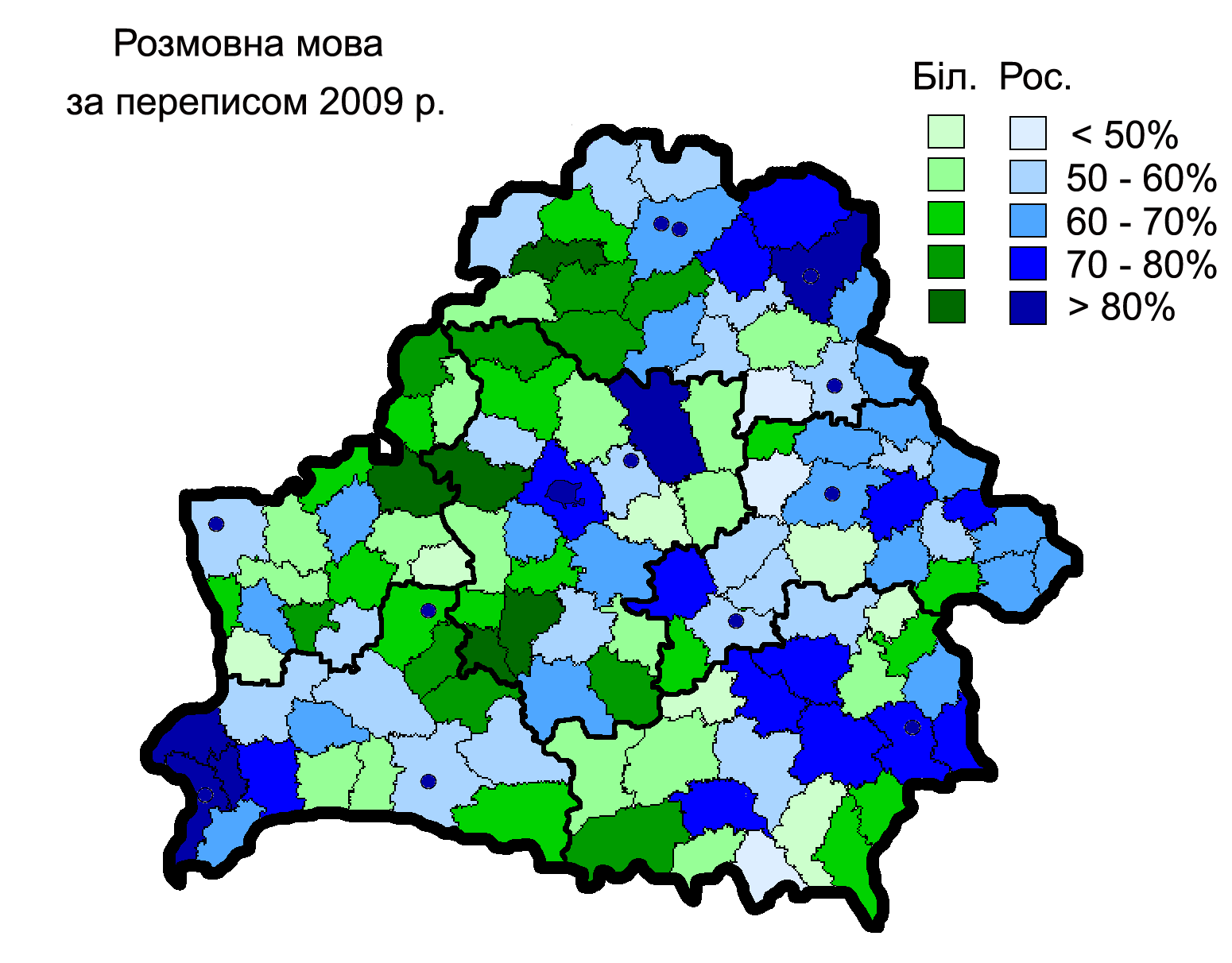
Languages spoken at home in Belarus (according to the 2009 Belarusian census) (green — Belarusian, blue — Russian) (by raion)

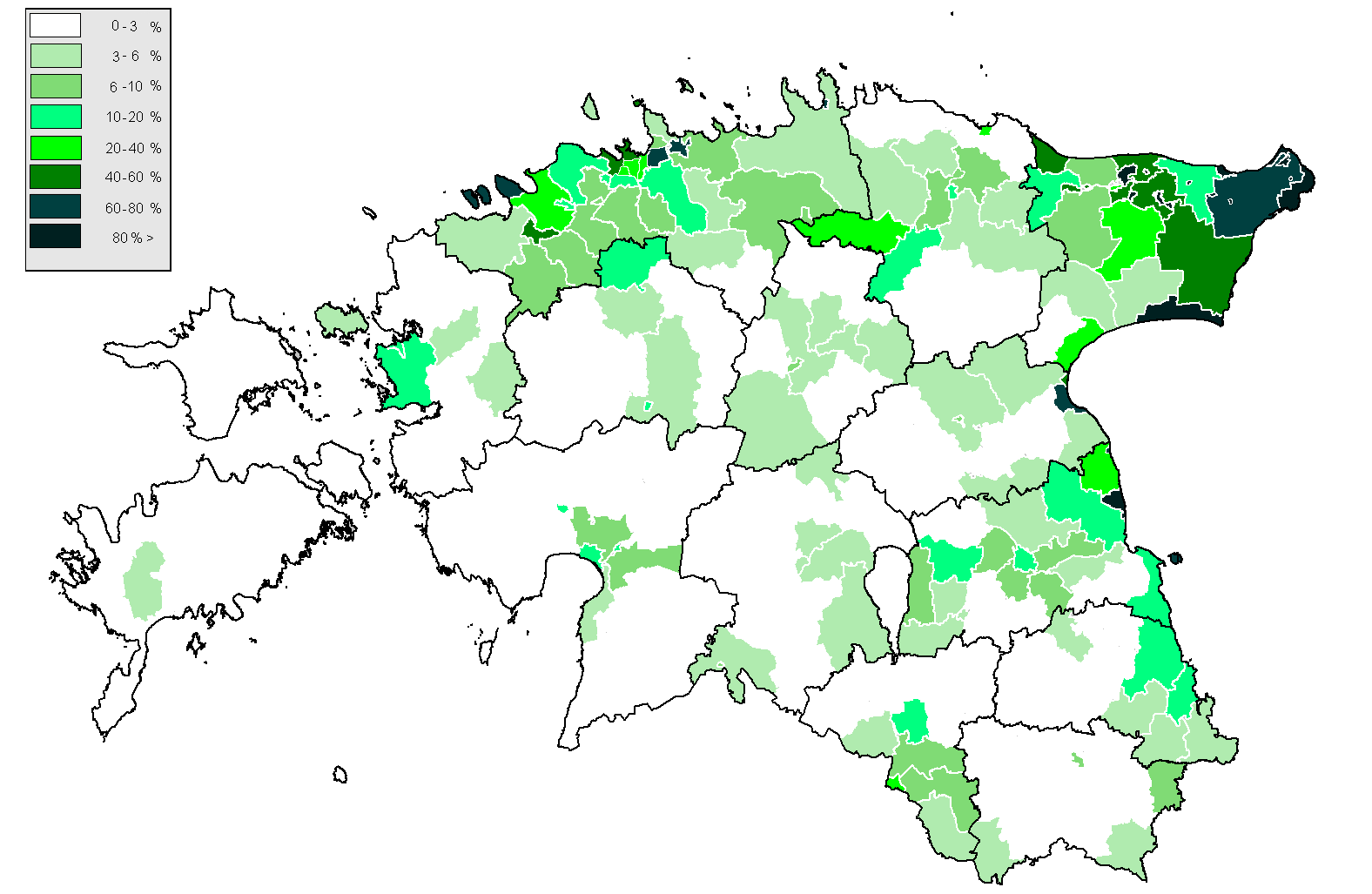
Percentage of Russian speakers in Estonia (according to the 2000 Estonian census)

Percentage of Russian speakers in different regions of Latvia (according to the 2011 census)

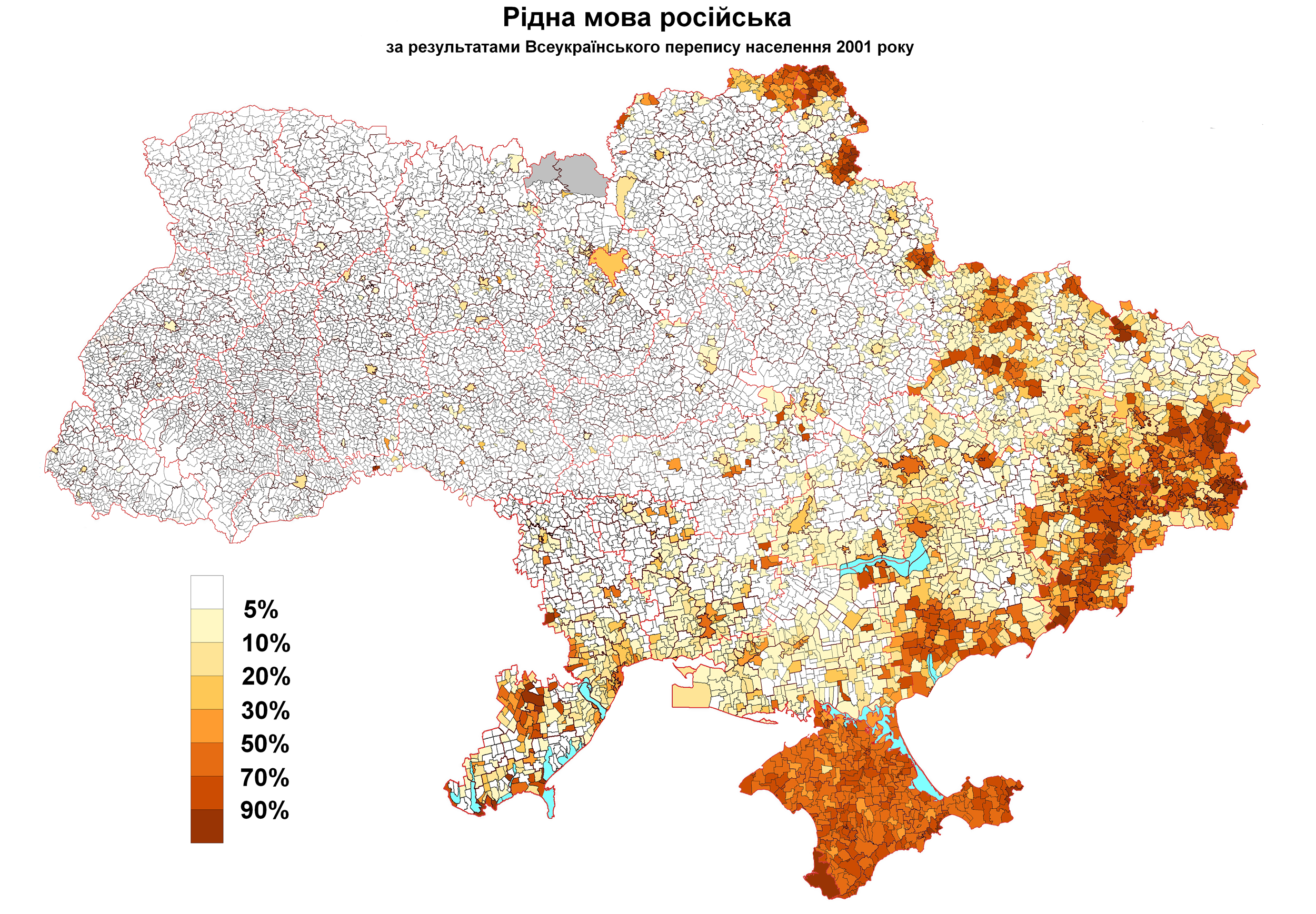
Percentage of people in Ukraine with Russian as their native language (according to the 2001 Ukrainian census)

In Belarus, Russian is a second state language alongside Belarusian per the Constitution of Belarus. 77% of the population was fluent in Russian in 2006, and 67% used it as the main language with family, friends, or at work. According to the 2019 Belarusian census, out of 9,413,446 inhabitants of the country, 5,094,928 (54.1% of the total population) named Belarusian as their native language, with 61.2% of ethnic Belarusians and 54.5% of ethnic Poles declaring Belarusian as their native language. In everyday life in the Belarusian society the Russian language prevails, so according to the 2019 census 6,718,557 people (71.4% of the total population) stated that they speak Russian at home, for ethnic Belarusians this share is 61.4%, for Russians — 97.2%, for Ukrainians — 89.0%, for Poles — 52.4%, and for Jews — 96.6%; 2,447,764 people (26.0% of the total population) stated that the language they usually speak at home is Belarusian, among ethnic Belarusians this share is 28.5%; the highest share of those who speak Belarusian at home is among ethnic Poles — 46.0%.

In Estonia, Russian is spoken by 29.6% of the population, according to a 2011 estimate from the World Factbook, and is officially considered a foreign language. School education in the Russian language is a very contentious point in Estonian politics, and in 2022, the parliament approved a bill to phase out Russian-language schooling and transition completely to Estonian-medium education in all schools and kindergartens by 2030. The transition to only Estonian-language schools and kindergartens began in the 2024–2025 school year.

In Latvia, Russian is officially considered a foreign language. 55% of the population was fluent in Russian in 2006, and 26% used it as the main language with family, friends, or at work. On 18 February 2012, Latvia held a constitutional referendum on whether to adopt Russian as a second official language. According to the Central Election Commission, 74.8% voted against, 24.9% voted for and the voter turnout was 71.1%. Starting in 2019, instruction in Russian was gradually discontinued in private colleges and universities in Latvia, and in general instruction in Latvian public high schools. On 29 September 2022, Saeima passed in the final reading amendments that state that all schools and kindergartens in the country are to transition to education in Latvian. From 2025, all children are taught in Latvian only. On 28 September 2023, Latvian deputies approved The National Security Concept, according to which from 1 January 2026, all content created by Latvian public media (including LSM) should be only in Latvian or a language that "belongs to the European cultural space". The financing of Russian-language content by the state will cease, which the concept says create a "unified information space". However, one inevitable consequence would be the closure of public media broadcasts in Russian on LTV and Latvian Radio, as well as the closure of LSM's Russian-language service.

In Lithuania, Russian has no official or legal status, but the use of the language has some presence in certain areas. A large part of the population, especially the older generations, can speak Russian as a foreign language. However, English has replaced Russian as a second language in Lithuania and around 80% of young people speak English as their first foreign language. In contrast to the other two Baltic states, Lithuania has a relatively small Russian-speaking minority (5.0% as of 2008). According to the 2011 Lithuanian census, Russian was the native language for 7.2% of the population.

In Moldova, Russian was considered to be the language of interethnic communication under a Soviet-era law. On 21 January 2021, the Constitutional Court of Moldova declared the law unconstitutional and deprived Russian of the status of language of interethnic communication. 50% of the population was fluent in Russian in 2006, and 19% used it as the main language with family, friends, or at work. According to the 2014 Moldovan census, Russians accounted for 4.1% of Moldova's population, 9.4% of the population declared Russian as their native language, and 14.5% said they usually spoke Russian.

According to the 2010 census in Russia, Russian language skills were indicated by 138 million people (99.4% of the respondents), while according to the 2002 census – 142.6 million people (99.2% of the respondents).

In Ukraine, Russian is a significant minority language. According to estimates from Demoskop Weekly, in 2004 there were 14,400,000 native speakers of Russian in the country, and 29 million active speakers. 65% of the population was fluent in Russian in 2006, and 38% used it as the main language with family, friends, or at work. On 5 September 2017, Ukraine's Parliament passed a new education law which requires all schools to teach at least partially in Ukrainian, with provisions that allow indigenous languages and languages of national minorities to be used alongside the national language. The law faced criticism from officials in Russia and Hungary. The 2019 Law of Ukraine "On protecting the functioning of the Ukrainian language as the state language" gives priority to the Ukrainian language in more than 30 spheres of public life: in particular in public administration, media, education, science, culture, advertising, and services. The law does not regulate private communication. A poll conducted in March 2022 by RATING in the territory controlled by Ukraine found that 83% of the respondents believe that Ukrainian should be the only state language of Ukraine. This opinion dominates in all macro-regions, age and language groups. On the other hand, before the war, almost a quarter of Ukrainians were in favour of granting Russian the status of the state language, while after the beginning of Russia's invasion the support for the idea dropped to just 7%. In peacetime, the idea of raising the status of Russian was traditionally supported by residents of the south and east. But even in these regions, only a third of the respondents were in favour, and after the 2022 Russian invasion of Ukraine, their number dropped by almost half. According to the survey carried out by RATING in August 2023 in the territory controlled by Ukraine and among the refugees, almost 60% of the polled usually speak Ukrainian at home, about 30% – Ukrainian and Russian, only 9% – Russian. Since March 2022, the use of Russian in everyday life has been noticeably decreasing. For 82% of respondents, Ukrainian is their mother tongue, and for 16%, Russian is their mother tongue. IDPs and refugees living abroad are more likely to use both languages for communication or speak Russian. Nevertheless, more than 70% of IDPs and refugees consider Ukrainian to be their native language.

In the 20th century, Russian was a mandatory language taught in the schools of the members of the old Warsaw Pact and in other countries that used to be satellites of the USSR. According to the Eurobarometer 2005 survey, fluency in Russian remains fairly high (20–40%) in some countries, in particular former Warsaw Pact countries.

=== Caucasus ===
In Armenia, Russian has no official status, but it is recognized as a minority language under the Framework Convention for the Protection of National Minorities. 30% of the population was fluent in Russian in 2006, and 2% used it as the main language with family, friends, or at work.

In Azerbaijan, Russian has no official status, but is a lingua franca of the country. 26% of the population was fluent in Russian in 2006, and 5% used it as the main language with family, friends, or at work.

In Georgia, Russian has no official status. Georgian is the state language under the Constitution of Georgia, while Abkhaz is also an official language within the Autonomous Republic of Abkhazia. Russian-speaking persons belonging to national minorities are protected under the Council of Europe's Framework Convention for the Protection of National Minorities, although the Convention does not designate Russian as a recognized minority language. According to the 2024 Population Census, 54,460 people (around 1.4% of the population) reported Russian as their mother tongue. Russian nevertheless remains widely understood as a second language, particularly among older generations educated during the Soviet period. Since Georgia regained independence in 1991, Georgian has become the dominant language of public administration, education, and media, while English has increasingly become the primary foreign language among younger generations. Russian continues to be used in some business, tourism, and communication with visitors from other post-Soviet countries, but it has no official status and is not a language of government administration.

=== Asia ===
In China, Russian has no official status, but it is spoken by the small Russian communities in the northeastern Heilongjiang and the northwestern Xinjiang Uyghur Autonomous Region. Russian was also the main foreign language taught in school in China between 1949 and 1964.

In Kazakhstan, Russian is not a state language, but according to article 7 of the Constitution of Kazakhstan its usage enjoys equal status to that of the Kazakh language in state and local administration. The 2009 census reported that 10,309,500 people, or 84.8% of the population aged 15 and above, could read and write well in Russian, and understand the spoken language. In October 2023, Kazakhstan drafted a media law aimed at increasing the use of the Kazakh language over Russian; the law stipulates that the share of the state language on television and radio should increase from 50% to 70%, at a rate of 5% per year, starting in 2025.

In Kyrgyzstan, Russian is a co-official language per article 5 of the Constitution of Kyrgyzstan. The 2009 census states that 482,200 people speak Russian as a native language, or 8.99% of the population. Additionally, 1,854,700 residents of Kyrgyzstan aged 15 and above fluently speak Russian as a second language, or 49.6% of the population in the age group.

In Tajikistan, Russian is designated as the language of inter-ethnic communication under the Constitution of Tajikistan and is permitted in official documentation. 28% of the population was fluent in Russian in 2006, and 7% used it as the main language with family, friends or at work. The World Factbook notes that Russian is widely used in government and business.

In Turkmenistan, Russian lost its status as the official lingua franca in 1996. Only about 12% of the population, predominantly those who grew up during the Soviet era, speak Russian; among younger generations, proficiency has sharply declined. Primary and secondary education in Russian is almost non-existent.

In Uzbekistan, Russian is spoken by 14.2% of the population according to an undated estimate from the World Factbook.

In 2005, Russian was the most widely taught foreign language in Mongolia, and was compulsory in Year 7 onward as a second foreign language in 2006.

Around 1.5 million Israelis (ca. 15% of the population) spoke Russian as of 2017. The Israeli press and websites regularly publish material in Russian and there are Russian newspapers, television stations, schools, and social media outlets based in the country. There is an Israeli TV channel mainly broadcasting in Russian with Israel Plus. See also Russian language in Israel.

Russian is also spoken as a second language by a small number of people in Afghanistan.

In Vietnam, Russian has been added in the elementary curriculum along with Chinese and Japanese and were named as "first foreign languages" for Vietnamese students to learn, on equal footing with English.

=== North America ===
The Russian language was first introduced in North America when Russian explorers voyaged into Alaska and claimed it for Russia during the 18th century. Although most Russian colonists left after the United States bought the land in 1867, a handful stayed and preserved the Russian language in this region to this day, although only a few elderly speakers of this unique dialect are left. In Nikolaevsk, Alaska, Russian is more spoken than English. Sizable Russian-speaking communities also exist in North America, especially in large urban centers of the US and Canada, such as New York City, Philadelphia, Boston, Los Angeles, Nashville, San Francisco, Seattle, Spokane, Toronto, Calgary, Baltimore, Miami, Portland, Chicago, Denver, and Cleveland. In a number of locations they issue their own newspapers, and live in ethnic enclaves (especially the generation of immigrants who started arriving in the early 1960s). Only about 25% of them are ethnic Russians, however. Before the dissolution of the Soviet Union, the overwhelming majority of Russophones in Brighton Beach, Brooklyn in New York City were Russian-speaking Jews. Afterward, the influx from the countries of the former Soviet Union changed the statistics somewhat, with ethnic Russians and Ukrainians immigrating along with some more Russian Jews and Central Asians. According to the United States Census, in 2007 Russian was the primary language spoken in the homes of over 850,000 individuals living in the United States.

== As an international language ==
Russian is one of the official languages (or has similar status and interpretation must be provided into Russian) of the following:

- United Nations
- International Atomic Energy Agency
- World Health Organization
- International Civil Aviation Organization
- UNESCO
- World Intellectual Property Organization
- International Telecommunication Union
- World Meteorological Organization
- Food and Agriculture Organization
- International Fund for Agricultural Development
- International Criminal Court
- International Olympic Committee
- Universal Postal Union
- World Bank
- Commonwealth of Independent States
- Organization for Security and Co-operation in Europe
- Shanghai Cooperation Organisation
- Eurasian Economic Union
- Collective Security Treaty Organization
- Antarctic Treaty Secretariat
- International Organization for Standardization
- International Mathematical Olympiad

The Russian language is also one of two official languages aboard the International Space Station – NASA astronauts who serve alongside Russian cosmonauts usually take Russian language courses. This practice goes back to the Apollo–Soyuz mission, which first flew in 1975.

In March 2013, Russian was found to be the second-most used language on websites after English. Russian was the language of 5.9% of all websites, slightly ahead of German and far behind English (54.7%). Russian was used not only on 89.8% of .ru sites, but also on 88.7% of sites with the former Soviet Union domain .su. Websites in former Soviet Union member states also used high levels of Russian: 79.0% in Ukraine, 86.9% in Belarus, 84.0% in Kazakhstan, 79.6% in Uzbekistan, 75.9% in Kyrgyzstan and 81.8% in Tajikistan. However, Russian was the sixth-most used language on the top 1,000 sites, behind English, Chinese, French, German, and Japanese.

On 13 October 2023, the CIS Council of Heads of State signed the Treaty on the Establishment of the International Organization for the Russian Language and adopted the Statement on Support and Promotion of the Russian Language as a Language of Interethnic Communication.

== Dialects ==
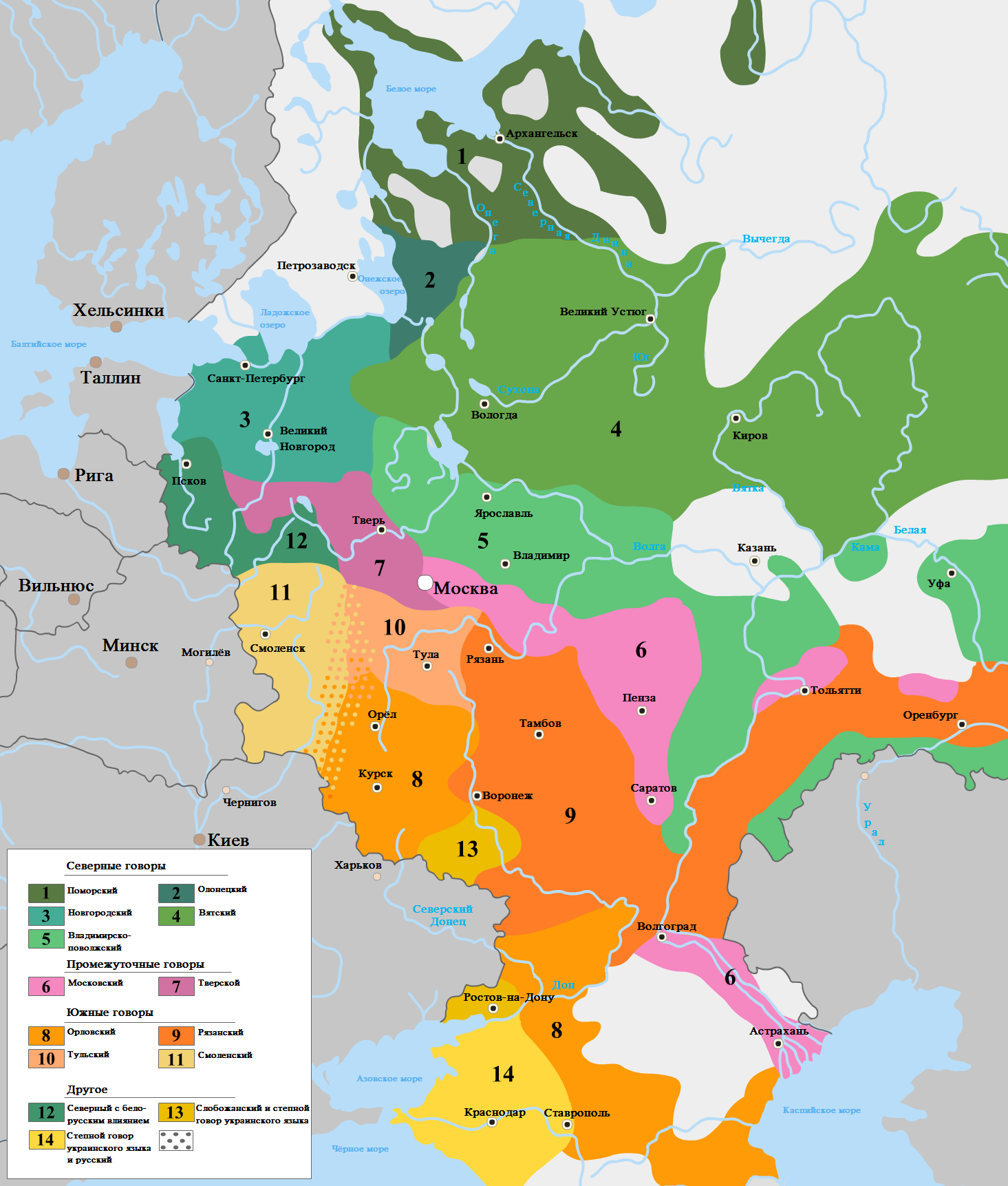
Russian dialects in 1915: Northern dialects: 1. Arkhangelsk dialect; 2. Olonets dialect; 3. Novgorod dialect; 4. Viatka dialect; 5. Vladimir dialect / Central dialects: 6. Moscow dialect; 7. Tver dialect; Southern dialects: 8. Orel (Don) dialect; 9. Ryazan dialect; 10. Tula dialect; 11. Smolensk dialect; Other: 12. Northern Russian dialect with Belarusian influences; 13. Slobozhan and Steppe dialects of Ukrainian; 14. Steppe dialect of Ukrainian with Russian influences (Balachka)

Despite leveling after 1900, especially in matters of vocabulary and phonetics, a number of dialects still exist in Russia. Some linguists divide the dialects of Russian into two primary regional groupings, "Northern" and "Southern", with Moscow lying on the zone of transition between the two. Others divide the language into three groupings, Northern, Central (or Middle), and Southern, with Moscow lying in the Central region.

The Northern Russian dialects and those spoken along the Volga River typically pronounce unstressed /o/ clearly, a phenomenon called okanye (оканье). Besides the absence of vowel reduction, some dialects have high or diphthongal /e⁓i̯ɛ/ in place of *ě and /o⁓u̯ɔ/ in stressed closed syllables (as in Ukrainian) instead of Standard Russian /e/ and /o/, respectively. Another Northern dialectal morphological feature is a post-posed definite article -to, -ta, -te similar to that existing in Bulgarian and Macedonian.

In the Southern Russian dialects, instances of unstressed /e/ and /a/ following palatalized consonants and preceding a stressed syllable are not reduced to [ɪ] (as occurs in the Moscow dialect), being instead pronounced [a] in such positions (e.g. несли is pronounced [nʲaˈslʲi], not [nʲɪsˈlʲi]) – this is called yakanye (яканье). Consonants include a fricative /ɣ/, a semivowel /w⁓u̯/ and /x⁓xv⁓xw/, whereas the Standard and Northern dialects have the consonants /ɡ/, /v/, and final /l/ and /f/, respectively. The morphology features a palatalized final /tʲ/ in 3rd person forms of verbs (this is unpalatalized in the Standard and Northern dialects).

== Comparison with other Slavic languages ==
During the Proto-Slavic (Common Slavic) times all Slavs spoke one mutually intelligible language or group of dialects. There is a high degree of mutual intelligibility between Russian, Belarusian and Ukrainian, and a moderate degree of it in all modern Slavic languages, at least at the conversational level.

== Derived languages ==
- Balachka, a Ukrainian dialect spoken in Krasnodar region, Don, Kuban, and Terek, brought by relocated Cossacks in 1793 and is based on the so-called "southwest Russian" dialect (Ukrainian dialect). During the Russification of the aforementioned regions in the 1920s to 1950s, it was replaced by the Russian language.
- Esperanto has some words of Russian and Slavic origin and some features of its grammar could be derived from Russian.
- Fenya, a criminal argot of ancient origin, with Russian grammar, but with distinct vocabulary
- Lojban: Russian is one of its six source languages, weighed for the number of Russian speakers in 1985.
- Medny Aleut language, an extinct mixed language that was spoken on Bering Island and is characterized by its Aleut nouns and Russian verbs
- Padonkaffsky jargon, a slang language developed by padonki of Runet
- Quelia, a macaronic language with Russian-derived basic structure and part of the lexicon (mainly nouns and verbs) borrowed from German
- Runglish, a Russian-English pidgin. This word is also used by English speakers to describe the way in which Russians attempt to speak English using Russian morphology or syntax.
- Russenorsk, an extinct pidgin language with mostly Russian vocabulary and mostly Norwegian grammar, used for communication between Russians and Norwegian traders in the Pomor trade in Finnmark and the Kola Peninsula
- Surzhyk, a range of mixed (macaronic) sociolects of Ukrainian and Russian languages used in certain regions of Ukraine and adjacent lands.
- Trasianka, a heavily russified variety of Belarusian used by a large portion of the rural population in Belarus
- Taimyr Pidgin Russian, spoken by the Nganasan on the Taimyr Peninsula
- Alaskan Russian, an isolated contact variety and dialect of Russian spoken in some parts of the US state of Alaska

== Alphabet ==
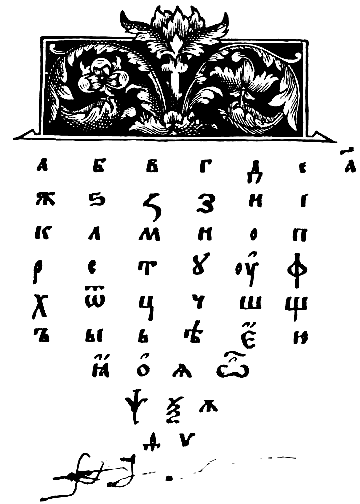
A page from Azbuka ('Alphabet book'), the first East Slavic printed textbook. Printed by Ivan Fyodorov in 1574 in Lviv. This page features the Cyrillic script.

Russian is written using a Cyrillic alphabet. The early Cyrillic alphabet was adapted to Russian from Old Church Slavonic. The first attempt at reforming Russian orthography was carried out in 1708–1710. The last major reform was carried out in 1917–1918.

The Russian alphabet consists of 33 letters. The following table gives their forms, along with IPA values for each letter's typical sound:

Аа /a/	Бб /b/	Вв /v/	Гг /ɡ/	Дд /d/	Ее /je/	Ёё /jo/	Жж /ʐ/	Зз /z/	Ии /i/	Йй /j/
Кк /k/	Лл /l/	Мм /m/	Нн /n/	Оо /o/	Пп /p/	Рр /r/	Сс /s/	Тт /t/	Уу /u/	Фф /f/
Хх /x/	Цц /ts/	Чч /tɕ/	Шш /ʂ/	Щщ /ɕː/	Ъъ /-/	Ыы /ɨ/	Ьь /ʲ/	Ээ /e/	Юю /ju/	Яя /ja/

Older letters of the Russian alphabet include yat ⟨ѣ⟩, which merged to ⟨е⟩ (/je/ or /ʲe/); ⟨і⟩ and ⟨ѵ⟩, which both merged to ⟨и⟩ (/i/); ⟨ѳ⟩, which merged to ⟨ф⟩ (/f/); ⟨ѫ⟩, which merged to ⟨у⟩ (/u/); ⟨ѭ⟩, which merged to ⟨ю⟩ (/ju/ or /ʲu/); and ⟨ѧ⟩ and ⟨ѩ⟩, which later were graphically reshaped into ⟨я⟩ and merged phonetically to /ja/ or /ʲa/. While these older letters have been abandoned at one time or another, they may be used in this and related articles. The yers ⟨ъ⟩ and ⟨ь⟩ originally indicated the pronunciation of ultra-short or reduced /ŭ/, /ĭ/.

=== Transliteration ===
Because of many technical restrictions in computing and also because of the unavailability of Cyrillic keyboards abroad, Russian is often transliterated using the Latin alphabet. For example, мороз ('frost') is transliterated moroz, and мышь ('mouse'), mysh or myš'. Once commonly used by the majority of those living outside Russia, transliteration is being used less frequently by Russian-speaking typists in favor of the extension of Unicode character encoding, which fully incorporates the Russian alphabet. Free programs are available offering this Unicode extension, which allow users to type Russian characters, even on Western 'QWERTY' keyboards.

=== Computing ===
The Russian language was first introduced to computing after the M-1, and MESM models were produced in 1951.

=== Orthography ===
According to the Institute of Russian Language of the Russian Academy of Science, an optional acute accent (знак ударения) may, and sometimes should, be used to mark stress. For example, it is used

to distinguish between otherwise identical words, especially when context does not make it obvious:

замо́к (zamók – "lock") – за́мок (zámok – "castle"),

сто́ящий (stóyashchy – "worthwhile") – стоя́щий (stoyáshchy – "standing"),

чудно́ (chudnó – "this is odd") – чу́дно (chúdno – "this is marvellous"),

молоде́ц (molodéts – "well done!") – мо́лодец (mólodets – "fine young man"),

узна́ю (uznáyu – "I shall learn it") – узнаю́ (uznayú – "I recognize it"),

отреза́ть (otrezát – "to be cutting") – отре́зать (otrézat – "to have cut");

to indicate the proper pronunciation of uncommon words, especially personal and family names, like

афе́ра (aféra, "scandal, affair"),

гу́ру (gúru, "guru"), Гарси́я (García),

Оле́ша (Olésha), Фе́рми (Fermi),

and to show which is the stressed word in a sentence, for example

Ты́ съел печенье? (Tý syel pechenye? – "Was it you who ate the cookie?") –

Ты съе́л печенье? (Ty syél pechenye? – "Did you eat the cookie?) –

Ты съел пече́нье? (Ty syel pechénye? "Was it the cookie you ate?").

Stress marks are mandatory in lexical dictionaries and books for children or Russian learners.

== Phonology ==
The Russian syllable structure can be quite complex, with both initial and final consonant clusters of up to four consecutive sounds. Using a formula with V standing for the nucleus (vowel) and C for each consonant, the maximal structure can be described as follows:

(C)(C)(C)(C)V(C)(C)(C)(C)

=== Consonants ===
Consonant phonemes
		Labial		Alveolar /Dental		Post- alveolar		Palatal	Velar	
		plain	pal.	plain	pal.	plain	pal.	Palatal	plain	pal.
Nasal		m	mʲ	n	nʲ					
Stop	voiceless	p	pʲ	t					k	kʲ
Stop	voiced	b	bʲ	d					ɡ	ɡʲ
Affricate	voiceless			t͡s	(t͡sʲ)		t͡ɕ			
Affricate	voiced			(dz)	(dzʲ)	(dʐ)				
Fricative	voiceless	f	fʲ	s	sʲ	ʂ	ɕ(ː)		x	xʲ
Fricative	voiced	v	vʲ	z	zʲ	ʐ	(ʑː)		(ɣ)	(ɣʲ)
Approximant				l	lʲ			j		
Trill				r	rʲ					

Russian is notable for its distinction based on palatalization of most of its consonants. The phoneme /ts/ is generally considered to be always hard; however, loan words such as Цюрих and some other neologisms contain /tsʲ/ through the word-building processes (e.g., фрицёнок ["фриц" plus diminutive "ёнок"], шпицята ["шпиц" plus diminutive "ята"]). Palatalization means that the center of the tongue is raised toward the palate during and after the articulation of the consonant. In the case of /tʲ/ and /dʲ/, the tongue is raised enough to produce slight frication (affricate sounds; cf. Belarusian ць, дзь, or Polish ć, dź). The sounds /t, d, ts, s, z, n, rʲ/ are dental (or rather, denti-alveolar), that is, pronounced with the tip of the tongue against the teeth rather than against the alveolar ridge. According to some linguists, the "plain" consonants are velarized as in Irish, something which is most noticeable when it involves a labial before a hard vowel, such as мы, /mˠɨː/, "we", or бэ, /bˠɛ/, "the letter Б".

=== Vowels ===
	Front	Central	Back
Close	i	(ɨ)	u
Mid	e		o
Open		a	

Russian vowel chart by Trofimov & Jones (1923:55)

Russian has five or six vowels in stressed syllables, /i, u, e, o, a/, and in some analyses /ɨ/, but in most cases these vowels have merged to only two to four vowels when unstressed: /i, u, a/ (or /ɨ, u, a/) after hard consonants and /i, u/ after soft ones. These vowels have several allophones, which are displayed on the diagram to the right.

== Grammar ==
Russian has preserved an Indo-European synthetic-inflectional structure, although considerable leveling has occurred. Russian grammar encompasses:

- a highly inflectional fusional morphology;
- the former allows for an unusually flexible word order in a sentence, although the subject–verb–object word order is preferred in the neutral style of speech. Some studies found that in modern Russian vernacular the chance that a transitive Russian sentence is judged "SVO" fluctuates between 40% and 45%; the rest are split among subject-object-verb, verb-initial orders and right dislocations, that are used to signal information-structure or stylistic factors.
- a preference for adjective-before-noun syntax;
- a lexicon that, for the literary language, is the conscious fusion of three elements:
  - a polished East Slavic vernacular foundation;
  - a significant Church Slavonic lexical and stylistic heritage;
  - Western European stylistic and lexical influences.

The spoken language has been influenced by the literary one but continues to preserve characteristic forms. The dialects show various non-standard grammatical features.

In terms of actual grammar, there are three verb tenses in Russian – past, present, and future – and each verb has one of the two aspects (perfective and imperfective). Verbs of motion in Russian – such as 'go', 'walk', 'run', 'swim', and 'fly' – use the imperfective or perfective form to indicate a single or return trip. Also, unlike the English verbs, that use post-positions to clarify the verb's meaning (e.g. "go out"), Russian verbs use a multitude of prefixes to add shades of meaning to the verb (e.g "выходить" ). Such verbs also take on different forms to distinguish between concrete and abstract motion.

Russian nouns and adjectives (and even verbs, although in the past tense only) each have a gender – either feminine, masculine, or neuter, chiefly indicated by an inflection at the end of the word. Words change depending on both their gender and function in the sentence.

Russian has six cases for nouns, personal pronouns and adjectives: nominative (for the grammatical subject), genitive (to indicate possession, relation or absence), dative (for indirect objects), accusative (for direct objects), instrumental (to indicate 'with' (both instrument and co-participant) or 'by means of'), and prepositional/locative (used only after prepositions, like в "in", на "on", о "about", "in the presence of").

== Vocabulary ==
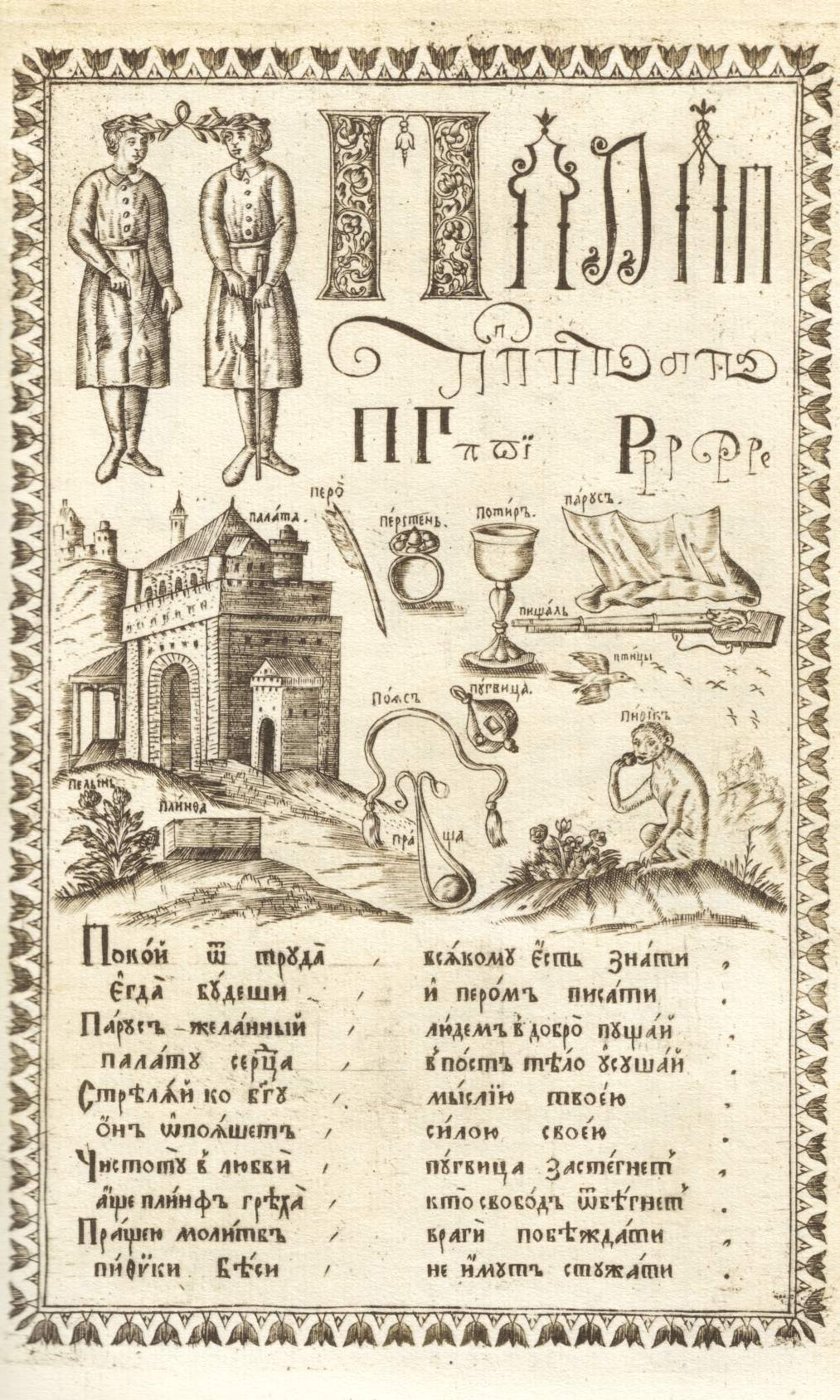
This page from an "ABC" book printed in Moscow in 1694 shows the letter П.

The number of listed words or entries in some of the major dictionaries published during the past two centuries, are as follows:

Work	Year	Words	Notes
Academic dictionary, I Ed.	1789–1794	43,257	Russian and Church Slavonic with some Old Russian vocabulary.
Academic dictionary, II Ed.	1806–1822	51,388	Russian and Church Slavonic with some Old Russian vocabulary.
Academic dictionary, III Ed.	1847	114,749	Russian and Church Slavonic with Old Russian vocabulary.
Explanatory Dictionary of the Living Great Russian Language (Dahl's)	1880–1882	195,844	44,000 entries lexically grouped; attempt to catalogue the full vernacular language. Contains many dialectal, local, and obsolete words.
Explanatory Dictionary of the Russian Language (Ushakov's)	1934–1940	85,289	Current language with some archaisms.
Dictionary of the Russian Language (Ozhegov's)	1949–1992	>70,000–80,000	Standard single-volume explanatory dictionary of modern Russian.
Academic Dictionary of the Russian Language (BAS)	1948–1965; 1991–2023 (2nd ed.)	120,480 (1st ed.) / >150,000 (2nd ed.)	"Full" 17-volume academic dictionary of the contemporary language. The second 20-volume edition was begun in 1991.
Lopatin's dictionary	1999–2013	≈200,000	Orthographic, current language, several editions
Great Explanatory Dictionary of the Russian Language	1998–2009	≈130,000	Current language, the dictionary has many subsequent editions from the first one of 1998.
Russian Wiktionary	11 October 2021	442,533	Number of entries in the category Русский язык (Russian language)

== History and literary language ==
No single periodization is universally accepted. The history of the Russian language is sometimes divided into Old Russian from the 11th to 17th centuries, followed by Modern Russian. It is also sometimes divided into the following periods:

- Old Russian (Note: Russian: древнерусский язык.) (with the earliest forms sometimes referred to as Old East Slavic; until the 13th–14th centuries);
- Middle Russian (Note: Russian: старорусский язык, среднерусский язык.) (14th–15th centuries until the 16th–17th centuries);
- Modern Russian (Note: Russian: современный русский язык.) (17th–18th centuries to the present).

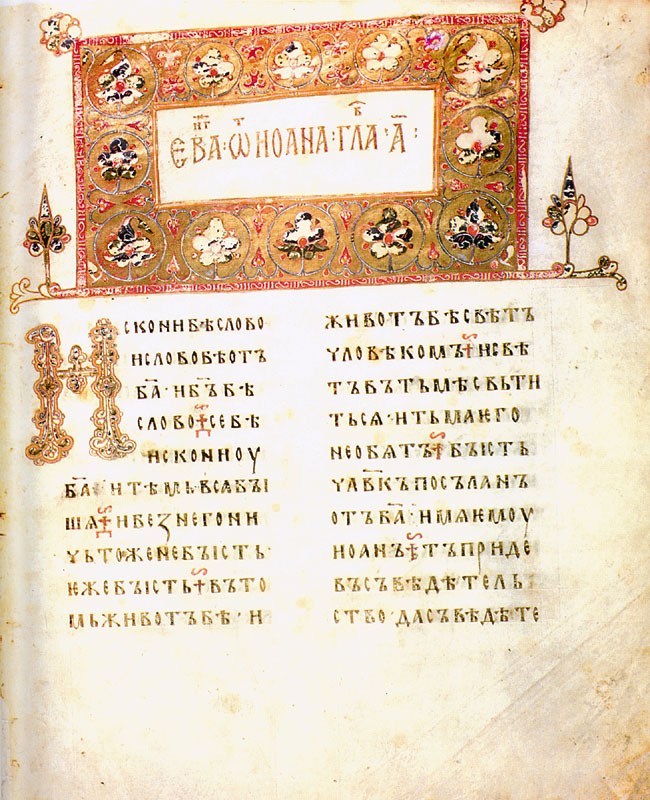
The Ostromir Gospels of 1056–1057 is one of many medieval illuminated manuscripts preserved in the Russian National Library.

The emergence of writing (and thus Old Russian literature) is dated to around the year 1000, after Old Church Slavonic was introduced as the liturgical language in the late 10th century. At this point, the two languages were mutually intelligible, but there were clear East Slavic and South Slavic forms. The modern view is that Church Slavonic and Old Russian were perceived as different registers of the same language. The vernacular was considered the "low variety", while Church Slavonic was considered the "high variety". As a result, the two were in a diglossic relationship, and in the following centuries, Church Slavonic became increasingly Russianized.

Literacy among the Russians initially developed through religious and hagiographical writings. The Ostromir Gospels (1056–1057) are the earliest dated manuscript to contain Russian elements and mark the beginning of Russianized Church Slavonic, which would gradually spread to liturgical, ecclesiastical and chancery texts. The language found in the birch bark manuscripts of the 11th–15th centuries represents the closest approximation to the vernacular Old Russian language, and shows more evidence of a native Russian idiom.

During the rise of Moscow as the political center of Russia in the 14th–16th centuries, the language of the region is sometimes called Great Russian to distinguish it from the territories where the future Belarusian and Ukrainian languages developed. The influx of speakers from the southern dialect areas gave rise to a hybrid dialect, known as the Moscow dialect, and this became the basis of the standard language. During this period, local Russian vernaculars gained increased functionality, especially the Moscow dialect. The Moscow dialect and the chancery language—together sometimes referred to as a koiné—were responsible for the development and spread of implicit norms of usage that later became the norms of Modern Russian. The main phonological development during this period was akanye. However, in the 15th century, a more rigid standard of Church Slavonic replaced the strongly vernacularized language of the 13th and 14th centuries as a result of South Slavic influence. In the following centuries, this development transformed the diglossic situation into one of bilingualism. It was not until the 18th century that Church Slavonic lost its function as the high literary style.

The political reforms of Peter the Great were accompanied by a reform of the alphabet, and achieved their goal of secularization and modernization, but caused a need for a written language that more closely resembled the spoken vernacular. The polymath Mikhail Lomonosov, in his Russian Grammar (1755), defined three styles: the "high style" (i.e. Church Slavonic, which would be used for high poetic genres, in addition to religious texts), the "middle style" (for lyric poetry, literary prose, scientific works), and a "low style" (i.e. a pure vernacular, which would be used for personal correspondence and low comedy). The modern standard language is closest to the middle style.

Blocks of specialized vocabulary were adopted from the languages of Western Europe. By 1800, a significant portion of the gentry spoke French daily, and German sometimes. Many Russian novels of the 19th century, e.g. Leo Tolstoy's War and Peace, contain entire paragraphs and even pages in French with no translation given, with an assumption that educated readers would not need one.

The modern literary language was established by the time of Alexander Pushkin in the first third of the 19th century. Pushkin revolutionized Russian literature by rejecting archaic grammar and vocabulary (the "high style") in favor of grammar and vocabulary found in the spoken language of the time. Even modern readers of younger age may only experience slight difficulties understanding some words in Pushkin's texts, since relatively few words used by Pushkin have become archaic or changed meaning. In fact, many expressions used by Russian writers of the early 19th century, in particular Pushkin, Mikhail Lermontov, Nikolai Gogol, Aleksander Griboyedov, became proverbs or sayings which can be frequently found even in modern Russian colloquial speech.

Winter Evening
Reading of excerpt of Pushkin's "Winter Evening" (Зимний вечер), 1825.

Russian text	Pronunciation	Transliteration	English Translation
Зи́мний ве́чер	[ˈzʲimnʲɪj ˈvʲetɕɪr]	Zímnij véčer	Winter evening
Бу́ря мгло́ю не́бо кро́ет,	[ˈburʲə ˈmɡɫoju ˈnʲɛbə ˈkroɪt]	Búrja mglóju nébo krójet,	The storm covers the sky with a haze
Ви́хри сне́жные крутя́;	[ˈvʲixrʲɪ ˈsʲnʲɛʐnɨɪ krʊˈtʲa]	Víhri snéžnyje krutjá,	As it swirls heaps of snow in the air.
То, как зверь, она́ заво́ет,	[ˈto kaɡ zvʲerʲ ɐˈna zɐˈvoɪt]	To, kak zveŕ, oná zavójet,	At times, it howls like a beast,
То запла́чет, как дитя́,	[ˈto zɐˈpɫatɕɪt, kaɡ dʲɪˈtʲa]	To zapláčet, kak ditjá,	And then cries like a child;
То по кро́вле обветша́лой	[ˈto pɐˈkrovlʲɪ ɐbvʲɪtˈʂaɫəj]	To po króvle obvetšáloj	At times, on top of the threadbare roof,
Вдруг соло́мой зашуми́т,	[ˈvdruk sɐˈɫoməj zəʂʊˈmʲit]	Vdrug solómoj zašumít,	It suddenly rustles straw,
То, как пу́тник запозда́лый,	[ˈto ˈkak ˈputʲnʲɪɡ zəpɐˈzdaɫɨj]	To, kak pútnik zapozdályj	And then, like a late traveller,
К нам в око́шко застучи́т.	[ˈknam vɐˈkoʂkə zəstʊˈtɕit]	K nam v okóško zastučít.	It knocks upon our window.

During the Soviet period, the policy toward the languages of the various other ethnic groups fluctuated in practice. Though each of the constituent republics had its own official language, the unifying role and superior status was reserved for Russian, although it was declared the official language only in 1990. Following the dissolution of the Soviet Union in 1991, several of the newly independent states have encouraged their native languages, which has partly reversed the privileged status of Russian, though its role as the language of post-Soviet national discourse throughout the region has continued.

Recent estimates of the total number of speakers of Russian
Source	Native speakers	Native rank	Total speakers	Total rank
G. Weber, "Top Languages", Language Monthly, 3: 12–18, 1997, ISSN 1369-9733	160,000,000	8	285,000,000	5
World Almanac (1999)	145,000,000	8 (2005)	275,000,000	5
SIL (2000 WCD)	145,000,000	8	255,000,000	5–6 (tied with Arabic)
CIA World Factbook (2005)	160,000,000	8		

According to figures published in 2006 in the journal "Demoskop Weekly" by A. L. Arefyev, research deputy director of the Research Center for Sociological Research of the Ministry of Education and Science, the Russian language is gradually losing its position in the world in general, and in Russia in particular. In 2012, Arefyev published a new study "Russian language at the turn of the 20th–21st centuries", in which he confirmed his conclusion about the trend of weakening of the Russian language after the Soviet Union's collapse in various regions of the world. In the countries of the former Soviet Union the Russian language was being replaced or used in conjunction with local languages. Currently, the number of speakers of Russian in the world depends on the number of Russians in the world and total population in Russia.

The changing proportion of Russian speakers in the world (assessment Aref'eva 2012)
Year	worldwide population, billion	population Russian Empire, Soviet Union and Russian Federation, million	share in world population, %	total number of speakers of Russian, million	share in world population, %
1900	1.650	138.0	8.4	105	6.4
1914	1.782	182.2	10.2	140	7.9
1940	2.342	205.0	8.8	200	7.6
1980	4.434	265.0	6.0	280	6.3
1990	5.263	286.0	5.4	312	5.9
2004	6.400	146.0	2.3	278	4.3
2010	6.820	142.7	2.1	260	3.8
2020	7.794	147.3	1.8	256	3.3

== Sample text ==
Article 1 of the Universal Declaration of Human Rights in Russian

Article 1 of the Universal Declaration of Human Rights in Russian:

Все люди рождаются свободными и равными в своём достоинстве и правах. Они наделены разумом и совестью и должны поступать в отношении друг друга в духе братства.

The romanization of the text into Latin alphabet:

Vse lyudi rozhdayutsya svobodnymi i ravnymi v svoyom dostoinstve i pravakh. Oni nadeleny razumom i sovest'yu i dolzhny postupat' v otnoshenii drug druga v dukhe bratstva.

Article 1 of the Universal Declaration of Human Rights in English:

All human beings are born free and equal in dignity and rights. They are endowed with reason and conscience and should act towards one another in a spirit of brotherhood.

== See also ==
- List of English words of Russian origin
- List of Russian language topics
- List of countries and territories where Russian is an official language
- Computer Russification
