= Middle Russian language =

Historical stage of the Russian language

Middle Russian
- рꙋскїй
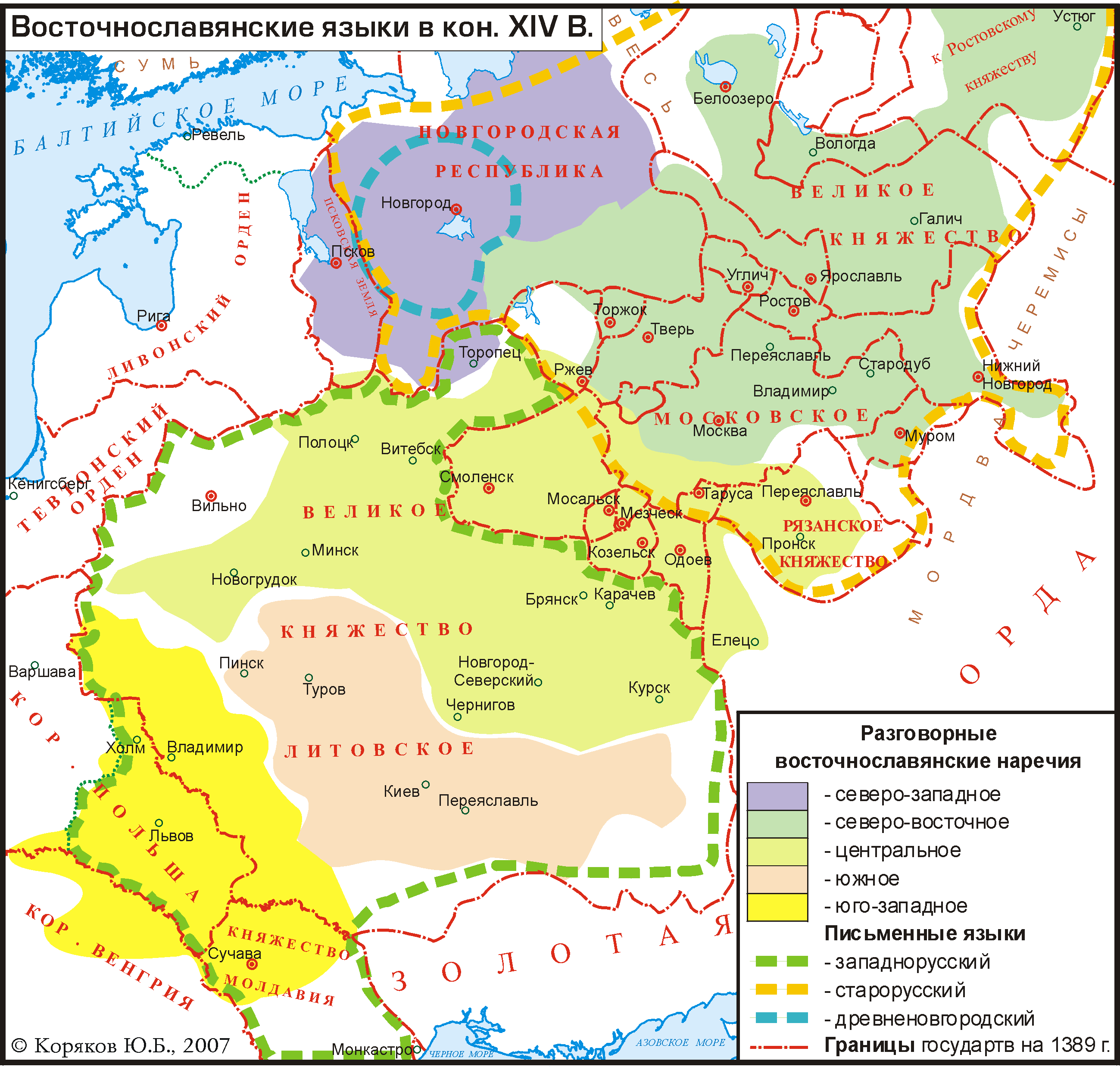
- Middle Russian written language (orange dotted line) at the end of the 14th century
- Native to: Novgorod Republic, Grand Duchy of Moscow, Tsardom of Russia
- Extinct: developed into the modern Russian language
- Language family: Indo-European: Balto-Slavic; Slavic; East Slavic; Middle Russian
- Early forms: Proto-Indo-European: Proto-Balto-Slavic; Proto-Slavic; Old Russian

Language codes
- ISO 639-3: –

Middle Russian is the historical stage of the Russian language that was spoken and written from the 14th to the 17th centuries. It developed following the dialectal fragmentation of Old East Slavic into the distinct Russian and Ruthenian branches, and lasted until the orthographic and literary reforms introduced by Peter the Great.

In Russian scholarly literature, this period is natively referred to as Old Russian (старорусский язык) or Old Great Russian (старовеликорусский язык). In English, "Old Russian" is typically reserved for the preceding Old East Slavic stage (7th–14th centuries) to maintain the chronological distinction between Old, Middle, and Modern Russian. These various terms are primarily used by linguists to classify units of language and determine their historical age or the period of their first written record.

The Middle Russian era is conventionally divided into two distinct subperiods: Early Middle Russian (14th–15th centuries) and Late Middle Russian (16th–17th centuries).

== Context ==
In the history of the Russian language, three main chronological periods are generally distinguished:

- Old Russian: (Note: also called Old East Slavic; древнерусский) the common ancestor of Belarusian, Russian, Rusyn and Ukrainian (7th–14th centuries);
- Middle Russian: (Note: or Old Great Russian; старорусский, старовеликорусский) the stage of the Russian language that chronologically succeeded Old Russian (14th–17th centuries);
- Modern Russian: (Note: русский) the period of the national Russian language (from the early 18th century to the present).

== Linguistic characteristics ==
During this period, the phonetic, morphological, and syntactic systems that closely resemble those of the modern Russian language began to form. Key linguistic changes include:

- the change of е to о after soft consonants before hard ones: [nʲes] > [nʲos] (нёс);
- the final formation of the system of oppositions of hard/soft and voiceless/voiced consonants;
- the analogical leveling of the consonants ц, з, с in declension forms, restoring the original velars к, г, х (рукѣ, ногѣ, сохѣ instead of руцѣ, нозѣ, сосѣ); in the Ukrainian and Belarusian languages, the historical alternations caused by the second palatalization are preserved: Ukrainian: на руці, на нозі; Belarusian: на руцэ, на назе;
- the loss of the category of dual number;
- the loss of the vocative case, which began to be replaced by the nominative case (брат!, сын!); the vocative case is preserved in the Ukrainian language and partly in Belarusian: Ukrainian брате!, сину!; Belarusian браце!;
- the emergence and widespread use of the -а inflection in nouns in the nominative plural (города, дома, учителя) in contrast to its absence in similar forms in Ukrainian and Belarusian (Ukrainian доми, вчителі; Belarusian гарады, дамы, вучыцелі);
- the unification of declension types;
- the change of adjectival endings [-ыи̯], [-ии̯] into [-ои̯], [-еи̯] (простый, сам третий changes into простой, сам трете́й);
- the appearance of imperative mood forms with к, г instead of ц, з through analogical leveling (пеки instead of пеци, помоги instead of помози) and -ите instead of -ѣте (несите instead of несѣте);
- the consolidation in living speech of one form of the past tense of verbs - the former participle ending in -л, which was originally part of the perfect forms;
- the emergence of common Great Russian words such as крестьянин (peasant), мельник (miller), пашня (arable land), деревня (village), and many others.

== Dialects ==
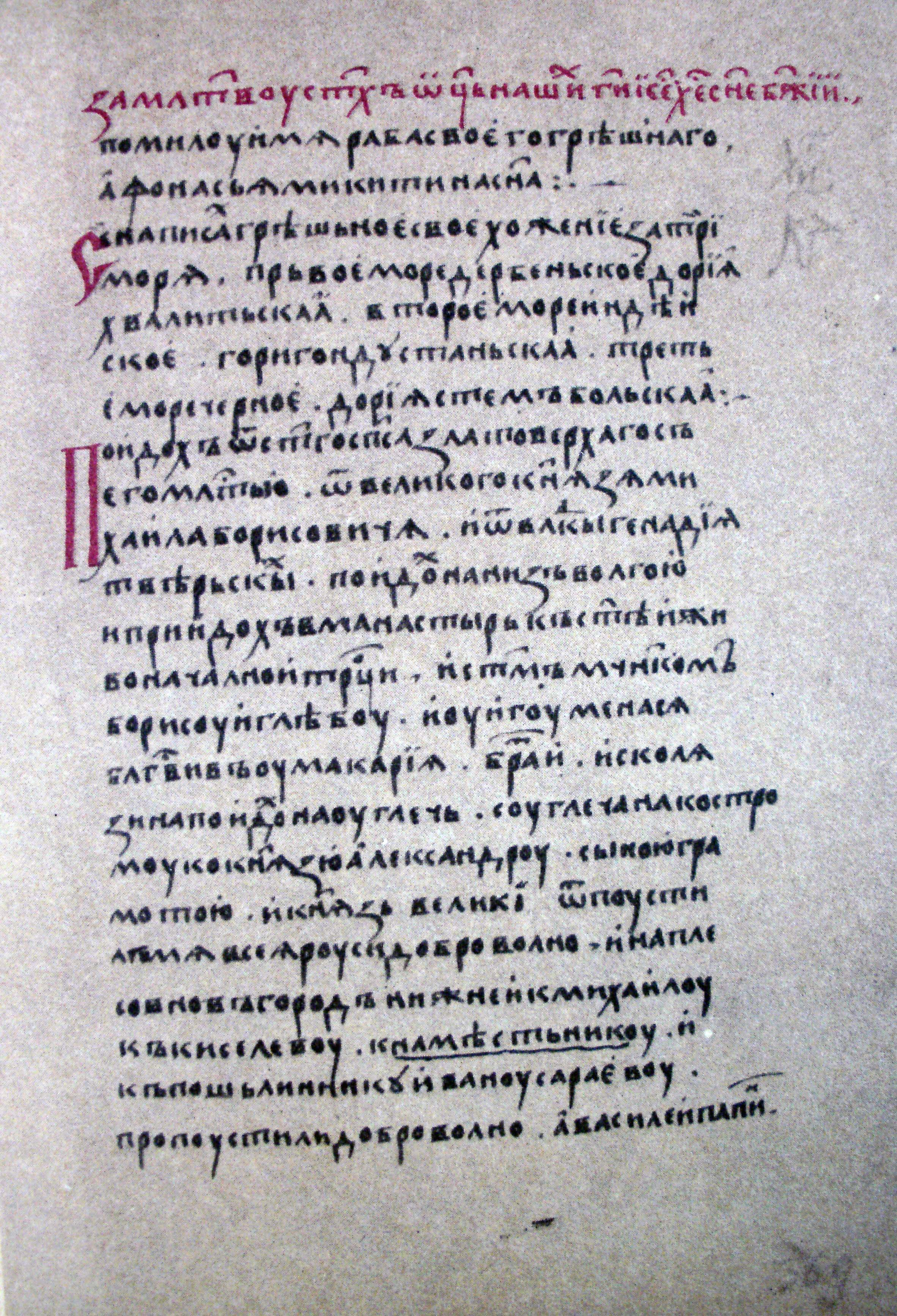
Trinity list (late 15th or early 16th century) of Afanasy Nikitin's "A Journey Beyond the Three Seas"

Among the dialects that developed in the Great Russian territory during the feudal fragmentation (such as Novgorod, Pskov, Smolensk, Rostov-Suzdal, and the akanye dialects of the upper and middle Oka and the Oka-Seym interfluve), the Moscow variety of the Rostov-Suzdal dialect began to rise in prominence in the 14th century.

From the second quarter of the 14th century, Moscow became the political and cultural center of the Great Russian lands, and in the 15th century, vast Russian territories were united under its rule. Based primarily on Moscow dialects, alongside linguistic elements from other Russian regions (Ryazan, Novgorod, etc.), the norms of Moscow colloquial speech gradually developed by the 16th century. They combined northern Russian traits (the explosive consonant г, the hard т in third-person verb endings, etc.) with southern Russian features (akanye, etc.). The Moscow koine became exemplary, spreading to other Russian cities and exerting a strong influence on the written language. The emergence of book printing in the 16th century, which led to the publication of church and civil books in the semi-uncial (poluustav) script, further contributed to linguistic unification. Many official documents and works from the 15th to 17th centuries were written in a language with a Muscovite colloquial basis (such as Afanasy Nikitin's A Journey Beyond the Three Seas, the works of Ivan IV the Terrible, The Tale of Peter and Fevronia of Murom, The Tale of the Capture of Pskov, and various satirical literature).

During the Middle Russian period, the dialectal division of the language evolved. By the 17th century, two large dialectal groupings had formed: the Northern Russian group and the Southern Russian group, separated by transitional Central Russian dialects.

== Written language ==
During the 14th–17th centuries, literary bilingualism gradually replaced the earlier diglossia. The Old Moscow recension of Church Slavonic coexisted with the administrative and literary Russian language, which was more heavily based on the vernacular. Various transitional forms emerged between these two idioms. Contradictory tendencies were observed in literary and linguistic processes: on the one hand, from the late 14th century, literature of various genres began to reflect vernacular speech accessible to broader strata of society; on the other hand, under the so-called second South Slavic influence, the language of many works became increasingly archaic. The resulting bookish "weaving of words" increasingly diverged from everyday speech.

The German philologist Heinrich Wilhelm Ludolf discussed this divide in the introduction to his Grammatica Russica, published at Oxford in 1696, contrasting the Slavic language used for scholarly and liturgical matters with the vernacular Russian needed for everyday conversation. Highly innovative in this regard was the Life of Archpriest Avvakum, written by Avvakum in “natural Russian,” essentially the vernacular of his time. This contrast is evident from comparing the following examples:

Посемъ привезли въ Брацкой острогъ и въ тюрму кинули, соломки дали... Что собачка въ соломкѣ лежу: коли накормятъ, коли нѣтъ. Мышей много было, я ихъ скуфьею билъ, — и батошка не дадутъ, дурачки! Все на брюхѣ лежалъ: спина гнила. Блохъ да вшей было много... А жена зъ дѣтми верстъ зъ дватцеть была сослана отъ меня. Баба ея Ксенья мучила зиму ту всю, — лаяла да укоряла.

— The Life of the Archpriest Avvakum

Такожде и въ сіе наше время благоволи Господь Богъ крѣпкаго нашего самодержца и благохотнаго всѣмъ человѣкомъ и милостиваго царя, гнѣваяся на люди, отняти. Который бы ради своего мудраго разсмотрительства и великаго милосердія, аще не бы его болѣзнь постигла, народное бѣдство всячески бы возможно успокоити. Уже бо въ царствующемъ градѣ гнѣвъ Божій отъ налоговъ начальническихъ и неправедныхъ судовъ возгаратися нача, и мысли у людей такожде начаша развращатися.

— Sylvester Medvedev, Созерцание краткое лет 7190, 91 и 92, в них же что содеяся во гражданстве

The 16th century saw the grammatical normalization of the Muscovite written language. Driven by Moscow's ambition to be viewed as the Third Rome, official business language from the late 15th to early 16th centuries was deliberately archaized and standardized along the lines of literary Slavo-Russian. In high rhetorical styles, artificial neologisms and compound words were formed based on archaic models (e.g., великозлобство, зверообразство, властодержавец).

Church Slavonic orthography was codified in the grammars of Lavrentiy Zizaniy (1596) and Meletius Smotrytsky (1619). A century later, Vasily Trediakovsky, while studying at the Slavic Greek Latin Academy, argued that Smotritsky's attempt to base Russian grammar on formal Greek models contradicted the natural flow of Slavic speech. Although Smotritsky's grammar held sacred status, it required rethinking by the mid-18th century. Before Trediakovsky, Vasily Adodurov initiated this process in his grammar written in the late 1740s.

The official Moscow language, virtually free of Church Slavonicisms, reached a high level of development by the early 17th century. It was used in government documents, legal codes, and almost all correspondence among the Moscow intelligentsia. The southwestern influence emanating from the Polish–Lithuanian Commonwealth brought a flood of Europeanisms into Russian literary speech. In the 17th century, the influence of Latin, the international language of science, grew significantly (e.g., introducing terms like вертикальный, фигура, глобус, градус, дистанция). Polish also served as a major supplier of European scientific, legal, and secular vocabulary.

== See also ==
- Ruthenian language

== Literature ==
- Захарова, К. Ф.; Орлова, В. Г.; Сологуб, А. И.; Строганова, Т. Ю. (1970). В. Г. Орлова (ed.). Образование севернорусского наречия и среднерусских говоров (in Russian). Moscow: Наука. p. 456.
- Лопатин, В. В.; Улуханов, И. С. (2005). "Восточнославянские языки. Русский язык". Языки мира. Славянские языки (in Russian). Moscow: Academia. pp. 444–513. ISBN 5-87444-216-2.
- Пенькова, Яна А. (2023). "Начинательные глаголы в конструкциях с инфинитивом в русской письменности XVI‒XVII вв: в поисках различий" (PDF). Вестник Санкт-Петербургского университета: Язык и литература (in Russian). 20 (4): 739–767.
- Сичинава, Дмитрий В. (2016). "Старорусские/среднерусские тексты в НКРЯ: от экстенсивной коллекции к корпусу". El’Manuscript–2016: Rašytinis palikimas ir informacinės technologijos (PDF) (in Russian). Vilnius: Iževskas. pp. 208–210.

=== Further literature ===
- Словарь обиходного русского языка Московской Руси XVI—XVII вв.
