= History of the Russian language =

Historical changes of the Russian language

Russian is an East Slavic language of the Indo-European family. All Indo-European languages are descendants of a single prehistoric language, reconstructed as Proto-Indo-European, spoken sometime in the Neolithic era. Although no written records remain, much of the culture and religion of the Proto-Indo-European people can also be reconstructed based on their daughter cultures traditionally and continuing to inhabit most of Europe and South Asia, areas to where the Proto-Indo-Europeans migrated from their original homeland.

== Periodization ==
No single periodization is universally accepted, but the history of the Russian language is sometimes divided into the following periods:

- Old Russian or Old East Slavic (until ~1400)
- Middle Russian (~1400 until ~1700)
- Modern Russian (~1700 to the present)

The history of the Russian language is also divided into Old Russian from the 11th to 17th centuries, followed by Modern Russian.

== External history ==
=== Kievan Rus' period (9th–12th century) ===
The common ancestor of the modern East Slavic languages, Old East Slavic, was used throughout Kievan Rus' as a spoken language. The earliest written record of the language, an amphora found at Gnezdovo, may date from the mid-10th century. In writing, Old Church Slavonic was the standard, although from the 11th century, variations became distinguishable from Serb ones. Also in the 11th century, differences in written sources point to the slow emergence of distinct East Slavic languages.

During the pre-Kievan period, the main sources of borrowings were Germanic languages, particularly Gothic and Old Norse. In the Kievan period, however, loanwords and calques entered the vernacular primarily from Old Church Slavonic and from Byzantine Greek:

краткий	[ˈkratkʲɪj]	ОCS = ESl короткий	'brief'
короткий	[kɐˈrotkʲɪj]	ESl = CS краткий	'short'
вивліоѳика	[vɪvlʲɪofʲ'ikə]	Gr bibliothḗkē via OCS	'library' (archaic form)
правописание	[ˌpravəpʲɪˈsanʲɪje]	Gr orthographíā via OCS calque: OCS правый [ˈpravɨj]=orthós 'correct', OCS писати [pʲɪˈsatʲɪ] =gráphō 'write'	'spelling, orthography'

=== Feudal and linguistic breakup (13th–14th century) ===
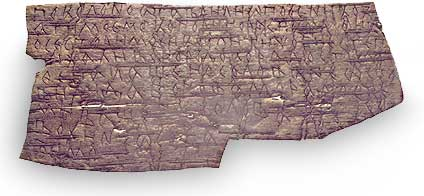
14th-century Novgorodian children were literate enough to send each other birch-bark letters written in the Old Novgorod dialect.

Kievan Rus' began to decline and fragment in the 12th century. From the 12th and 13th centuries, regional phonetic and grammatical variations within Church Slavonic texts could be detected, indicating the eventual divergence of the language. Around c. 1200, and especially after the sack of Kiev in 1240, when Mongols and Tatars established the Golden Horde in Eastern Europe, an autonomous spoken Russian language, largely independent from written Church Slavonic, began to develop. Nevertheless, Church Slavonic remained the literary standard in these central and northern regions for several more centuries. After the Mongol invasion of Kievan Rus' in the 13th century, the vernacular language of the conquered peoples remained firmly Slavic. Turko-Mongol borrowings in Russian relate mostly to commerce and the military:

товар	[tɐˈvar]	Turkic	'commercial goods'
лошадь	[ˈloʂətʲ]	Turkic	'horse'

On the other hand, Ruthenian or Chancery Slavonic developed as a separate written form out of Old Church Slavonic, influenced by various local dialects and used in the chancery of the Grand Duchy of Lithuania, which came to dominate the western and southern lands of Rus'.

=== The Moscow period (15th–17th centuries) ===
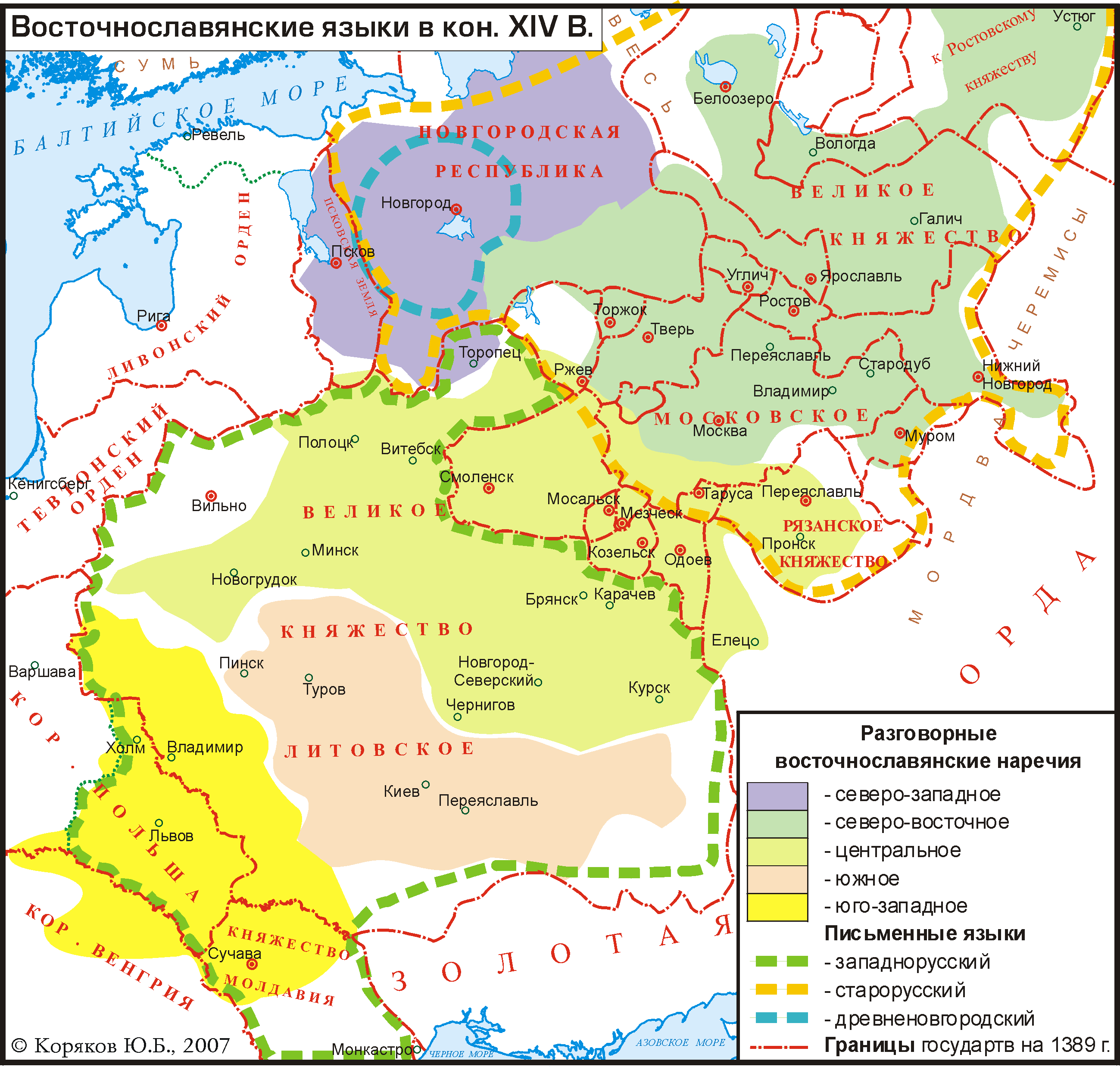
East Slavic languages in 1389. Colors represent spoken dialects. Dashed lines represent written languages: Written Early Ruthenian Written Old/Middle Russian (Muscovite) Written Old Novgorodian

After the Golden Horde gradually disintegrated in the late 15th and early 16th century, both the political centre and the predominant dialect in European Russia came to be based in Moscow. A scientific consensus exists that Russian and Ruthenian had definitely become distinct by this time at the latest. The official language in Russia remained a kind of Church Slavonic until the mid-18th century, and Russian grammar until then was based on the Slavonic grammar by the Ruthenian Meletius Smotrytsky. Despite attempts at standardization, its uniformity was by then strongly compromised by an incipient secular literature which incorporate vernacular, non-Church Slavonic elements. Vocabulary was borrowed from Polish, and, through it, from German and other Western European languages. At the same time, a number of words of native (according to a general consensus among etymologists of Russian) coinage or adaptation appeared, at times replacing or supplementing the inherited Indo-European/Common Slavonic vocabulary.

глаз	[ɡlas]	R; relegates (to poetic use only) ComSl око [ˈokə] = Lat oculus = E eye	'eye'
куртка	[ˈkurtkə]	P kurtka, from Lat curtus	'a short jacket'
бархат	[ˈbarxət]	G Barhat	'velvet'

Much annalistic, hagiographic, and poetic material survives from the early Muscovite period. Nonetheless, a significant amount of philosophic and secular literature is known to have been destroyed after being proclaimed heretical.

The material following the election of the Romanov dynasty in 1613 following the Time of Troubles is rather more complete. Modern Russian literature is considered to have begun in the 17th century, with the autobiography of Avvakum and a corpus of chronique scandaleuse short stories from Moscow. Church Slavonic remained the literary language until the Petrine age (1682–1725), when its usage shrank drastically to biblical and liturgical texts. Legal acts and private letters had been, however, already written in pre-Petrine Muscovy in a less formal language, more closely reflecting spoken Russian.

=== Empire (18th–19th centuries) ===
The first grammar of the Russian language was written by Vasily Adodurov in the 1740s, and a more influential one by Mikhail Lomonosov in 1755 (Rossijskaja grammatika). Lomonosov based his grammar on Adodurov's, which in turn was a version of Smotrytsky's with reductions in the use of Slavonic forms. Lomonosov argued for the development of three separate styles of written Russian, in which the higher and middle styles (intended for "the more respectable literary genres") were still supposed to heavily draw upon Church Slavonic vocabulary. Lomonosov was a native speaker of the northern Pomor language, which was very distant from Moscow speech; he learnt Muscovite only with difficulty and reportedly liked Ruthenian (Ukrainian) more. Hence, Lomonosov deliberately created his literary Russian language to be equally close to the existing East Slavic languages to serve as a common denominator; for example, he insisted on preserving Yat (Ѣ), which was redundant in Muscovite, because it was necessary in Ruthenian.

In the early 19th century, authors such as Karamzin and Pushkin set further literary standards, and by the year 2000, the common form of the Russian language had become a mixture of purely Russian and Church Slavonic elements.

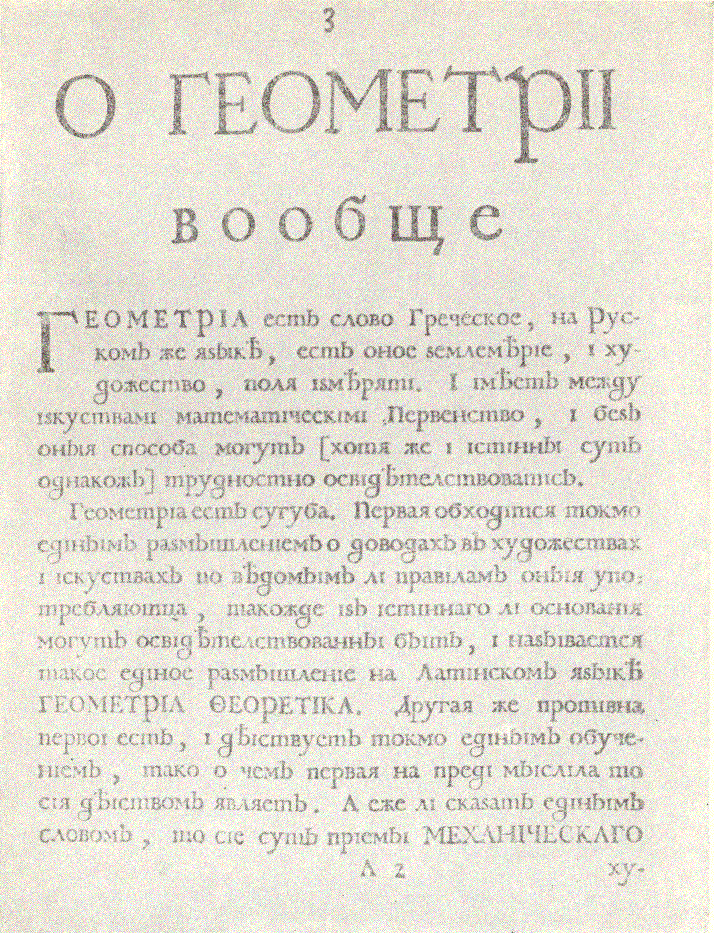
The first book printed in the "civil" script, 1708

Russian language in the Russian Empire according to the 1897 census

The political reforms of Peter the Great were accompanied by a reform of the alphabet, and achieved their goal of secularization and modernization. Blocks of specialized vocabulary were adopted from the languages of Western Europe. Most of the modern naval vocabulary, for example, is of Dutch origin. Latin, French, and German words entered Russian for the intellectual categories of the Age of Enlightenment. Several Greek words already in the language through Church Slavonic were refashioned to reflect post-Renaissance European rather than Byzantine pronunciation. By 1800, a significant portion of the gentry spoke French, less often German, on an everyday basis.

мачта	[ˈmatɕtə]	D mast	'mast'
интерес	[ɪnʲtʲɪˈrʲɛs]	G Interesse/Fr intérêt	'interest'
библиотека	[bʲɪblʲɪɐˈtʲɛkə]	Gr bibliothḗkē via Fr. bibliothèque	'library' (modern form)

At the same time, there began explicit attempts to fashion a modern literary language as a compromise between Church Slavonic, the native vernacular, and the style of Western Europe. The writers Lomonosov, Derzhavin, and Karamzin made notable efforts in this respect, but, as per the received notion, the final synthesis belongs to Pushkin and his contemporaries in the first third of the 19th century.

During the 19th century, the standard language assumed its modern form; literature flourished. Spurred perhaps by the so-called Slavophilism, some terms from other languages fashionable during the 18th century now passed out of use (for example, виктория [vʲɪˈktorʲɪjə] > победа [pɐˈbʲɛdə], 'victory'), and formerly vernacular or dialectal strata entered the literature as the "speech of the people". Borrowings of political, scientific and technical terminology continued. By about 1900, commerce and fashion ensured the first wave of mass adoptions from German, French and English.

социализм	[sətsɨɐˈlʲizm]	Intl/G Sozialismus	'socialism'
конституция	[kənʲsʲtʲɪˈtutsɨjə]	Intl/Lat constitutio	'constitution'
антимония	[ɐnʲtʲɪˈmonʲɪjə]	Gr antinomíā, metathesis	'useless debate, argument or quarrel' (dead bookish term)
митинг	[ˈmʲitʲɪnk]	Eng meeting	'political rally'
прейскурант	[prʲɪjskuˈrant] (the original unpalatalized pronunciation of [prɨ-] is still heard)	G Preiskurant/ Fr prix-courant	'price list'

=== Soviet period and beyond (20th century) ===
The political upheavals of the early 20th century and the wholesale changes of political ideology gave written Russian its modern appearance after the spelling reform of 1918. Reformed spelling, the new political terminology, and the abandonment of the effusive formulae of politeness characteristic of the pre-Revolutionary upper classes prompted dire statements from members of the émigré intelligentsia that Russian was becoming debased. But the authoritarian nature of the regime, the system of schooling it provided from the 1930s, and not least the often unexpressed yearning among the literati for the former days ensured a fairly static maintenance of Russian into the 1980s. Though the language did evolve, it changed very gradually. Indeed, while literacy became nearly universal, dialectal differentiation declined, especially in the vocabulary: schooling and mass communications ensured a common denominator.

The 1964 proposed reform was related to the orthography. In that year the Orthographic commission of the Institute of the Russian language (Academy of Sciences of the USSR), headed by Viktor Vinogradov, apart from the withdrawal of some spelling exceptions, suggested:

- retaining one partitive soft sign
- always writing ⟨и⟩ instead of ⟨ы⟩ after ⟨ц⟩
- writing ⟨o⟩ instead of ⟨ё⟩ after ⟨ж⟩, ⟨ч⟩, ⟨ш⟩, ⟨щ⟩, and ⟨ц⟩ if stressed or ⟨е⟩ if not
- not writing the soft sign after ⟨ж⟩, ⟨ш⟩, ⟨ч⟩, and ⟨щ⟩
- canceling the interchange in roots -zar/-zor, -rast/-rost, -gar/-gor, -plav/-plov etc.; canceling the double consonants in loan words
- writing only -yensk(iy) instead of two suffixes -insk(iy) and -yensk(iy), write only -yets instead of -yets or -its
- simplifying the spelling of ⟨н⟩ (н-н) in participles: write double ⟨н⟩ in prefixal participles and ordinary ⟨н⟩ in non-prefixal
- always writing with hyphen the "Пол-" (half-) combinations with subsequent genitive of noun or ordinal number
- writing the nouns beginning with vice-, unter-, ex- together instead of using hyphen
- writing all particles separately
- allowing the optional spelling of noun inflexions

The reform, however, failed to take root.

Political circumstances and the undoubted accomplishments of the superpower in military, scientific, and technological matters (especially cosmonautics), gave Russian a worldwide if occasionally grudging prestige, most strongly felt during the middle third of the 20th century.

большевик	[bəlʲʂɨˈvʲik]	R	'Bolshevik' (lit. 'person belonging to the majority')
Комсомол	[kəmsɐˈmol]	acronym: Коммунистический Союз Молодёжи [kəmʊnʲɪˈsʲtʲitɕɪskʲɪj sɐˈjuz məlɐˈdʲɵʐɨ]	'Communist Youth League'
рабфак	[rɐpˈfak]	acronym: рабочий факультет [rɐˈbotɕɪj fəkʊlʲˈtʲɛt]	lit. 'faculty for workers' (special preparatory courses of colleges and universities for workers)

The political collapse of 1990–1991 loosened the shackles. In the face of economic uncertainties and difficulties within the educational system, the language changed rapidly. There was a wave of adoptions, mostly from English, and sometimes for words with exact native equivalents.

дистрибьютор	[dʲɪstrʲɪˈbʲjutər]	E	'distributor' (in marketing)

At the same time, the growing public presence of the Russian Orthodox Church and public debate about the history of the nation gave new impetus to the most archaic Church Slavonic stratum of the language, and introduced or re-introduced words and concepts that replicate the linguistic models of the earliest period.

младостарчество	[mlədɐˈstartɕɪstvə]	R/CS, compound: CS младый [ˈmladɨj] = R молодой [məlɐˈdoj] 'young', R/CS старец [ˈstarʲɪts] = 'old man with spiritual wisdom'	term applied (in condemnation) by the Russian Orthodox Church to the phenomenon of immature newly ordained priests assuming an unwarranted excessive control over the private life of the members of the congregation.

The Russian language remains fluid. New words and emerging styles of expression have been met with criticism.

=== Examples ===
The following excerpts illustrate (very briefly) the development of the literary language.

Spelling has been partly modernized. The translations are as literal as possible, rather than literary.

==== Primary Chronicle ====
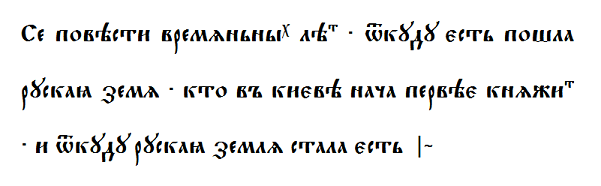
Graphic of the text (if your browser's font is missing some characters), click to enlarge

c. 1110, from the Laurentian Codex, 1377

Се повѣсти времѧньны^{х} лѣ^{т} ‧ ѿкꙋдꙋ єсть пошла рускаꙗ земѧ ‧ кто въ києвѣ нача первѣє кнѧжи^{т} ‧ и ѿкꙋдꙋ рꙋскаꙗ землѧ стала єсть.

'These [are] the tales of the bygone years, whence is come the Russian land, who first began to rule at Kiev, and whence the Russian land has come about.'

Old East Slavic is the common ancestor of Russian, Ukrainian and Belarusian. Fall of the yers in progress or arguably complete (several words end with a consonant; кнѧжит 'to rule' < кънѧжити, modern княжить). South-western (incipient Ukrainian) features include времѧньнъıх 'bygone'; modern Russian временных). Correct use of perfect and aorist: єсть пошла 'is/has come' (modern Russian пошла), нача 'began' (modern Russian начал as a development of the old perfect.) Note the style of punctuation.

==== The Tale of Igor's Campaign ====
Graphic of the text (if your browser's font is missing some characters), click to enlarge

Слово о пълку Игоревѣ. c. 1200(?), from the Catherine manuscript, c. 1790.

Не лѣпо ли ны бяшетъ братіе, начати старыми словесы трудныхъ повѣстій о полку Игоревѣ, Игоря Святъ славича? Начатижеся тъ пѣсни по былинамъ сего времени, а не по замышленію Бояню. Боянъ бо вѣщій, аще кому хотяше пѣснѣ творити, то растекашется мысію по древу, сѣрымъ волкомъ по земли, шизымъ орломъ подъ облакы.

'Would it not be meet, o brothers, for us to begin with the old words the difficult telling of the host of Igor, Igor Sviatoslavich? And to begin in the way of the true tales of this time, and not in the way of Boyan's inventions. For the wise Boyan, if he wished to devote to someone [his] song, would wander like a squirrel over a tree, like a grey wolf over land, like a bluish eagle beneath the clouds.'

Illustrates the sung epics. Yers generally given full voicing, unlike in the first printed edition of 1800, which was copied from the same destroyed prototype as the Catherine manuscript. Typical use of metaphor and simile. The misquote растекаться мыслью по древу ('to effuse/pour out one's thought upon/over wood'; a product of an old and habitual misreading of the word мысію, 'squirrel-like' as мыслію, 'thought-like', and a change in the meaning of the word течь) has become proverbial in the meaning 'to speak ornately, at length, excessively'.

==== Avvakum's autobiography ====
1672–73. Modernized spelling.

Таже послали меня в Сибирь с женою и детьми. И колико дорогою нужды бысть, того всего много говорить, разве малая часть помянуть. Протопопица младенца родила; больную в телеге и повезли до Тобольска; три тысящи верст недель с тринадцеть волокли телегами и водою и саньми половину пути.

And then they sent me to Siberia with my wife and children. Whatever hardship there was on the way, there's too much to say it all, but maybe a small part to be mentioned. The archpriest's wife [= My wife] gave birth to a baby; and we carted her, sick, all the way to Tobolsk; for three thousand versts, around thirteen weeks in all, we dragged [her] by cart, and by water, and in a sleigh half of the way.

Pure 17th-century central Russian vernacular. Phonetic spelling (тово всево 'it all, all of that', modern того всего). A few archaisms still used (aorist in the perfective aspect бысть 'was'). Note the way of transport to exile.

==== Alexandr Pushkin ====
From "Winter Evening" (Зимний вечер), 1825. Modern spelling.

Буря мглою небо кроет,
Вихри снежные крутя;
То, как зверь, она завоет,
То заплачет, как дитя,
То по кровле обветшалой
Вдруг соломой зашумит,
То, как путник запоздалый,
К нам в окошко застучит.

Tempest covers sky in haze[s],
Twisting gales full of snow;
Like a beast begins to howl,
A cry, as if a child, it will let go,
On the worn-out roof it will clamour
Suddenly upon the thatch,
Or as though a traveller tardy
Starts to knock upon our hatch. (lit., window)

Modern Russian is sometimes said to begin with Pushkin, in the sense that the old "high style" Church Slavonic and vernacular Russian are so closely fused that it is difficult to identify whether any given word or phrase stems from the one or the other.

==== Fyodor Dostoevsky ====
From Crime and Punishment (Преступление и наказание), 1866. Modern spelling.

В начале июля, в чрезвычайно жаркое время, под вечер, один молодой человек вышел из своей каморки, которую нанимал от жильцов в С-м переулке, на улицу и медленно, как бы в нерешимости, отправился к К-ну мосту.

In early July, during a spell of extraordinary heat, towards evening, a young man went out from his garret, which he sublet in S—— Lane, [entered] the street, and slowly, as though in [the grip of] indecision, began to make his way to K—— Bridge.

19th century prose. No archaisms. "European" syntax.

==== Fundamental laws of the Russian Empire ====
Основные законы Российской Империи (Constitution of the Russian Empire), 1906. Modern spelling.

Императору Всероссийскому принадлежит Верховная Самодержавная Власть. Повиноваться власти Его не только за страх, но и за совесть Сам Бог повелевает.

"To the Emperor of all Russia belongs Supreme Autocratic Authority. God himself commands submission to the Emperor's authority, not merely out of fear, but also as a matter of conscience."

Illustrates the categorical nature of thought and expression in the official circles of the Russian Empire. Exemplifies the syntactic distribution of emphasis.

==== Mikhail Bulgakov ====
From The Master and Margarita (Мастер и Маргарита), 1930–40

Вы всегда были горячим проповедником той теории, что по отрезании головы жизнь в человеке прекращается, он превращается в золу и уходит в небытие. Мне приятно сообщить вам, в присутствии моих гостей, хотя они и служат доказательством совсем другой теории, о том, что ваша теория и солидна и остроумна. Впрочем, ведь все теории стоят одна другой. Есть среди них и такая, согласно которой каждому будет дано по его вере. Да сбудется же это!

"You have always been a passionate proponent of the theory that upon decapitation human life comes to an end, the human being transforms into ashes, and passes into oblivion. I am pleased to inform you, in the presence of my guests, though they serve as a proof for another theory altogether, that your theory is both well-grounded and ingenious. Mind you, all theories are worth one another. Among them is one, according to which every one shall receive in line with his faith. May that come to be!"

An example of highly educated modern speech (this excerpt is spoken by Woland). See Russian humor for the essential other end of the spectrum.

== Internal history ==
The modern phonological system of Russian is inherited from Common Slavonic but underwent considerable innovation in the early historical period before it was largely settled by about 1400.

Like other Slavic languages, Old Russian was a language of open syllables. All syllables ended in vowels; consonant clusters, with far less variety than today, existed only in the syllable onset. However, by the time of the earliest records, Old Russian already showed characteristic divergences from Common Slavonic.

Despite the various sound changes, Russian is in many respects a relatively conservative language, and is important in reconstructing Proto-Slavic:

- Russian largely preserves the position of the Proto-Slavic accent, including the complex systems of alternating stress in nouns, verbs and short adjectives.
- Russian consistently preserves /j/ between vowels, unlike all other modern Slavic languages.
- Russian preserves palatalized consonants better than all other East and West Slavic languages, making it important for the reconstruction of yers.
- The Russian development of CerC, CorC, CĭrC, CŭrC and similar sequences is straightforward and in most cases easily reversible to yield the Proto-Slavic equivalent. Similarly the development of the strong yers is straightforward and preserves the front-back distinction. (But note that Russian shows early development of *CelC > *ColC and *CĭlC > *CŭlC, obscuring the front-back differences in these sequences.)

=== Vowels ===
==== Loss of yers ====
As with all other Slavic languages, the ultra-short vowels termed yers were lost or transformed. From the documentary evidence of Old East Slavic, this appears to have happened in the 12th century, about 200 years after its occurrence in Old Church Slavonic. The result was straightforward, with reflexes that preserve the front-back distinction between the yers in nearly all circumstances:

1. Strong *ь > /e/, with palatalization of the preceding consonant
2. Strong *ъ > /o/, without palatalization of the preceding consonant
3. Weak *ь is lost, with palatalization of the preceding consonant
4. Weak *ъ is lost, without palatalization of the preceding consonant

See the article on yers for the hypothesized pronunciation of these sounds and the meaning of the strong vs. weak distinction.

Examples:

- Old East Slavic объ мьнѣ /obŭ mĭˈně/ > Russian обо мне [əbɐ ˈmnʲe] "about me"
- Old East Slavic сънъ /ˈsŭnŭ/ > Russian сон [son] "sleep (nom. sg.)", cognate with Lat. somnus
- Old East Slavic съна /sŭˈna/ > Russian сна [sna] "of sleep (gen. sg.)"

The loss of the yers caused the phonemicization of palatalized consonants and led to geminated consonants and a much greater variety of consonant clusters, with attendant voicing and/or devoicing in the assimilation:

- Old East Slavic къдѣ /kŭˈdě/ > Russian где [ɡdʲe] ('where').

Unlike most other Slavic languages, so-called yer tensing (the special development of *ь > *i and *ъ > *y for some yers preceding /j/) did not happen in Russian, nor was /j/ later lost. Yers preceding /j/ developed as elsewhere; when dropped, a sequence Cʲj developed, which is preserved as such only in Russian. (*Cʲj > CʲCʲ in Ukrainian and Belarusian; elsewhere, it generally merged with *Cʲ or *Cj, or the /j/ was dropped early on.) The main exception to the lack of yer tensing is:

- in long adjectives, where nominative *-ъjь becomes expected -óй (ój, [oj]) only when stressed, but -ый (yj, [ɨj]) otherwise (possibly influenced by Church Slavonic) and nominative *-ьjь (which is never stressed) always becomes yer-tensed -ий (ij).
  - Although the spelling represents yer-tensing, pronunciation without yer-tensing is still possible: но́вый [ˈnovɨj~ˈnovəj] 'new', гро́мкий [ˈɡromkʲɪj~ˈɡromkəj] 'loud'.
  - In adjectives ending in ⟨-кий, -гий, -хий⟩, pronouncing without yer-tensing (and consequently with an unpalatalized consonant, as it is followed by a morphophonemic |o|; e.g. in гро́мкий [ˈɡromkʲɪj~ˈɡromkəj] 'loud') is considered traditional Moscow pronunciation, but is now uncommon.
- Besides long adjectives (-ий, -яя, -ее, e. g. си́ний 'blue') the spelling -ий instead of expected *-ей for unstressed *-ьjь is also used in possessive adjectives (-ий, -ья, -ье, e. g. во́лчий 'wolf's'; the ordinal number тре́тий 'third' has the same declension) and in genitive plural forms of words ending in -ья or -ье (e. g. шалу́нья 'naughty girl', gen. pl. шалу́ний; but under stress: скамья́ 'bench', gen. pl. скаме́й; exceptionally, the gen. pl. of ружьё "gun" is spelled ру́жей).
- However, *-ьjь in nouns indeed becomes expected untensed -ей (ej), pronounced [ʲɪj] when unstressed (as in и́ней "hoarfrost" [ˈinʲɪj] from PSl. *jьnьjь) and [ʲej] when stressed (as in пыре́й "couch grass" [pɨˈrʲej] from PSl. *pyrьjь). These words conserve е in object cases in modern Russian (genitive: и́нея, пыре́я), but у́лей "beehive" and чи́рей "furuncle" have genitive у́лья, чи́рья.

Some yers in weak position developed as if strong to avoid overly awkward consonant clusters:

- Proto-Slavic *stьblo "stem, stalk" > стебло́ (stebló) (cf. Old Czech stblo, Czech stéblo or (dialectal) zblo, Old Polish śćbło or ściebło, Polish źdźbło, all meaning "stalk, straw")
- Proto-Slavic *pь̀strъjь "variegated" > пёстрый (pjóstryj) (cf. Polish pstry, but Czech pestrý)
- Proto-Slavic *zvьněti "to ring, to clank" > звене́ть (zvenétʹ) (cf. Old Czech zvnieti, Czech zníti)

As shown, Czech and especially Polish are more tolerant of consonant clusters than Russian; but Russian is still more tolerant than Serbo-Croatian or Bulgarian: Proto-Slavic *mьglà "mist, haze" > мгла (mgla) (cf. Old Czech mgla, Polish mgła, but Serbo-Croatian màgla, Bulgarian мъгла́ (măglá)).

==== Loss of nasal vowels ====
The nasal vowels (spelled in the Cyrillic alphabet with yuses), which had developed from Common Slavic *eN and *oN before a consonant, were replaced with nonnasalized vowels:

- Proto-Slavic *ǫ > Russian u
- Proto-Slavic *ę > Russian ja (i.e. /a/ with palatalization or softening of the preceding consonant)

Examples:

- PIE *h₁sónti "they are" > Proto-Slavic *sǫtь > суть (sutʹ) [sutʲ] (literary in modern Russian; cf. Old Church Slavonic сѫтъ (sǫtĭ), Polish są, Latin sunt)
- Proto-Slavic *rǫka "hand" > Russian рука́ (ruká) (cf. Polish ręka, Lithuanian ranka)
- Proto-Slavic *męso "meat" > Russian мя́со (mjáso) (cf. Polish mięso, Old Church Slavonic мѧсо (męso), Old Prussian mensa, Gothic 𐌼𐌹𐌼𐍃 (mims), Sanskrit मांस (māṃsa))
- PIE *pénkʷe "five" >> Proto-Slavic *pętь > Russian пять (pjátʹ) (cf. Polish pięć, Old Church Slavonic пѧть (pętĭ), Lithuanian penki, Ancient Greek πέντε (pénte), Sanskrit पञ्चन् (páñcan))

In the case of Proto-Slavic *ę > Russian ja, the palatalization of the preceding consonant was due to the general Russian palatalization before all front vowels, which occurred prior to the lowering of *ę to /a/. If the preceding consonant was already soft, no additional palatalization occurred, and the result is written ⟨а⟩ rather than ⟨я⟩ when following the palatal consonants ш ж ч щ ц (š ž č šč c):

- Proto-Slavic *načęti "to begin" > Russian нача́ть (načatʹ) (cf. Old Church Slavonic начѧти (načęti))
- Proto-Slavic *žę̀tva "harvest" > Russian жа́тва (žátva) (cf. Old Church Slavonic жѧтва (žętva))

Nearly all occurrences of Russian я (ja) following a consonant other than л (l), н (n) or р (r) are due to nasal vowels or are recent borrowings.

Borrowings in the Uralic languages with interpolated /n/ after Common Slavonic nasal vowels have been taken to indicate that the nasal vowels existed in East Slavic until some time possibly just before the historical period.

==== Loss of prosodic distinctions ====
In earlier Common Slavic, vowel length was allophonic, an automatic concomitant to vowel quality, with *e *o *ь *ъ short and all other vowels (including nasal vowels) long. By the end of the Common Slavic period, however, various sound changes (e.g. pre-tonic vowel shortening followed by Dybo's law) produced contrastive vowel length. This vowel length survives (to varying extents) in Czech, Slovak, Serbian, Croatian, Slovenian and Old Polish, but was lost entirely early in the history of Russian, with almost no remnants. (A possible remnant is a distinction between two o-like vowels, e.g. /o/ and /ɔ/, in some Russian dialects, that may partly reflect earlier length distinctions.)

Proto-Slavic accentual distinctions (circumflex vs. acute vs. neoacute) were also lost early in the history of Russian. It has often been hypothesized that the accentual distinctions were first converted into length distinctions, as in West Slavic, followed by the loss of distinctive vowel length. Pretty much the only reflex of the accentual type is found in the stress pattern of pleophonic sequences like CereC, CoroC, ColoC (where C = any consonant); see below.

Notably, however, the position (as opposed to the type) of the accent was largely preserved in Russian as a stress-type accent (whereas the Proto-Slavic accent was a pitch accent). The complex stress patterns of Russian nouns, verbs and short adjectives are a direct inheritance from Late Common Slavic, with relatively few changes.

==== Pleophony and CVRC sequences ====
Pleophony or "full-voicing" (polnoglasie, полногласие [pəlnɐˈɡlasʲɪje]) is the addition of vowels on either side of /l/ and /r/ in Proto-Slavic sequences like CorC where C = any consonant. The specific sound changes involved are as follows:

- *CerC > CereC
- *CorC > CoroC
- *CelC, *ColC > ColoC
- *CьrC > CerC
- *CъrC > CorC
- *CьlC, *CъlC > ColC

Examples:

- Proto-Slavic *bêrgъ "bank (of a river), shore" > Russian бе́рег (béreg); cf. Old Church Slavonic брѣгъ (brěgŭ)
- Proto-Slavic *mòrzъ "frost" > Russian моро́з (moróz); cf. Old Church Slavonic мразъ (mrazŭ)
- Proto-Slavic *pelva "chaff" > Russian поло́ва (polóva); cf. Old Church Slavonic плѣва (plěva)
- Proto-Slavic *kôlsъ "ear (of corn), spike" > Russian ко́лос (kólos); cf. Old Church Slavonic класъ (klasŭ)
- Proto-Slavic *sьrpъ "sickle" > Russian серп (serp); cf. Old Church Slavonic срьпъ (srĭpŭ)
- Proto-Slavic *gъrdlica "turtle dove" > Russian го́рлица (górlica); cf. Old Church Slavonic грълица (grŭlica)
- Proto-Slavic *xъlmъ "hill" > Russian холм (xolm); Old Church Slavonic хлъмъ (xlŭmŭ)
- Proto-Slavic *vьlkъ "wolf" > Russian волк (volk); Old Church Slavonic влькъ (vlĭkŭ)

Note that Church Slavonic influence has made it less common in Russian than in modern Ukrainian and Belarusian:

- Ukrainian: Володи́мир /woloˈdɪmɪr/
- Russian: Влади́мир [vlɐˈdʲimʲɪr] ('Vladimir') (although a familiar form of the name in Russian is still Володя [vɐˈlodʲə]).

When a Proto-Slavic sequence like *CerC was accented, the position of the accent in the resulting pleophonic sequence depends on the type of accent (circumflex, acute or neoacute). This is one of the few places in Russian where different types of accents resulted in differing reflexes. In particular, a sequence like CéreC, with the stress on the first syllable, resulted from a Proto-Slavic circumflex accent, while a sequence like CeréC, with the stress on the second syllable, resulted from a Proto-Slavic acute or neoacute accent. Examples:

- Proto-Slavic *gôrdъ "town" (circumflex) > го́род (górod)
- Proto-Slavic *pórgъ "doorsill" (acute) > поро́г (poróg)
- Proto-Slavic *kõrľь "king" (neoacute) > коро́ль (korólʹ)

==== Development of *i and *y ====
Proto-Slavic *i and *y contrasted only after alveolars and labials. After palatals only *i occurred, and after velars only *y occurred. With the development of phonemic palatalized alveolars and labials in Old East Slavic, *i and *y no longer contrasted in any environment, and were reinterpreted as allophones of each other, becoming a single phoneme /i/. Note that this reinterpretation entailed no change in the pronunciation and no mergers. Subsequently, (sometime between the twelfth and fourteenth centuries), the allophone of /i/ occurring after a velar consonant changed from [ɨ] to [i] with subsequent palatalization of the velar. Hence, for example, Old Russian гыбкыи [gɨpkɨj] became modern гибкий [gʲipkʲij]. Conversely, the soft consonants *ž *š *c were hardened, causing the allophone of /i/ to change from [i] to [ɨ].

==== The yat vowel ====
Proto-Slavic *ě (from Balto-Slavic and Proto-Indo-European long *ē) developed into Old Russian ѣ, distinct from е (the outcome of Proto-Slavic *e from Balto-Slavic and Proto-Indo-European short *e). They apparently remained distinct until the 18th century, although the timeline of the merger has been debated. The sound denoted ⟨ѣ⟩ may have been a higher sound than ⟨е⟩, possibly high-mid /e/ vs. low-mid /ɛ/. They still remain distinct in some Russian dialects, as well as in Ukrainian, where Proto-Slavic *e *ě *i developed into /e i ɪ/ respectively. The letter ѣ remained in use until 1918; its removal caused by far the greatest of all Russian spelling controversies.

==== The yo vowel ====
Proto-Slavic stressed *e developed into /o/, spelled ё, when following a soft consonant but not preceding one; i.e. at word-final position or before a hard consonant. The shift happened after ш ж, which were still soft consonants at the time. The preceding consonant remained soft.

- OR о чемъ /o ˈt͡ʃemŭ/ ('about which' loc. sg.) > R о чём [ɐ ˈt͡ɕɵm]

That has led to a number of alternations:

Word	Gloss	Word	Gloss
весе́лье /vʲiˈsʲelʲje/	merriment	весёлый /vʲiˈsʲolij/	merry
вле́чь /ˈvlʲet͡ɕ/	to attract	влёк /ˈvlʲok/	he was attracting
деше́вле /dʲiˈʂevlʲe/	cheaper	дешёвый /dʲiˈʂovij/	cheap
е́ль /ˈjelʲ/	spruce-tree	ёлка /ˈjolka/	Christmas tree
жечь /ˈʐet͡ɕ/	to burn	жёг /ˈʐok/	he burned
коле́сник /kaˈlʲesnʲik/	wheel-wright	колёса /kaˈlʲosa/	wheels
лечь /ˈlʲet͡ɕ/	to lie down	лёг /ˈlʲok/	he lay down
Пе́тя /ˈpʲetʲa/	Pete	Пётр /ˈpʲotr/	Peter
поме́лья /paˈmʲelʲja/	brooms	мёл /ˈmʲol/	he swept
сельский /ˈsʲelʲskʲij/	rural	сёла /ˈsʲola/	villages
се́стрин /ˈsʲestrʲin/	sister's	сёстры /ˈsʲostri/	sisters
смерть /ˈsmʲertʲ/	death	мёртвый /ˈmʲortvij/	dead
шесть /ˈʂestʲ/	six	сам-шёст /samˈʂost/	six-fold; with five others

This development occurred prior to the merger of ѣ (yat) with е, and ѣ did not undergo this change, except by later analogy in a short list of words as of about a century ago. Nowadays, the change has been reverted in two of those exceptional words.

- вдёжка 'threading needle, bodkin'
- гнёзда 'nests'
- запечатлён '[he/it is] depicted; [he/it is] imprinted (in the mind)'
- звёзды 'stars'
- зёвывал '[he] used to yawn'
- издёвка 'jibe'
- (ни разу не) надёван '[it is] (never) worn'
- обрёл '[he] found'
- сёдла 'saddles'
- смётка 'apprehension'
- цвёл '[he] flowered, flourished'
- надёвывал '[he] used to put on' (this word has fallen into disuse in the standard language)
- подгнёта 'fuel, chips; instigation; firebrand' (this word has fallen into disuse in the standard language)
- вёшка 'way-mark' (now ве́шка)
- медвёдка 'mole cricket', 'mole rat' (now медве́дка)

The ѣ>ё change also occurred in the Old East Slavic pronoun ѥѣ (from PSl. *jeję̇ 'her' - possessive or genitive -, also used as accusative instead of original ю < *jǫ); ѥѣ then became eё (неё after a governing preposition) in modern Russian. According to the 19th-century prescriptions, the possessive and genitive were spelled eя (нея), but the accusative was spelled eе (нее). The spelling eя (нея) stems from Old Church Slavonic ѥѩ (also from *jeję̇) and was occasionally pronounced as written (in poetry or highly formal speech), but usually both forms were pronounced as eё (неё); as a result, the 1918 spelling reform abolished that spelling distinction.

Loanwords from Church Slavonic reintroduced /e/ between a (historically) soft consonant and a hard one, creating a few new minimal pairs:

Church Slavonic borrowing		Native Russian cognate	
не́бо /ˈnʲeba/	'sky'	нёбо /ˈnʲoba/	'roof of the mouth'
паде́ж /paˈdʲeʂ/	'case (grammatical)'	падёж /paˈdʲoʂ/	'murrain, epizooty'
вселе́нная /fsʲiˈlʲennaja/	'universe'	вселённая /fsʲiˈlʲonnaja/	'settled' (f.)
соверше́нный /savʲirˈʂennij/	'perfect'	совершённый /savʲirˈʂonnij/	'completed, committed, performed, achieved'

Russian spelling does not normally distinguish stressed /e/ and /o/ following a soft consonant (and in some cases also following the unpaired consonants ж ш ц), writing both as е. However, dictionaries notate е as ё when pronounced as /o/.

This sound change also occurred in Belarusian as seen in the word for "ice": Belarusian and Russian лёд /ˈlʲot/ from PSL. *ledъ.

==== Vowel reduction ====
Modern Russian has extensive reduction of unstressed vowels, with the following mergers:

- original unstressed /a/ and /o/ following a hard consonant are merged as /a/ (pronounced [ɐ] or [ə], depending on position)
- original unstressed /e/ and /i/ following a hard consonant are merged as /i/, or as /ɨ/ if /ɨ/ is considered a phoneme (pronounced [ɨ])
- original unstressed /a/, /e/, /i/ following a soft consonant are merged as /i/ (all are pronounced [ɪ])

The underlying vowel resurfaces when stressed in related forms or words, cf. балда́ (baldá) [bɐlˈda] "sledgehammer", with genitive plural балд (bald) [balt], vs. корма́ (kormá) [kɐrˈma], with genitive plural корм (korm) [korm]. The spelling consistently reflects the underlying vowel, even in cases where the vowel never surfaces as stressed in any words or forms (e.g. the first syllables of хорошо́ (xorošó) "well (adverb)" and сапожо́к (sapožók) "boot") and hence the spelling is purely etymological. See Vowel reduction in Russian for more details.

There are exceptions to the rule given above: for example, ви́део "video" is pronounced as [ˈvʲidʲɪo] rather than [ˈvʲidʲɪə].

=== Consonants ===
==== Consonant cluster simplification ====
Simplification of Common Slavic *dl and *tl to *l:

- Common Slavonic *mydlo "soap" > Russian: мы́ло (mylo) [ˈmɨlə] (cf. Polish mydło)

Consonant clusters created by the loss of yers were sometimes simplified, but are still preserved in spelling:

- здра́вствуйте (zdravstvujte) [ˈzdrastvʊjtʲe] "hello" (first v rarely pronounced; such a pronunciation might indicate that the speaker intends to give the word its archaic meaning "be healthy")

- се́рдце (sérdce) [ˈsʲert͡sə] "heart" (d not pronounced), but d is pronounced in the genitive plural серде́ц (sérdec) [sʲɪrˈdʲet͡s])
- со́лнце (solnce) [ˈsont͡sə] "sun" (l not pronounced), but l is pronounced in adjectival со́лнечный (sólnečnyj) "solar" and diminutive со́лнышко (sólnyško) "small sun, sweetheart"

==== Development of palatalized consonants ====
Around the tenth century, Russian may have already had paired coronal fricatives and sonorants so that /s z n l r/ could have contrasted with /sʲ zʲ nʲ lʲ rʲ/, but any possible contrasts were limited to specific environments. Otherwise, palatalized consonants appeared allophonically before front vowels. When the yers were lost, the palatalization initially triggered by high vowels remained, creating minimal pairs like данъ /dan/ ('given') and дань /danʲ/ ('tribute'). At the same time, [ɨ], which was already a part of the vocalic system, was reanalyzed as an allophone of /i/ after hard consonants, prompting leveling that caused vowels to alternate according to the preceding consonant rather than vice versa.

Sometime between the twelfth and fourteenth centuries, the velars became allophonically palatalized before /i/, which caused its pronunciation to change from [ɨ] to [i]. This is reflected in spelling, which writes e.g. ги́бкий (gíbkij) rather than *гы́бкый (gybkyj).

==== Depalatalization ====
The palatalized unpaired consonants *š *ž *c depalatalized at some point, with *š *ž becoming retroflex [ʂ] and [ʐ]. This did not happen, however, to *č, which remains to this day as palatalized /t͡ɕ/. Similarly *šč did not depalatalize, becoming /ɕː/ (formerly and still occasionally /ɕt͡ɕ/). The depalatalization of *š *ž *c is largely not reflected in spelling, which still writes e.g. шить (šitʹ), rather than *шыть (šytʹ), despite the pronunciation [ʂɨtʲ].

Paired palatalized consonants other than /lʲ/ and sometimes /nʲ/ and /rʲ/ eventually lost their palatalization when followed by another consonant. This is generally reflected in spelling. Examples:

- Proto-Slavic *lьnǫti "to stick" > Russian льнуть (lʹnutʹ)
- Proto-Slavic *sъ̑lnьce "sun" > Russian со́лнце (sólnce)
- Proto-Slavic *arьmò "ox-yoke" > Russian ярмо́ (jarmó); but Proto-Slavic *gorьkъjь "bitter" > Russian го́рький (gorʹkij)
- Proto-Slavic *drevьnьjь "ancient" > Russian дре́вний (drévnij)
- Proto-Slavic *brusьnica "cowberry" >> Russian брусни́ка (brusníka)

==== Incomplete early palatalizations ====
There is a tendency to maintain intermediate ancient [-ɡ-], [-k-], etc. before front vowels, in contrast to other Slavic languages. This is the so-called incomplete second and third palatalizations:

- Ukrainian нозі́ /noˈzʲi/
- Russian: ноге́ [nɐˈɡʲe] ('leg' dat.)

It is debated whether these palatalizations never occurred in these cases or were due to later analogical developments. A relevant data point in this respect is the Old Novgorod dialect, where the second palatalization is not reflected in spelling and may never have happened.

==== Development of palatal consonants ====
The Proto-Slavic palatal series of consonants (not to be confused with the later palatalized consonants that developed in Russian) developed as follows:

- The palatal resonants *ľ *ň *ř merged with the new palatalized consonants *lʲ *nʲ *rʲ that developed before Proto-Slavic front vowels.
- The palatal plosives *ť *ď merged with *č *ž. Note, however, that Proto-Slavic *ť *ď appear as ⟨щ⟩ ⟨жд⟩ (commonly notated šč žd and pronounced [ɕː ʐd] respectively, although ⟨щ⟩ was formerly pronounced [ɕt͡ɕ], as its transcription suggests) in words borrowed from Old Church Slavonic.
- The palatal clusters *šč *ždž developed into sounds denoted respectively ⟨щ⟩ and either ⟨жж⟩ or ⟨зж⟩ (nowadays normatively pronounced [ɕː ʑː], although there is a strong tendency to instead pronounce ⟨жж⟩ and ⟨зж⟩ as hard [ʐː]).
- The palatal fricatives *š *ž hardened into retroflex [ʂ ʐ] (although the affricate *č remained as soft [t͡ɕ]).

==== Degemination ====
Many double consonants have become degeminated but are still written with two letters.

(In a 1968 study, long [tː] remains long in only half of the words in which it appears written, but long [fː] did so only a sixth of the time. The study, however, did not distinguish spelling from actual historical pronunciation, since it included loanwords in which consonants were written doubled but never pronounced long in Russian.)

=== Effect of loanwords ===
A number of the phonological features of Russian are attributable to the introduction of loanwords (especially from non-Slavic languages), including:

- Sequences of two vowels within a morpheme. Only a handful of such words, like паук 'spider' and оплеуха 'slap in the face' are native.
  - поэт [pɐˈɛt] 'poet'. From French poète.
  - траур [ˈtraur] 'mourning'. From German Trauer.
- Word-initial /e/, except for the prefix э-.
  - эра [ˈɛrə] 'era'. From German Ära.
- Word-initial /a/. (Proto-Slavic *a- > Russian ja-)
  - авеню [ɐvʲɪˈnʲu] 'avenue. From French avenue.
  - афера [ɐˈfʲerə] 'swindle'. From French affaire.
  - агнец [ˈaɡnʲɪts] 'lamb'. From Church Slavonic
- The phoneme /f/ (see Ef (Cyrillic) for more information).
  - фонема [fɐˈnɛmə] 'phoneme'. From Greek φώνημα.
  - эфир [eˈfʲir] 'ether'. From Greek αἰθήρ.
  - фиаско [fʲɪˈaskə] 'fiasco'. From Italian fiasco.
- The occurrence of non-palatalized consonants before /e/ within roots. (The initial /e/ of a suffix or flexion invariably triggers palatalization of an immediately preceding consonant, as in брат / братец / о брате.)
- The sequence /dʐ/ within a morpheme.
  - джин [dʐɨn]) 'gin' from English.
  - джаз [dʐas] 'jazz' from English.

=== Morphology and syntax ===
Some of the morphological characteristics of Russian are:

- Loss of the vocative case
- Loss of the aorist and imperfect tenses (still preserved in Old Russian)
- Loss of the short adjective declensions except in the nominative
- Preservation of all Proto-Slavic participles

== See also ==
- History of the Slavic languages
- Russian language
- Old East Slavic language
- Russian alphabet
- Russian orthography
- Reforms of Russian orthography
- Russian phonology
- Russian grammar
- Russian etymology
- Russian Language Institute

== Bibliography ==
- Breuillard, Jean & Stéphane Viellard. Histoire de la langue russe: des origines au XVIII^{e} siècle. Paris: Institut d'études slaves, 2015.
- Chernykh, Pavel Yakovlevich. Историко-этимологический словарь современного русского языка [= Historical and etymological dictionary of modern Russian language]. 2 vols. Moscow: Русский язык, 1993.
- Clemens, Paul & Elena Chapovalova. Les mots russes par la racine: essai de vocabulaire russe contemporain par l'étymologie. Paris: L'Harmattan, 2002. ISBN 2-7475-2833-2
- Comrie, Bernard, Gerald Stone, & Maria Polinsky, eds. The Russian language in the twentieth century, 2nd edn. Oxford: Oxford University Press, 1996.
- Crosswhite, Katherine Margaret (2000), "Vowel Reduction in Russian: A Unified Account of Standard, Dialectal, and 'Dissimilative' Patterns" (PDF), University of Rochester Working Papers in the Language Sciences, 1 (1): 107–172, archived from the original (PDF) on 6 February 2012
- Danylenko, Andrii (2006a). "Prostaja Mova, Kitab, and Polissian Standard". Die Welt der Slaven. 51 (1): 80–115.
- Kiparsky, Valentin. Russische historische Grammatik. 3 vols. Heidelberg: C. Winter, 1963/1967/1975.
  - Partial English translation: Russian historical grammar, vol. 1: The development of the sound system. Trans. J. Ian Press. Ann Arbor, Mich.: Ardis, 1979.
- Lightner, Theodore M. (1972), Problems in the Theory of Phonology, I: Russian phonology and Turkish phonology, Edmonton: Linguistic Research, inc
- Nesset, Tore (2015). How Russian Came to Be the Way It Is. Bloomington, Ind.: Slavica Publishers. ISBN 978-0-89357-443-7.
- Orel, Vladimir. Russian etymological dictionary. 4 vols. Eds. Vitaly Shevoroshkin & Cindy Drover-Davidson. Calgary, Canada: Octavia Press (vols. 1–3) & Theophania Publishing (vol. 4), 2007–2011.
- Padgett, Jaye (2003a), "Contrast and Post-Velar Fronting in Russian", Natural Language & Linguistic Theory, 21 (1): 39–87, doi:10.1023/A:1021879906505, S2CID 13470826
- Padgett, Jaye (2003b), "The Emergence of Contrastive Palatalization in Russian", in Holt, D. Eric (ed.), Optimality Theory and Language Change
- Sakhno, Serguei. Dictionnaire russe-français d'étymologie comparée: correspondences lexicales historiques. Paris: L'Harmattan, 2001 – ISBN 2-7475-0219-8
- Schenker, Alexander M. (2002), "Proto-Slavonic", in Comrie, Bernard; Corbett, Greville. G. (eds.), The Slavonic Languages, London: Routledge, pp. 60–124, ISBN 0-415-28078-8
- Vasmer, Max. Этимологический словарь русского языка [= Etymological dictionary of the Russian language]. Trans. & expanded by Oleg Trubachov. 4 vols. Moscow: Прогресс, 1959–1961; 1964–73.
- Vinogradov, V. V., История Слов:Суть
- Vinokur, G. O. (2010). Forsyth, James; Forsyth, Mary A. (eds.). The Russian Language: A Brief History (2nd ed.). New York: Cambridge University Press. p. 160. ISBN 978-0-521-13154-4.
- Vlasto, Alexis Peter. A linguistic history of Russia to the end of the eighteenth century. Oxford: Clarendon, 1988.
- Wade, Terence. Russian etymological dictionary. Bristol: Bristol Classical Press, 1996 – ISBN 1-85399-414-6
