= Ruthenian language =

Historical Slavic language, precursor of Belarusian and Ukrainian

Ruthenian
- Native to: East Slavic regions of the Polish–Lithuanian Commonwealth
- Extinct: Developed into Belarusian, Rusyn, and Ukrainian
- Language family: Indo-European: Balto-Slavic; Slavic; East Slavic; Ruthenian
- Early forms: Proto-Indo-European: Proto-Balto-Slavic; Proto-Slavic; Old East Slavic

Official status
- Official language in: Grand Duchy of Lithuania (later replaced by Polish)

Language codes
- ISO 639-3: None (mis)
- Linguist List: orv-olr
- Glottolog: None

Ruthenian (see also other names) was a written language used from the 14th to the 18th centuries within the East Slavic-speaking regions of the Grand Duchy of Lithuania and later the Polish-Lithuanian Commonwealth. Literary Ruthenian is considered to be a historical precursor to the modern Belarusian and Ukrainian languages (occasionally also to Rusyn), although neither standard language directly continues the Ruthenian written tradition.

Several linguistic issues are debated among linguists: various questions related to classification of literary and vernacular varieties of this language; issues related to meanings and proper uses of various endonymic (native) and exonymic (foreign) glottonyms (names of languages and linguistic varieties); questions on its relation to modern East Slavic languages, and its relation to Old East Slavic (the colloquial language used in Kievan Rus' in the 10th through 13th centuries).

== Nomenclature ==
A fragment from the 1588 codification of Lithuanian law, regulating the official use of the rusky language (рꙋскиⸯ єзыкь).

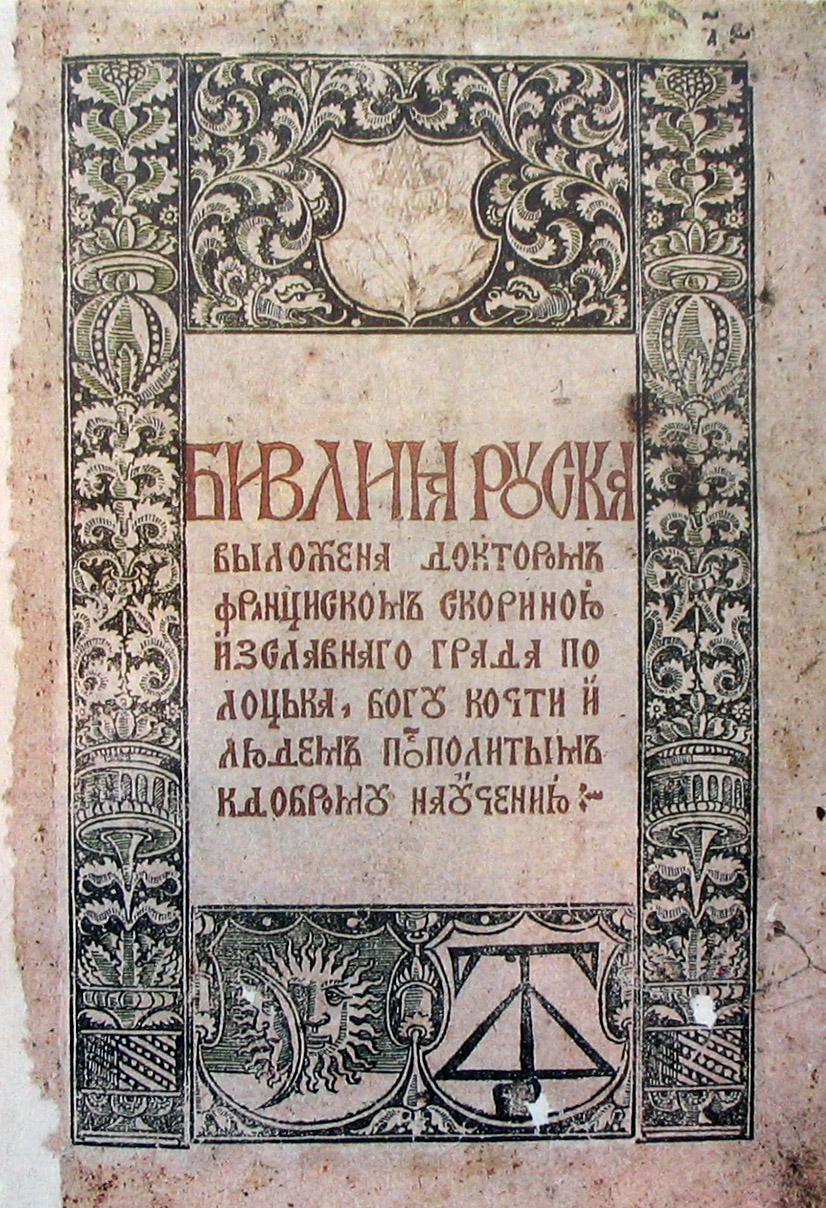
Ruthenian Bible printed in 1517

Since the term Ruthenian language was exonymic (foreign, both in origin and nature), its use was very complex, both in historical and modern scholarly terminology.

=== Names in historical use ===
Contemporary names, that were used for this language from the 15th to 18th centuries, can be divided into two basic linguistic categories, the first being endonyms (native names, used by native speakers as self-designations for their language), and the second exonyms (names in foreign languages).

Common endonyms:

- Ruska(ja) mova, written in various ways, as: ру́скаꙗ мо́ва, and also as: ру́скїй ѧзы́къ (ruskiy jazyk').
- Prosta(ja) mova (meaning: the simple speech, or the simple talk), also written in various ways, as: проста(ѧ) мова or простй ѧзыкъ (Old Belarusian / Old Ukrainian: простый руский (язык) or простая молва, проста мова) – publisher Hryhorii Khodkevych (16th century). Those terms for simple vernacular speech were designating its diglossic opposition to literary Church Slavonic.

Common exonyms:

- in Latin: lingua ruthenica, or lingua ruthena, which is rendered in English as: Ruthenian or Ruthene language.

=== Names in modern use ===
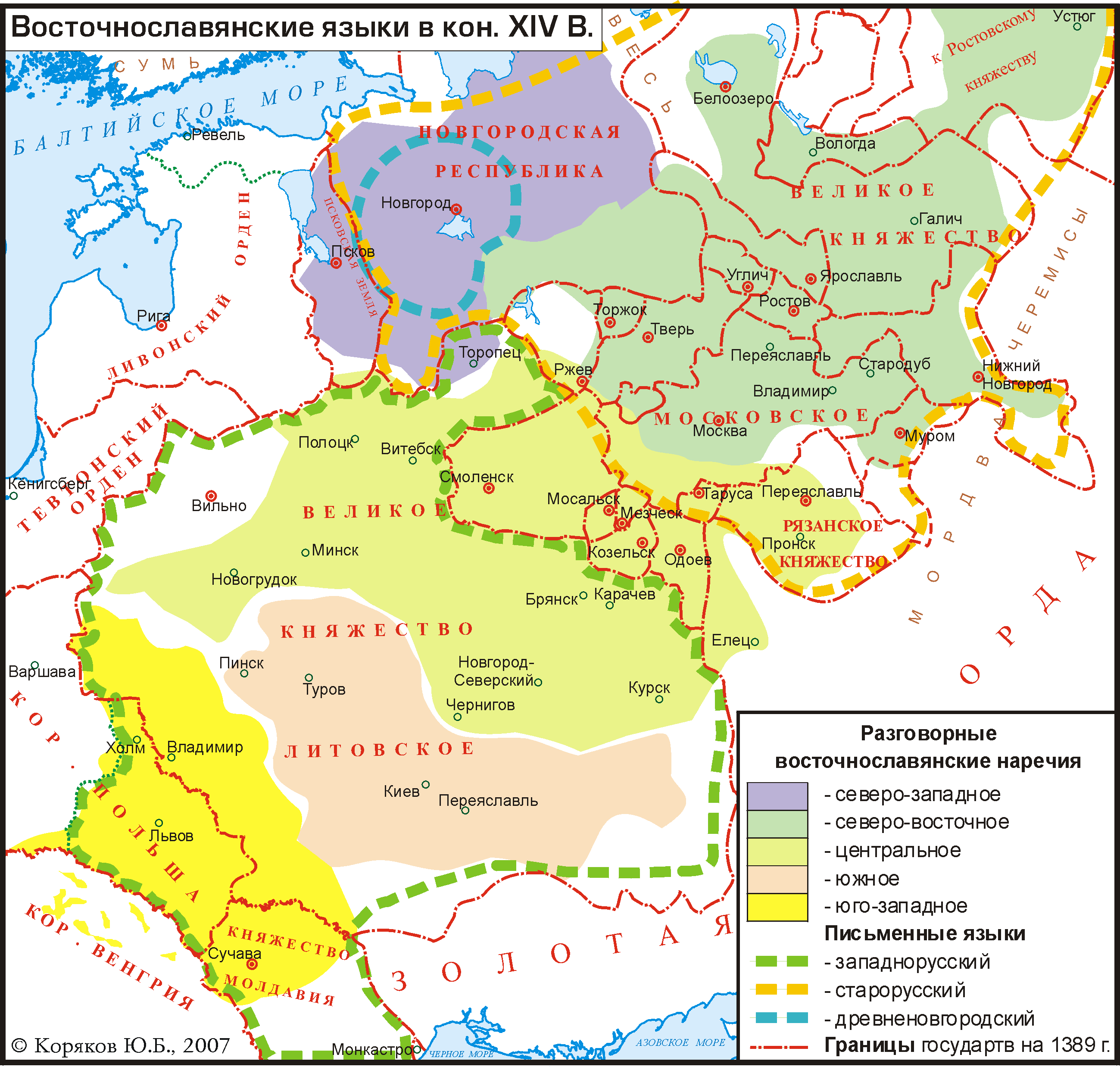
East Slavic languages in 1389. Colors represent spoken dialects. Dashed lines represent written languages: Written Early Ruthenian Written Old/Middle Russian Written Old Novgorodian

Modern names of this language and its varieties, that are used by scholars (mainly linguists), can also be divided in two basic categories, the first including those that are derived from endonymic (native) names, and the second encompassing those that are derived from exonymic (foreign) names.

Names derived from endonymic terms:

- One "s" terms: Rus’ian, Rusian, Rusky or Ruski, employed explicitly with only one letter "s" in order to distinguish this name from terms that are designating modern Russian.
- Old Belarusian language (Belarusian: Старабеларуская мова, romanized: Starabiełaruskaja mova) – term used by various Belarusian and some Russian scholars, and also by Kryzhanich. The denotation Belarusian (language) (Russian: белорусский (язык)) when referring both to the post-19th-century language and to the older language had been used in works of the 19th-century Russian researchers Fyodor Buslayev, Ogonovskiy, Zhitetskiy, Sobolevskiy, Nedeshev, Vladimirov and Belarusian researchers, such as Karskiy.
- Old Ukrainian language (Ukrainian: Староукраїнська мова, romanized: Staroukrajinsjka mova) – term used by various Ukrainian and some other scholars. This term is distinguished from Давньоукраїнська мова, Davnjoukrajinsjka mova, which might be translated as "Ancient Ukrainian language", and refers to Old East Slavic. Foreign linguists tend to prefer "Middle Ukrainian" for this stage of the Ukrainian language, comparable to Middle Polish and Middle Russian.
- Lithuanian-Rus' language (Russian: литовско-русский язык, romanized: litovsko-russkij jazyk) – regionally oriented designation, used by some 19th-century Russian researchers such as: Keppen, archbishop Filaret, Sakharov, Karatayev.
- Lithuanian-Slavic language (Russian: литово-славянский язык, romanized: litovo-slavjanskij) – another regionally oriented designation, used by 19th-century Russian researcher Baranovskiy.
- Chancery Slavonic, or Chancery Slavic – a term used for the written form, based on Old Church Slavonic, but influenced by various local dialects and used in the chancery of Grand Duchy of Lithuania.
- West Russian or Western Rus' language or dialect (Russian: западнорусский язык, romanized: zapadnorusskij jazyk, западнорусское наречие zapadnorusskoye narechie) – terms used mainly by supporters of the concept of the Proto-Russian phase, especially since the end of the 19th century. Employed by authors such as Karskiy and Shakhmatov. Outside Russia, these terms are no longer commonly used, and regarded as pejorative or even imperialist, particularly in Belarus and Ukraine. A noticeable shift already occurred in the late Soviet period, when the Lithuanian Chronicles, still called Western Rus' Chronicles (Zapadnorusskie letopisi) in PSRL Volume 17 (1907), were rebranded Belarusian–Lithuanian Chronicles (Belorussko-litovskie letopisi) in PSRL Volumes 32 (1975) and 35 (1980).

Names derived from exonymic terms:

- Ruthenian or Ruthene language – modern scholarly terms, derived from older Latin exonyms (Latin: lingua ruthenica, lingua ruthena), commonly used by scholars who are writing in English and other western languages, and also by various Lithuanian and Polish scholars.
- Ruthenian literary language, or Literary Ruthenian language – terms used by the same groups of scholars in order to designate more precisely the literary variety of this language.
- Ruthenian chancery language, or Chancery Ruthenian language – terms used by the same groups of scholars in order to designate more precisely the chancery variety of this language, used in official and legal documents of the Grand Duchy of Lithuania.
- Ruthenian common language, or Common Ruthenian language – terms used by the same groups of scholars in order to designate more precisely the vernacular variety of this language.
- North Ruthenian dialect or language – a term used by some scholars as designation for northern varieties, that gave rise to modern Belarusian language, that is also designated as White Ruthenian.
- South Ruthenian dialect or language – a term used by some scholars as designation for southern varieties, that gave rise to modern Ukrainian language, that is also designated as Red Ruthenian.

Terminological dichotomy, embodied in parallel uses of various endoymic and exonymic terms, resulted in a vast variety of ambiguous, overlapping or even contrary meanings, that were applied to particular terms by different scholars. That complex situation is addressed by most English and other western scholars by preferring the exonymic Ruthenian designations.

== Periodization ==
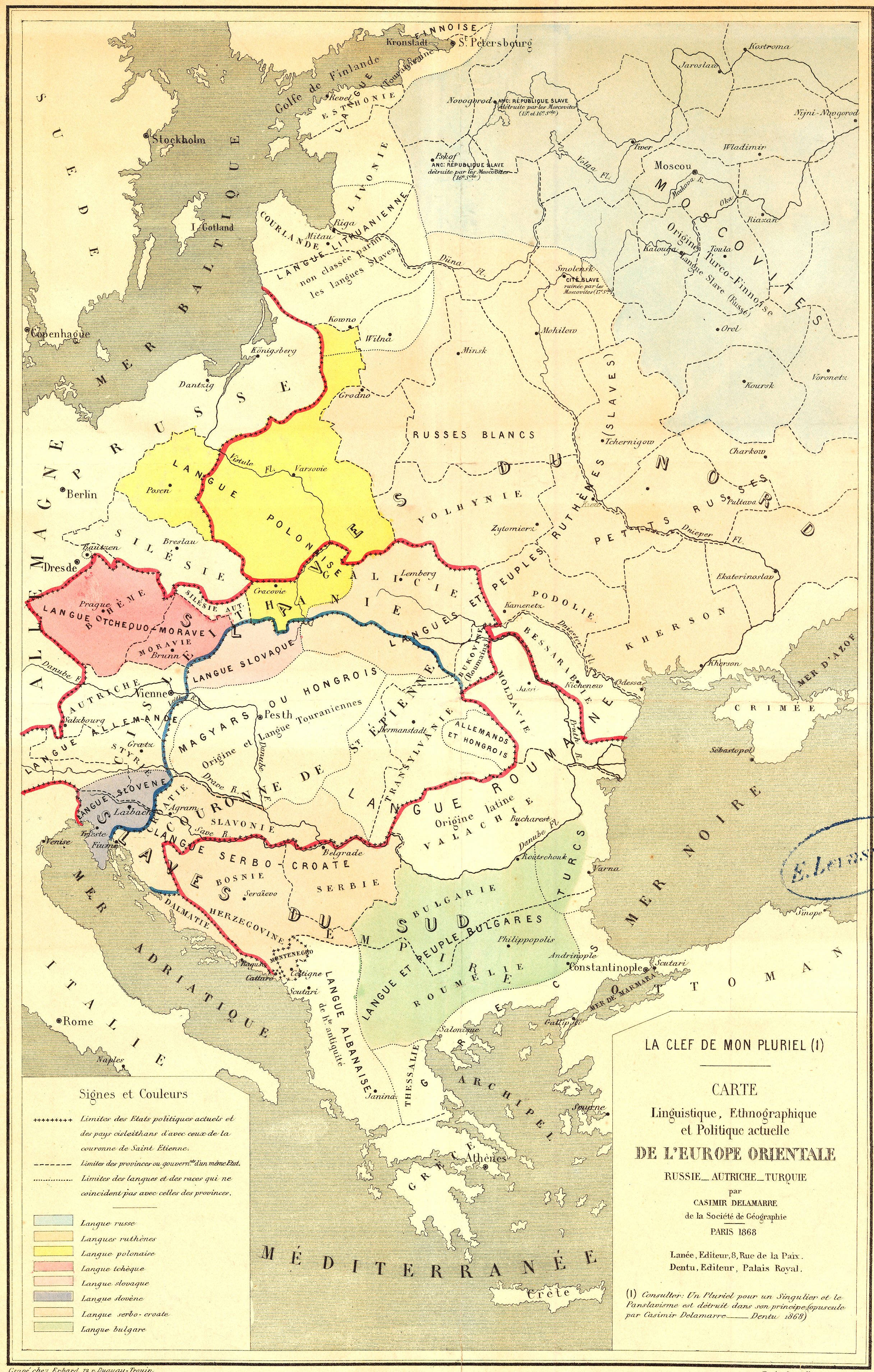
Linguistic, ethnographic, and political map of Eastern Europe by Casimir Delamarre, 1868 Ruthenians and Ruthenian language

Daniel Bunčić suggested a periodization of the literary language into:

1. Early Ruthenian, dating from the separation of Lithuanian and Muscovite chancery languages (15th century) to the early 16th century
2. High Ruthenian, from Francysk Skaryna (fl. 1517–25), to Ivan Uzhevych (Hramatyka slovenskaia, 1643, 1645)
3. Late Ruthenian, from 1648 to the establishment of the Ukrainian and Belarusian standard languages at the end of the 18th century

== Development ==
=== Early Ruthenian (c. 1300–1550) ===
According to linguist Andrii Danylenko (2006), what is now called 'Ruthenian' first arose as a primarily administrative language in the 14th and 15th centuries, shaped by the chancery of the Grand Duchy of Lithuania in Vilnius (Vilna). (Note: It is unknown when Vilnius emerged as capital of the Grand Duchy of Lithuania, but its oldest mentions in texts date to the Letters of Gediminas of the early 1320s.) He identified the Polissian (Polesian) dialect spoken on both sides of the modern Belarusian–Ukrainian border as the basis of both written Ruthenian (rusьkij jazykъ or Chancery Slavonic) and spoken dialects of Ruthenian (проста(я) мова prosta(ja) mova or "simple speech"), which he called 'two stylistically differentiated varieties of one secular vernacular standard'.

From the second half of the 15th century through the 16th century, when present-day Ukraine and Belarus were part of the Grand Duchy of Lithuania, the Renaissance had a major impact on shifting culture, art and literature away from Byzantine Christian theocentrism as expressed in Church Slavonic. Instead, they moved towards humanist anthropocentrism, which in writing was increasingly expressed by taking the vernacular language of the common people as the basis of texts. New literary genres developed that were closer to secular topics, such as poetry, polemical literature, and scientific literature, while Church Slavonic works of previous times were translated into what became known as Ruthenian, Chancery Slavonic, or Old Ukrainian (also called проста мова prosta mova or "simple language" since the 14th century). It is virtually impossible to differentiate Ruthenian texts into "Ukrainian" and "Belarusian" subgroups until the 16th century; with some variety, these were all functionally one language between the 14th and 16th century.

=== High Ruthenian (c. 1550–1650) ===
The vernacular Ruthenian "official/business speech" (Ukrainian: ділове мовлення, romanized: dilove movlennya; Belarusian: дзелавое маўленне, romanized: dzielavoje maŭliennie) of the 16th century would spread to most other domains of everyday communication in the 17th century, with an influx of words, expressions and style from Polish and other European languages, while the usage of Church Slavonic became more restricted to the affairs of religion, the church, hagiography, and some forms of art and science.

The 1569 Union of Lublin establishing the Polish–Lithuanian Commonwealth had significant linguistic implications: the Crown of the Kingdom of Poland (which now included Ukraine) had previously used Latin for administration, but switched to Middle Polish (standardised c. 1569–1648), while the Grand Duchy of Lithuania (including Belarus, but no longer Ukraine) gave up Chancery Slavonic (Ruthenian) and also switched to Middle Polish. Much of the Polish and Ruthenian nobility briefly converted to various kinds of Protestantism during the Reformation, but in the end all of them either returned or converted to Catholicism and increasingly used the Polish language; while Ukrainian nobles thus Polonised, most Ukrainian (and Belarusian) peasants remained Orthodox-believing and Ruthenian-speaking.

=== Late Ruthenian (c. 1650–1800) ===
When the Cossack Hetmanate arose in the mid-17th century, Polish remained a language of administration in the Hetmanate, and most Cossack officers and Polish nobles (two groups which overlapped a lot) still communicated with each other using a combination of Latin, Polish and Ruthenian. On the other hand, the language barrier between Cossack officers and Muscovite officials had become so great that they needed translators to understand each other during negotiations, and hetman Bohdan Khmelnytsky 'had letters in Muscovite dialect translated into Latin, so that he could read them.'

The 17th century witnessed the standardisation of the Ruthenian language that would later split into modern Ukrainian and Belarusian. From the 16th century onwards, two regional variations of spoken Ruthenian began to emerge as written Ruthenian gradually lost its prestige to Polish in administration. The spoken prosta(ja) mova disappeared in the early 18th century, to be replaced by a more Polonised (central) early Belarusian variety and a more Slavonicised (southwestern) early Ukrainian variety. Meanwhile, Church Slavonic remained the literary and administrative standard in Russia until the late 18th century.

== See also ==
- Church Slavonic in Romania
- Linguonym
- Slavic studies
- Galicia (Eastern Europe)
- Ruthenian Uniate Church

== Literature ==
- Borzecki, Jerzy (1996). Concepts of Belarus until 1918 (PDF). Toronto: University of Toronto.
- Brock, Peter (1972). "Ivan Vahylevych (1811–1866) and the Ukrainian National Identity". Canadian Slavonic Papers. 14 (2): 153–190. doi:10.1080/00085006.1972.11091271. JSTOR 40866428.
- Brogi Bercoff, Giovanna (1995). "Plurilinguism in Eastern Slavic Culture of the 17th Century: The case of Simeon Polockij". Slavia: Časopis pro slovanskou filologii. 64: 3–14.
- Bunčić, Daniel (2006). Die ruthenische Schriftsprache bei Ivan Uževyč unter besonderer Berücksichtigung seines Gesprächsbuchs Rozmova/Besěda: Mit Wörterverzeichnis und Indizes zu seinem ruthenischen und kirchenslavischen Gesamtwerk. München: Verlag Otto Sagner.
- Bunčić, Daniel (2015). "On the dialectal basis of the Ruthenian literary language" (PDF). Die Welt der Slaven. 60 (2): 276–289.
- Danylenko, Andrii (2004). "The name Rus': In search of a new dimension". Jahrbücher für Geschichte Osteuropas. 52 (1): 1–32.
- Danylenko, Andrii (2006a). "Prostaja Mova, Kitab, and Polissian Standard". Die Welt der Slaven. 51 (1): 80–115.
- Danylenko, Andrii (2006b). "On the Name(s) of the Prostaja Mova in the Polish–Lithuanian Commonwealth". Studia Slavica. 51 (1/2): 97–121. doi:10.1556/SSlav.51.2006.1-2.6.
- Dingley, James (1972). "The Two Versions of the Gramatyka Slovenskaja of Ivan Uževič" (PDF). The Journal of Byelorussian Studies. 2 (4): 369–384.
- Frick, David A. (1985). "Meletij Smotryc'kyj and the Ruthenian Language Question". Harvard Ukrainian Studies. 9 (1/2): 25–52. JSTOR 41036131.
- Halperin, Charles J. (2022). The Rise and Demise of the Myth of the Rus' Land (PDF). Leeds: Arc Humanities Press. p. 116. ISBN 9781802700565. Archived from the original (PDF) on 12 July 2024.
- Leeming, Harry (1974). "The Language of the Kucieina New Testament and Psalter of 1652" (PDF). The Journal of Byelorussian Studies. 3 (2): 123–144.
- Мозер, Михаэль А. (2002). "Что такое «простая мова»?". Studia Slavica. 47 (3/4): 221–260. doi:10.1556/SSlav.47.2002.3-4.1.
- Moser, Michael A. (2005). "Mittelruthenisch (Mittelweißrussisch und Mittelukrainisch): Ein Überblick". Studia Slavica. 50 (1/2): 125–142. doi:10.1556/SSlav.50.2005.1-2.11.
- Moser, Michael A. (2017). "Too Close to the West? The Ruthenian Language of the Instruction of 1609". Ukraine and Europe: Cultural Encounters and Negotiations. Toronto: University of Toronto Press. pp. 119–135. ISBN 9781487500900.
- Moser, Michael A. (2018). "The Fate of the Ruthenian or Little Russian (Ukrainian) Language in Austrian Galicia (1772-1867)". Harvard Ukrainian Studies. 35 (2017–2018) (1/4): 87–104. JSTOR 44983536.
- Moser, Michael (2020). "Middle Ruthenian". Encyclopedia of Slavic Languages and Linguistics Online. Brill. doi:10.1163/2589-6229_ESLO_COM_032436.
- Peredriyenko, V. A. (2001). "Староукраїнська проста мова ХУІ – ХУІІІ ст. в контексті формування національної літературної мови" [The 17th–18th-century Old Ukrainian vernacular in context of national literary language formation]. Актуальні проблеми української лінгвістики: теорія і практика (in Ukrainian) (4). Taras Shevchenko National University of Kyiv: 16–23. ISSN 2311-2697.
- Pivtorak, Hryhorij. "Do pytannja pro ukrajins’ko-bilorus’ku vzajemodiju donacional’noho periodu (dosjahnennja, zavdannja i perspektyvy doslidžen’)". In: Movoznavstvo 1978.3 (69), p. 31–40.
- Pugh, Stefan M. (1985). "The Ruthenian Language of Meletij Smotryc'kyj: Phonology". Harvard Ukrainian Studies. 9 (1/2): 53–60. JSTOR 41036132.
- Pugh, Stefan M. (1996). Testament to Ruthenian: A Linguistic Analysis of the Smotryc'kyj Variant. Cambridge, Mass.: Harvard University Press. ISBN 9780916458751.
- Pugh, Stefan M. (2007). A New Historical Grammar of the East Slavic Languages. Volume 1: Introduction and Phonology. Lincom Europa. ISBN 9783895860133.
- Shevelov, George Y. (1974). "Belorussian versus Ukrainian: Delimitation of Texts before A.D. 1569" (PDF). The Journal of Byelorussian Studies. 3 (2): 145–156.
- Shevelov, George Y. (1979). A Historical Phonology of the Ukrainian Language. Heidelberg: Carl Winter. ISBN 9783533027867.
- Snyder, Timothy D. (2003). The Reconstruction of Nations: Poland, Ukraine, Lithuania, Belarus, 1569–1999. Yale University Press. p. 384. ISBN 978-0-300-10586-5.
- Stang, Christian S. (1935). Die Westrussische Kanzleisprache des Grossfürstentums Litauen. Oslo: Dybwad.
- Struminskyj, Bohdan (1984). "The language question in the Ukrainian lands before the nineteenth century". Aspects of the Slavic language question. Vol. 2. New Haven: Yale Concilium on International and Area Studies. pp. 9–47. ISBN 9780936586045.
- Verkholantsev, Julia (2008). Ruthenica Bohemica: Ruthenian Translations from Czech in the Grand Duchy of Lithuania and Poland. Berlin: LIT. ISBN 9783825804657.
- Waring, Alan G. (1980). "The Influence of Non-Linguistic Factors on the Rise and Fall of the Old Byelorussian Literary Language" (PDF). The Journal of Byelorussian Studies. 4 (3/4): 129–147.
