= Old Pskov dialect =

Old Russian dialect

- Old Pskovian
- Native to: Pskov Republic
- Language family: Indo-European: Balto-Slavic; Slavic; East Slavic; Old Pskov dialect
- Early forms: Proto-Indo-European: Proto-Balto-Slavic; Proto-Slavic
- Writing system: Cyrillic

Language codes
- ISO 639-3: –
- Glottolog: None

The Old Pskov dialect (Russian: древнепсковский диалект, romanized: drevnepskovsky dialekt), also known as Old Pskovian, was spoken in the Pskov Republic. It is closely related to the Old Novgorod dialect, which had features that are notably different from other East Slavic varieties. As a result, the two are considered to be subdialects of the same branch. The Novgorod-Pskov dialect is also referred to as (Early) North Russian and Northwest Old Russian.

According to Andrey Zaliznyak, together with the Old Novgorod dialect, it formed a cluster of closely related dialects which converge with the other East Slavic dialects only in the Proto-Slavic stage. For instance, the second regressive palatalization left no traces in the Novgorod-Pskov dialect (e.g. kěle 'whole' as opposed to Old Church Slavonic cělъ).

== History ==
Andrey Zaliznyak says that "supra-dialectal Old Russian" was unified until the end of the 13th century, but from the 14th century, in the region later known as Great Russia, the chancery tradition of Vladimir-Suzdal and Moscow became the main carrier of "supra-dialectal Old Russian".

The Novgorod-Pskov dialect had notable differences to "supra-dialectal Old Russian", while the convergence of the western and eastern dialects of the Novgorod Land took place with the rise of Novgorod as a political center. The eastern dialects were comparatively close to "supra-dialectal Old Russian", while the western dialects, close to Pskov, were distinct. Novgorod itself was located in the transitional zone, with its dialect based on the western dialects but with some influence of the eastern dialects. This mixed dialect served a koiné function as a result.

According to Willem Vermeer, there is some evidence that a variety of Slavic spoken in the Russian North was isolated from the other Slavic varieties by a broad belt of Baltic-speaking populations. Once contact with the other Slavic varieties was re-established, North Russian resumed its participation in Common Slavic linguistic development. He also says that a Finnic substratum may have played a role.

In the 13th to 15th centuries, there was a marked displacement of the specific features of the dialect in the context of increasing inter-dialectal contacts in the territory later known as Great Russia. This process accelerated after 1478, when Novgorod and subsequently Pskov lost their independence. The dialect disintegrated into a number of independently developing dialect groups, which merged into the all-Russian dialect continuum.

== Sources ==
- Hendriks, Pepijn (10 May 2014). Innovation in Tradition: Tönnies Fonne's Russian-German Phrasebook (Pskov, 1607). Rodopi. p. 34. ISBN 978-94-012-1075-1.
- Vermeer, Willem (1994). "On Explaining Why the Early North Russian Nominative Singular in -e Does Not Palatalize Stem-Final Velars". Russian Linguistics. 18 (2): 145–157. ISSN 0304-3487.
- Wandl, Florian (2020). "On the relative chronology of the II regressive and the progressive palatalizations of Common Slavic - Об относительной хронологии второй регрессивной и прогрессивной палатализаций общеславянского языка". Russian Linguistics. 44 (1): 79–108. ISSN 0304-3487.
- Zaliznyak, Andrey A. (2004). Древненовгородский диалект [Old Novgorodian dialect] (2nd ed.). Moscow: Языки славянской культуры. ISBN 5-94457-165-9.
- Zaliznyak, Andrey A.; Sheveleva, M. N. (2017). "Древненовгородский диалект". Языки мира: Славянские языки [Languages of the world: the Slavic languages] (2nd ed.). Saint Petersburg: Nestor. pp. 476–540. ISBN 978-5-4469-0830-1.
