= Old Novgorod dialect =

Old Russian dialect

- Old Novgorodian
- Native to: Novgorod Republic
- Era: 11th–15th centuries
- Language family: Indo-European: Balto-Slavic; Slavic; East Slavic; Old Novgorod dialect
- Early forms: Proto-Indo-European: Proto-Balto-Slavic; Proto-Slavic
- Dialects: Pskov†
- Writing system: Cyrillic

Language codes
- ISO 639-3: –
- Glottolog: None

The Old Novgorod dialect (Russian: древненовгородский диалект, romanized: drevnenovgorodskiy dialekt, lit. 'ancient Novgorodian dialect'), also known as Old Novgorodian, was the East Slavic variety used in the city of Veliky Novgorod and its surrounding area. It is mainly known from medieval birch bark writings dating from the 11th to 15th centuries. According to Andrey Zaliznyak, together with the Old Pskov dialect, it formed a cluster of closely related dialects which converge with the other East Slavic dialects only in the Proto-Slavic stage. The Novgorod-Pskov dialect is also referred to as (Early) North Russian and Northwest Old Russian. Zaliznyak distinguished it from "supra-dialectal Old Russian".

The Old Novgorod dialect is characterized by its linguistic conservatism, resisting changes and retaining over centuries older forms that eventually became archaisms to other Slavic dialects. For example, the birch bark letters from the Novgorod-Pskov area attest that the second palatalization failed to reach this area. Other manuscripts have also shown distinct north Russian dialect forms, in addition to the birch bark letters. Furthermore, the letters provide unique evidence of the Slavic vernacular, as opposed to the Church Slavonic, which dominated the written literature of the period. Most of the letters feature informal writing such as personal correspondence, instructions, complaints, news, and reminders. Such widespread usage indicates a high level of literacy, even among women and children. The preserved notes display the original spelling of the time; unlike some texts, they were not copied, rewritten or edited by later scribes.

Today, the study of Novgorodian birch bark letters is an established scholarly field in Russian historical linguistics, with far-ranging historical and archaeological implications for the study of the Russian Middle Ages.

== Classification ==
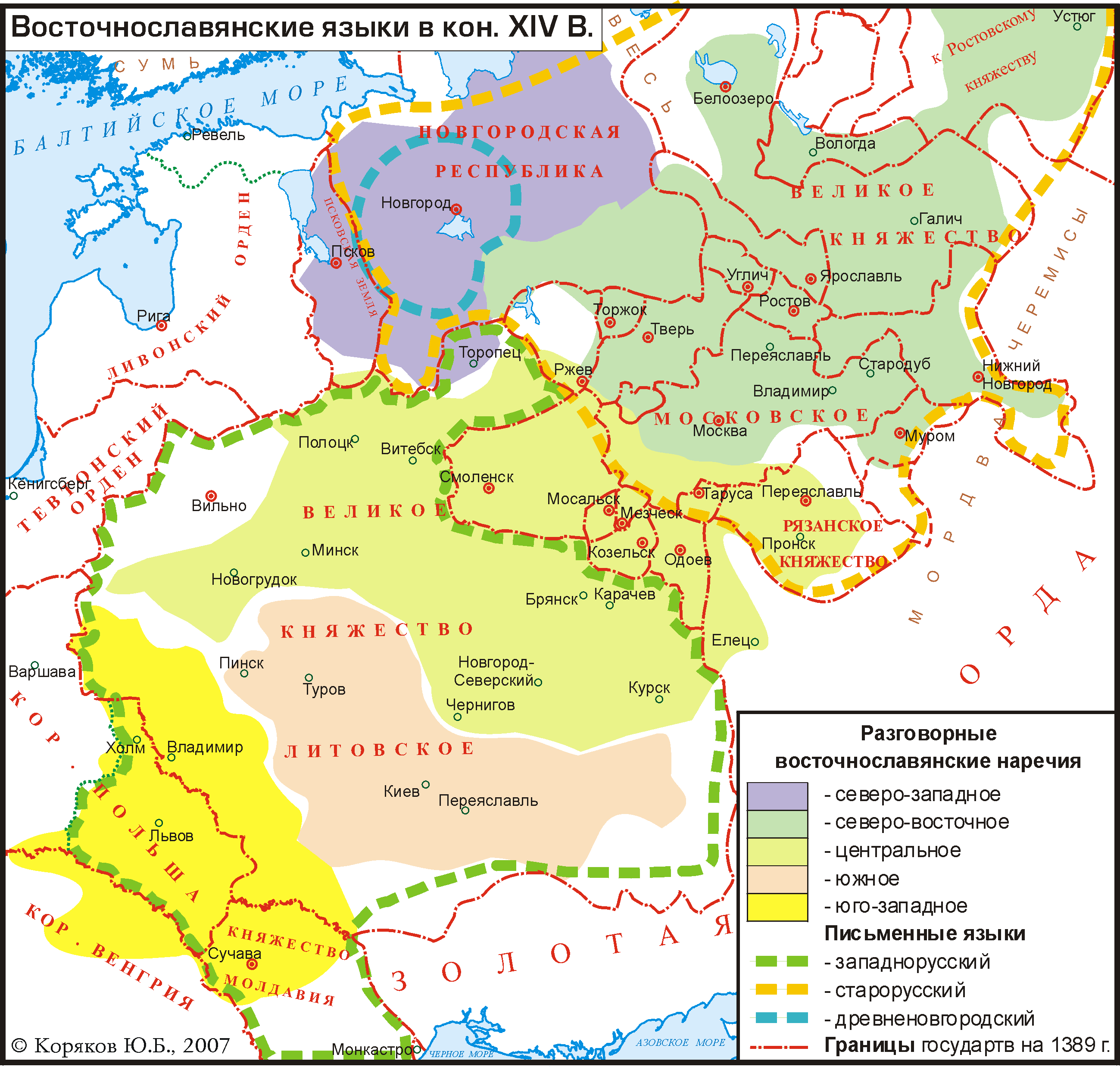
East Slavic languages in 1389. Colors represent spoken dialects. Dashed lines represent written languages: Written Ruthenian Written Middle Russian Written Old Novgorodian

The mainstream view is that the Old Novgorod dialect is an East Slavic variety that has some significant deviations from what Andrey Zaliznyak called "supra-dialectal Old Russian", although there have been some attempts to classify it as a separate branch of the Slavic languages.

As Church Slavonic was used in liturgical and religious writing, while a supra-regional variety was used for trade, it is unclear to what extent Novgorodians at the time would have considered them to have been separate languages or distinct registers of a single language. In addition, there is some variation in birch bark letters due to a lack of standardization that is seen with modern literary languages. Some texts are also written with a mixture of Church Slavonic and Old Novgorodian, but most are written in a pure vernacular. The language found in the birch bark manuscripts represents the closest approximation to vernacular Old Russian language, as opposed to the formal language used in chronicles.

== Development ==
The Novgorod-Pskov dialect had notable differences to "supra-dialectal Old Russian", while the convergence of the western and eastern dialects of the Novgorod Land took place with the rise of Novgorod as a political center. The eastern dialects were comparatively close to "supra-dialectal Old Russian", while the western dialects, close to Pskov, were distinct. Novgorod itself was located in the transitional zone, with its dialect based on the western dialects but with some influence of the eastern dialects. This mixed dialect served a koiné function as a result.

According to one theory, an East Slavic tribe who inhabited the Novgorod-Pskov region, the Krivichi, had separated from the main body of Proto-East Slavic speakers at the beginning of the Migration Period, and contact with the other tribes was not re-established until those tribes moved northward. This led to the northern Russian dialects resuming their participation in Common Slavic linguistic development. Some scholars have attributed tsokanye to a Finno-Ugric substratum, with this innovation occurring in the northwestern Russian dialects and roughly corresponding to the domain of the Novgorod Republic. Other innovations include the second pleophony that differentiate parts of the northwestern Russian dialects from each other.

In the 13th to 15th centuries, there was a marked displacement of the specific features of the Old Novgorod dialect in the context of increasing inter-dialectal contacts in the territory later known as Great Russia. This process accelerated after 1478, when Novgorod lost its independence. The Old Novgorod dialect disintegrated into a number of independently developing dialect groups, which merged into the all-Russian dialect continuum.

== Research history ==
The first birch bark letter, called N1, (Note: The N stands for Novgorod) was found in the city of Novgorod on July 26, 1951, by Nina Fedorovna Akulova. It was written in what is now called Old Novgorodian. As of 2018, a total of 1,222 items have been discovered in 12 cities, of which 1,113 were found in Novgorod. Nearly all others have been found in nearby cities, including 49 in Staraya Russa and 19 in Torzhok. Among the most notable letters found is N202 discovered in 1956, which was written by a young boy called Onfim who lived in Novgorod and is dated to the 13th century.

In Russian, the study of birch bark letters is informally known as berestologiya. It is unknown how many birch bark letters have gone undiscovered; less than three percent of the city of Novgorod has been systematically excavated. V.L. Janin, the head of the Novgorod Archaeological Expedition, estimated that more than 20,000 remain to be discovered in Novgorod alone. Although the birch bark letters do not contain explicit dates, archaeologists have been able to date them with an accuracy of 10 to 15 years using methods including stratigraphy and dendrochronology. They can be dated even more precisely if historical names or events are mentioned.

Almost all of them were written with styluses of bronze and iron, and never ink. The letters were preserved due to the swampy soil which isolated them from oxygen. Many letters are found buried amidst the layers under streets which were previously paved with logs.

== Linguistic features ==
The short birch-bark texts are written in a peculiar Slavic vernacular, reflecting living speech, and almost entirely free of the heavy Church Slavonic influence seen in the literary language of the period. Some of the observed linguistic features are not found in any other Slavic dialect, representing important Proto-Slavic archaisms.

Zaliznyak differentiates the Old Novgorod features that were already known before the discovery of the birch bark letters and those that have been ascertained after their study during the last few decades such as the following:

1. Ts–ch merger (tsokanye)
2. secondary pleophony, e.g. мълъвити as opposed to мълвити
3. retention of stem-final *x in Proto-Slavic *vьx- "all" (spelled вехь) whereas other Slavic languages have undergone the third progressive palatalization, e.g. вьхо (Zaliznyak (1995:38–39))
4. lack of the Slavic second palatalization in root-final position, e.g. рукѣ, моги
5. the change vl’ > l’, e.g. Яколь, Яковлев
6. nominative singular masculine of o-stems -e, e.g. Иване, посаднике, хлѣбе (Note: Instead of -ъ found in all the other Slavic dialects and reconstructed for Late Proto-Slavic, and that has been subsequently lost in a weak word-final position; e.g. Old Novgorod dialect brate "brother" : modern Russian brat.)
7. genitive singular of а-stems in "soft" -ě, instead of the "hard" -y, e.g. бес кунѣ. The same substitution is found in the accusative plural of o-stems and a-stems.
8. replacement of "hard" и by their "soft" counterparts in other non-nominal cases, such as the dual and plural of the imperative, nominative singular masculine of the present active participle, and pronominal endings (e.g. тиxъ instead of *тѣxъ)
9. absence of palatalization of the stem with the new -ѣ and -и desinences, as in Old East Slavic
10. nominative-accusative plural of а-stems in -ě, e.g. кобылѣ, сиротѣ

Features of the Old Novgorod dialect ascertained by the philological study in the last decades are:

1. lack of the Slavic second palatalization in root-initial position, e.g. кѣл-, хѣр-
2. a particular reflex of Proto-Slavic *TьRT, *TъRT clusters, yielding TьRьT, TъRъT. However, in some dialects these yielded TroT, TreT.
3. West-Slavic-like reflex of *TоRT clusters, e.g. погродье versus погородие
4. the change ml’ > n’, e.g. емлючи > енючи
5. no merger of nominative and accusative singular of masculines regardless of animacy, e.g. Nom. sg. погосте : Acc. sg. на погостъ
6. Proto-Slavic *kv, *gv clusters were retained as in West Slavic languages instead of being transformed to cv, zv before front vowels as in other East Slavic dialects

Often the orthography is domestic (as opposed to bookish), using ъ and о on the one hand and ь and е on the other synonymously (about 50% of birchbark manuscripts from the mid-12th to the late 14th century).

The Novgorod material is divided by Zaliznyak into seven chronological groups:

Periodization of Old Novgorod birchbark letters by A. Zaliznyak
Class	Period
A	11th century to approx. 1125
B I	approx. 1125–1160
B II	approx. 1125–1160
C	1220s–1290s
D I	approx. 1300–1360
D II	approx. 1360–1400
E	15th century

== Implications of Old Novgorod findings ==
According to Zaliznyak, the Old Novgorod linguistic features, instead of being merely isolated deviations, represent a bundle of peculiar isoglosses. The deviations are more abundant in older birch bark letters than in the more recent finds. This fact indicates, contrary to what may be expected, that the development was convergent rather than divergent, with regard to other northern East Slavic dialects.

According to Zaliznyak, the discovery of Old Novgorod dialect suggests that earlier conceptions which held East Slavic as a relatively homogeneous linguistic grouping, have been dispelled by a view advancing it instead as an area of much greater dialectal diversity. Zaliznyak divides the East Slavic area into two dialectal groupings: Proto-Novgorodian-Pskovian on one side, singled out chiefly on the basis of two instances lacking second palatalization of velars and the ending -e in nominative singular of masculine o-stems, and all the remaining East Slavic dialects on the other.

== Examples ==
=== A criminal case: Novgorod birch-bark letter no. 109 ===
Dated between the end of the 11th century and the 1110s; excavated 1954.

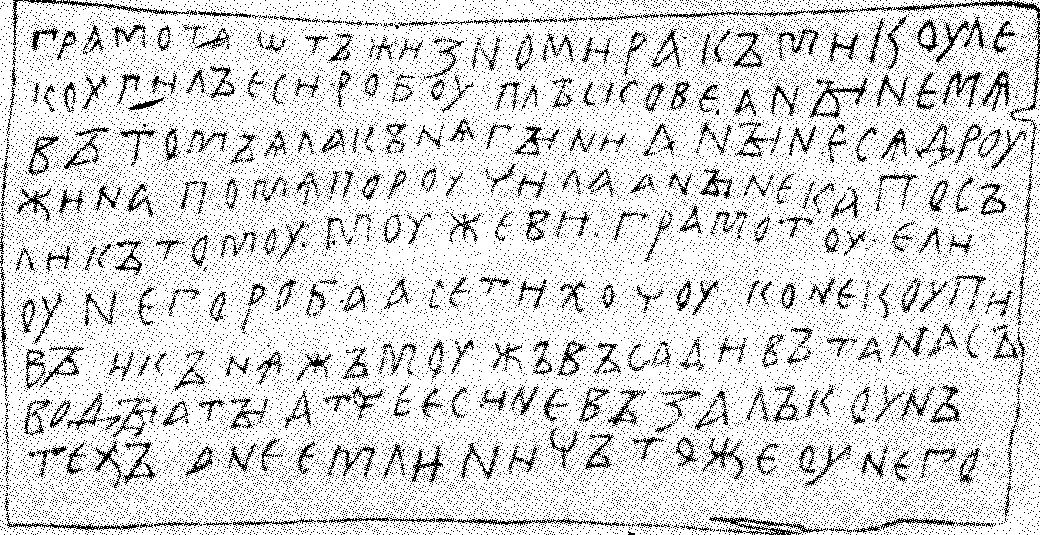
Birch-bark letter no. 109, c. 1100, Novgorod; outline

Original text (with added word division):

грамота ѡтъ жизномира къ микоуле
коупилъ еси робоу плъскове а ныне мѧ
въ томъ ѧла кънѧгыни а ныне сѧ дроужина по мѧ пороучила а ныне ка посъли къ томоу моужеви грамотоу е ли
оу него роба а се ти хочоу коне коупивъ и кънѧжъ моужъ въсадивъ та на съводы а ты атче еси не възалъ коунъ
техъ а не емли ничъто же оу него

Transliteration:

gramota otŭ žiznomira kŭ mikule
kupilŭ esi robu plŭskove a nyne mę
vŭ tomŭ ęla kŭnęgyni a nyne sę družina po mę poručila a nyne ka posŭli kŭ tomu muževi gramotu e li
u nego roba a se ti xoču kone kupivŭ i kŭnęžŭ mužŭ vŭsadivŭ ta na sŭvody a ty atče esi ne vŭzalŭ kunŭ
texŭ a ne emli ničŭto že u nego

Translation (with added explanations not present in the original text in brackets):

Letter from Zhiznomir to Mikula: You have bought a female slave in Pskov. And now the princess has arrested me for it. (Obviously she has recognized the slave as having been stolen from her, and Zhiznomir is somehow connected with the affair, maybe as Mikula's family member or business partner.) But now druzhina has guaranteed for me. And now send a letter to that man (whom you have bought the slave from) and ask him whether he has another female slave. (This other slave would have to be given to the princess for the time the stolen slave would be needed as "corpus delicti" in a lawsuit to find out who the thief was.) And I want to buy a horse and have the magistrate (the "prince's man") sit on it and initiate a svod (the legal procedure to trace a whole buying chain back to the original seller and ultimately the thief). And if you have not taken the money, do not take anything from him (i.e. the slave-trader, because otherwise the whole plan might leak out).

=== An invitation: Novgorod birch-bark letter no. 497 ===
Dated between the 1340s and 1380s; excavated 1972.

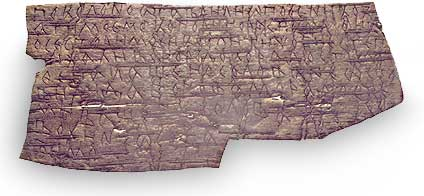
Birch-bark letter no. 497, c. 1340-90, Novgorod; photograph

Original text (with added word division):

поколоно ѿ гаврили ѿ посени ко зати моемоу ко горигори жи коумоу ко сестори моеи ко оулите чо би есте поихали во городо ко радости моеи а нашего солова не ѡставили да бого вамо радосте ми вашего солова вохи не ѡсотавимо

Transliteration:

pokolono ot gavrili ot poseni ko zati mojemu ko gorigori ži kumu ko sestori mojei ko ulite čo bi este poixali vo gorodo ko radosti mojei a našego solova ne ostavili da bogo vamo radoste mi vašego solova voxi ne osotavimo

Translation:

Greeting from Gavrila Posenya to my brother-in-law, godfather Grigory, and my sister Ulita. Would you not like to give me the pleasure of riding into the city, not leaving our word? God give you happiness. We all do not leave your word.

== See also ==
- North Slavic languages
- Novgorod Codex
- Old Pskov dialect
- Onfim

== Sources ==
- Dekker, Simeon (2018). Old Russian Birchbark Letters: A Pragmatic Approach. Brill. ISBN 978-90-04-36238-3.
- Greenberg, Marc L. (20 January 2017). "Slavic". In Kapović, Mate (ed.). The Indo-European Languages. Taylor & Francis. pp. 519–551. ISBN 978-1-317-39153-1.
- Savignac, David (1974). A History of the Pronominal Declension in the Novgorod Dialect of Old Russian from the 11th to the 16th Centuries.
- Savignac, David (1975). Common Slavic *vьx- in Northern Old Russian.
- Schaeken, Jos (5 November 2018). Voices on Birchbark: Everyday Communication in Medieval Russia. BRILL. ISBN 978-90-04-38942-7.
- Schallert, Joseph (2024). "Dialectal Fragmentation". In Šipka, Danko (ed.). The Cambridge Handbook of Slavic Linguistics. Cambridge University Press. pp. 595–625. ISBN 978-1-108-83267-0.
- Vermeer, Willem (1994). "On Explaining Why the Early North Russian Nominative Singular in -e Does Not Palatalize Stem-Final Velars". Russian Linguistics. 18 (2): 145–157. ISSN 0304-3487.
- Vinokur, Grigory O. (2 April 1971). The Russian Language: A Brief History. Cambridge University Press. ISBN 978-0-521-07944-0.
- Yanin, Valentin Lavrentyevich. Ja poslal tebe berestu... ("I've Sent a Birch Bark to You...") 3rd ed., with an afterword by A.A. Zaliznyak. Moscow 1998.
- Zaliznyak, Andrey Anatolyevich (1995), Древненовгородский диалект [Old Novgorodian dialect] (in Russian), Moscow: Языки славянской культуры, ISBN 5-94457-165-9
- Zaliznyak, Andrey Anatolyevich (2004), Древненовгородский диалект [Old Novgorodian dialect] (in Russian), Moscow: Языки славянской культуры, ISBN 5-94457-165-9
- Zaliznyak, Andrey A.; Sheveleva, M. N. (2017). "Древненовгородский диалект". Языки мира: Славянские языки [Languages of the world: the Slavic languages] (2nd ed.). Saint Petersburg: Nestor. pp. 476–540. ISBN 978-5-4469-0830-1.
