= East Slavic languages =

Language family

East Slavic
- Geographic distribution: Eurasia (Eastern Europe, Northern Asia, and the Caucasus)
- Ethnicity: East Slavs
- Linguistic classification: Indo-European: Balto-Slavic; Slavic; East Slavic
- Early forms: Proto-Indo-European: Proto-Balto-Slavic; Proto-Slavic; Old East Slavic
- Subdivisions: Belarusian; Russian; Rusyn; Ukrainian; Podlachian; West Polesian

Language codes
- ISO 639-5: zle
- Glottolog: east1426

The East Slavic languages constitute one of three regional subgroups of the Slavic languages, distinct from the West and South Slavic languages. East Slavic languages are currently spoken natively throughout Eastern Europe, and eastwards to Siberia and the Russian Far East. In part due to the large historical influence of the Russian Empire and the Soviet Union, the Russian language is also spoken as a lingua franca in many regions of the Caucasus and Central Asia. Of the three Slavic branches, East Slavic is the most spoken, with the number of native speakers larger than the Western and Southern branches combined.

The common consensus is that Belarusian, Russian and Ukrainian are the extant East Slavic languages. Some linguists also consider Rusyn a separate language, although it is sometimes considered a dialect of Ukrainian.

The modern East Slavic languages descend from a common predecessor spoken in Kievan Rus' from the 9th to 13th centuries, which later evolved into Ruthenian, the chancery language of the Grand Duchy of Lithuania in the Dnieper river valley, and into medieval Russian in the Volga river valley, the language of the Russian principalities including the Grand Duchy of Moscow.

All these languages use the Cyrillic script, but with particular modifications. Belarusian and Ukrainian, which are descendants of Ruthenian, have a tradition of using Latin-based alphabets — the Belarusian Lacinka and the Ukrainian Latynka alphabets, respectively (also Rusyn uses Latin in some regions, e.g. in Slovakia).

== Distribution ==
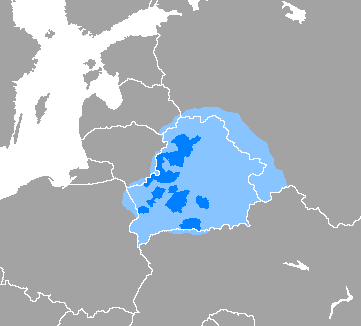
Distribution of the Belarusian language in Europe

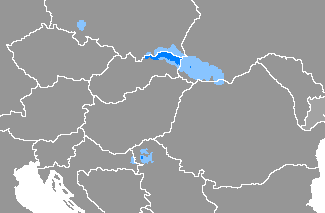
Distribution of the Rusyn language in Europe

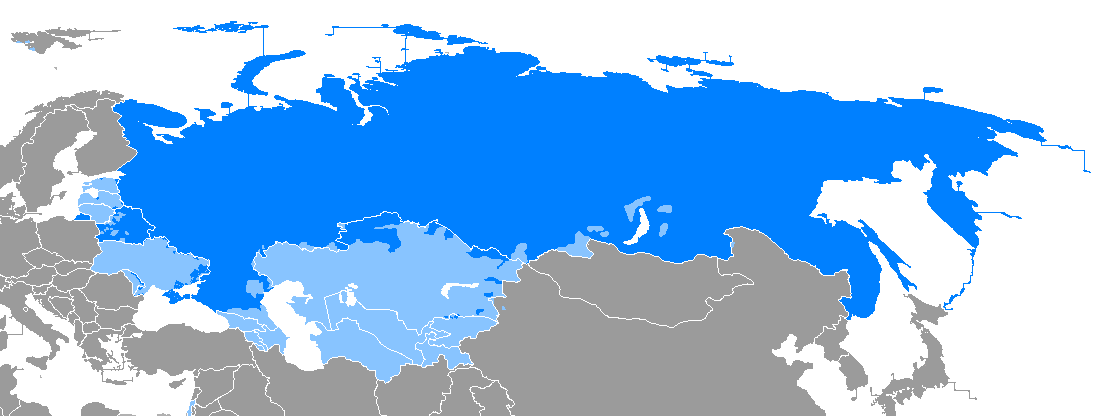
Distribution of the Russian language in Eurasia

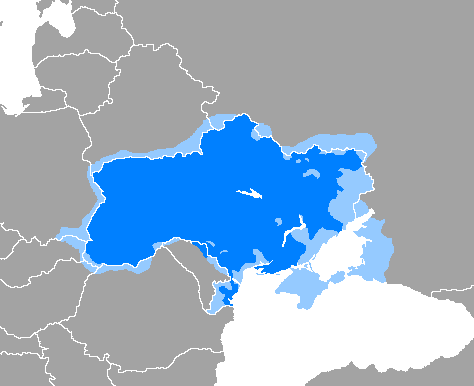
Distribution of the Ukrainian language in Europe

== Classification ==
Modern East Slavic languages include Belarusian, Russian and Ukrainian. The Rusyn language is sometimes considered the fourth living language of the group, its status as an independent language being the subject of scientific debate.

== Distinctive features ==
=== Vocabulary ===
The East Slavic territory exhibits a linguistic continuum with many transitional dialects. Between Belarusian and Ukrainian there is the Polesian dialect, which shares features from both languages. East Polesian is a transitional variety between Belarusian and Ukrainian on one hand, and between South Russian and Ukrainian on the other hand. At the same time, Belarusian and Southern Russian form a continuous area, making it virtually impossible to draw a line between the two languages. Central or Middle Russian (with its Moscow sub-dialect), the transitional step between the North and the South, became a base for the Russian literary standard. Northern Russian with its predecessor, the Old Novgorod dialect, has many original and archaic features.

Ruthenian, the ancestor of modern Belarusian and Ukrainian, was the official language of the Grand Duchy of Lithuania as "Chancery Slavonic" until the end of the 17th century when it was gradually replaced by the Polish language. It was also the native language of the Cossack Hetmanate until the end of the 18th century, when the Ukrainian state completely became part of the Russian Empire in 1764. The Constitution of Pylyp Orlyk from 1710 is one of the most important written sources of the Ruthenian language. Due to the influence of the Polish–Lithuanian Commonwealth over many centuries, Belarusian and Ukrainian have been influenced in several respects by Polish, a Lechitic West Slavic language. As a result of the long Polish-Lithuanian rule, these languages had been less exposed to Church Slavonic, featuring therefore less Church Slavonicisms than the modern Russian language, for example:

Comparison of the word "sweet"
Ukrainian	Belarusian	Russian	Rusyn
солодкий (solodkyj)	салодкі (salodki)	сладкий (sladkij)	солодкый (solodkyj)

Additionally, the original East Slavic phonetic form was kept in many words in Ukrainian and Belarusian, for example:

Comparison of the word "unit"
Ukrainian	Belarusian	Russian	Rusyn
одиниця (odynycia)	адзінка (adzinka)	eдиница (yedinica)	єдиниця (yedynycia)

In general, Ukrainian and Belarusian are also closer to other Western European languages, especially to German (via Polish). At the same time Russian was being heavily influenced by Church Slavonic (South Slavic language), but also by the Turkic and Uralic languages. For example:

Comparison of the word "to search"
Ukrainian	Belarusian	Russian	Rusyn
шукати (šukaty)	шукаць (šukać)	искать (iskat́)	глядати (hliadaty)
Compare Polish "szukać" and Old Low German "sōkian" (German "suchen")		Compare Bulgarian "искам" (iskam) (with a meaning shift: "to want") and Serbo-Croatian "искати" (iskati)	Compare Slovak "hľadať" and Czech "hledat"

What's more, all three languages do also have false friends, that sometimes can lead to (big) misunderstandings. For example, Ukrainian орати (oraty) — "to plow" and Russian орать (orat́) — "to scream", or Ukrainian помітити (pomityty) — "to notice" and Russian пометить (pometit́) — "to mark".

=== Orthography ===
==== Alphabet ====
The alphabets of the East Slavic languages are all written in the Cyrillic script, however each of them has their own letters and pronunciations. Russian and Ukrainian have 33 letters, while Belarusian has 32. Additionally, Belarusian and Ukrainian use the apostrophe (') for the hard sign, which has the same function as the letter Ъ in Russian.

Cyrillic alphabets comparison table
East Slavic languages
Russian	А	Б	В	Г		Д	Е		Ё	Ж	З	И			Й	К	Л	М	Н	О	П	Р	С	Т	У		Ф	Х	Ц	Ч	Ш	Щ	Ъ	Ы	Ь	Э	Ю	Я
Belarusian	А	Б	В	Г		Д	Е		Ё	Ж	З		І		Й	К	Л	М	Н	О	П	Р	С	Т	У	Ў	Ф	Х	Ц	Ч	Ш		'	Ы	Ь	Э	Ю	Я
Ukrainian	А	Б	В	Г	Ґ	Д	Е	Є		Ж	З	И	І	Ї	Й	К	Л	М	Н	О	П	Р	С	Т	У		Ф	Х	Ц	Ч	Ш	Щ	'		Ь		Ю	Я
Rusyn	А	Б	В	Г	Ґ	Д	Е	Є	Ё	Ж	З	И	І	Ї	Й	К	Л	М	Н	О	П	Р	С	Т	У		Ф	Х	Ц	Ч	Ш	Щ	Ъ	Ы	Ь		Ю	Я

Some letters, that are not included in the alphabet of a language, can be written as digraphs. For example, the sound values of the letter Ё, which doesn't exist in the Ukrainian alphabet, can be written as ЙО (ЬО after consonants), while the letter Щ in Russian and Ukrainian corresponds to ШЧ in Belarusian (compare Belarusian плошча and Ukrainian площа ("area")).

There are also different rules of usage for certain letters, e.g. the soft sign (Ь) cannot be written after the letter Ц in Russian, because the consonant /tsʲ/ does not exist in the Russian language, while in Ukrainian and especially Belarusian, on the contrary, it is relatively common (Ukrainian ць etymologically corresponds to Russian and Belarusian ц; Belarusian ць etymologically corresponds to Russian and Ukrainian ть). Moreover, the letter Щ in standard Russian is always pronounced softly (palatalization).

Standard Ukrainian, unlike all the other Slavic languages (excl. Serbo-Croatian), does not exhibit final devoicing. Nevertheless, this rule is not that clear when listening to colloquial Ukrainian. It's one of the typical deviations that occur in the Ukrainian spoken language.

==== Different sound values of letters ====
Besides the differences of the alphabets, some letters represent different sounds depending on the language. For example, the letter И (romanized as I for Russian and Y for Ukrainian) in Russian is mostly pronounced as /i/ (identical with the Ukrainian І), while in Ukrainian it's mostly pronounced as /ɪ/ (very similar to the Russian Ы). Other examples:

"False friends"
Letter		Pronunciation
Belarusian and Russian Е	Ukrainian Є	/je/, /ʲe/
Belarusian and Russian Э	Ukrainian Е	/e/
Belarusian and Russian Ы	Ukrainian И	/ɨ/ (B. and R.), /ɪ/ (U.)
Belarusian and Ukrainian І	Russian И	/i/, /ʲi/
Belarusian and Ukrainian Г	sometimes Russian Г	/ɣ/, /ɦ/
Russian Г	Ukrainian Ґ	/ɡ/

==== Representation of vowel reduction ====
Vowel reduction occurs in standard Russian and Belarusian, but the Russian orthography does not reflect it, whereas the Belarusian orthography does. For example: Russian кот [kot] "cat", коты́ [kɐˈtɨ] "cats"; Belarusian кот [kot] "cat", каты́ [kaˈtɨ] "cats".

=== Phonology ===
Isoglosses	Northern Russian	Standard Russian (Moscow dialect)	Southern Russian	Standard Belarusian	Standard Ukrainian	Examples
reduction of unstressed /o/ (akanye)	no	yes (Note: Except for the Polesian dialect of Brest)			no (Note: Except for the Eastern Polesian dialect)	R. голова́ /ɡɐlɐˈva/, B. галава́ /ɣalaˈva/, U. голова́ /ɦɔlɔˈʋa/ "head"
pretonic /ʲe/ (yakanye)	/ʲe/	/ʲi/	/ʲa/		/e/ (Note: Consonants are hard before /e/)	R. земля́ /zʲiˈmlʲa/, B. зямля́ /zʲaˈmlʲa/, U. земля́ /zeˈmlʲa/ "earth"
Proto-Slavic *i	/i/				/ɪ/ (Note: Except for some dialects)	R. лист /ˈlʲist/, B. ліст /ˈlʲist/, U. лист /ˈlɪst/ "leaf"
Proto-Slavic *y	/ɨ/				/ɪ/	R./B. ты /ˈtɨ/, U. ти /ˈtɪ/ "thou, you"
stressed CoC	/o/				/i/ (Note: In some Ukrainian dialects C/o/C can be /y~y̯e~y̯i~u̯o/) (Note: In some Ukrainian dialects PSl *ě can be /e̝~i̯ɛ/)	R. ночь /ˈnot͡ɕ/, B. ноч /ˈnot͡ʂ/, U. ніч /ˈnʲit͡ʃ/ "night"
Proto-Slavic *ě	/e̝~i̯ɛ~i/	/e/			/i/	R. се́мя /ˈsʲemʲa/, B. се́мя /ˈsʲemʲa/, U. сі́м'я /ˈsʲimja/ "seed"
/e/>/o/ change before nonpalatalized consonants (Note: Also at the end of words (in Russian and Belarusian). In Belarusian (unlike Russian), the change is not present in stressed 2 and 3 sg. pres. ind. endings.)	always	under stress			after /j/, /nʲ/, /lʲ/, /ʒ/, /ʃ/, /t͡ʃ/	R. зелёный /zʲiˈlʲonɨj/, B. зялёны /zʲaˈlʲonɨ/, U. зеле́ний /zeˈlenɪj/ "green"
Proto-Slavic *c	/t͡s/ (Note: Can be /s/ in South Russian) (Note: In some Northern Russian dialects, Proto-Slavic *c and *č have merged into one sound, variously pronounced as /t͡s, t͡sʲ, t͡ʂ, t͡ɕ/ depending on a dialect.)				/t͡s, t͡sʲ/	R. волчица (volčica), B. ваўчыца (vaŭčyca), U. вовчиця (vovčyc’a) "female wolf"
Proto-Slavic *č	/t͡ɕ/ (Note: Can be /ɕ/ in Southern Russian)			/t͡ʂ/	/t͡ʃ/	R. час /ˈt͡ɕas/ "hour", B. час /ˈt͡ʂas/, U. час /ˈt͡ʃas/ "time"
Proto-Slavic *skj, zgj	/ɕː/, (Note: Can be /ɕt͡ɕ/, /ʂː/) /ʑː/			/ʂt͡ʂ/, /ʐd͡ʐ/	/ʃt͡ʃ/, /ʒd͡ʒ/	R. ещё /jeˈɕːo/ B. яшчэ /jaˈʂt͡ʂe/, U. ще /ʃt͡ʃe/ "yet"
soft dental stops	/tʲ/, /dʲ/ (Note: In Russian light affrication can occur: [tˢʲ] , [dᶻʲ])			/t͡sʲ/, /d͡zʲ/	/tʲ/, /dʲ/	R. де́сять /ˈdʲesʲitʲ/, B. дзе́сяць /ˈd͡zʲesʲat͡sʲ/, U. де́сять /ˈdesʲatʲ/ "ten"
Proto-Slavic *v	/v, f/ (Note: In some Northern Russian sub-dialects /v/ is not devoiced to /f/)		/w/	/v/ [v, w]	/ʋ/ [β, w] /u̯/ (at the end of a closed syllable)	R. о́стров /ˈostraf/, B. во́страў /ˈvostrau̯/, U. о́стрів /ˈostriu̯/ "island"
/f/ (in loanwords)	/f/		/x~xv~xw~xu̯/	/f/		
Prothetic /v~w~u̯/	no (Note: Except for восемь "eight" and some others)		yes			R. о́стров /ˈostraf/, B. во́страў /ˈvostrau̯/, U. о́стрів /ˈostriu̯/ "island"
Proto-Slavic *g	/ɡ/		/ɣ/		/ɦ/	R. голова́ /ɡɐlɐˈva/, B. галава́ /ɣalaˈva/, U. голова́ /ɦɔlɔˈʋa/ "head"
Hardening of final soft labials	no		yes			R. степь /sʲtʲepʲ/, B. стэп /stɛp/, U. степ /stɛp/ "steppe"
Hardening of soft /rʲ/	no			yes	hardened at the end of a closed syllable and not hardened elsewere	R. матерь (máter') B. Вікторыя (Viktoryja), U. кобзар (kobzár (nominative case), кобзаря (kobzarjá (genitive case)
Proto-Slavic *CrьC, ClьC, CrъC, ClъC	/rʲe/, /lʲe/, /ro/, /lo/			/rɨ/, /lʲi/, /rɨ/, /lɨ/	/rɪ/, /lɪ/, /ro/, /lo/	Proto-Slavic *kry (accusative singular *krъvь): R. кровь (krov'), кровавый (krovávyj); B. кроў (kroŭ), крывавы (kryvávy); U. кров (krov), кривавий (kryvávyj) "blood, bloody"
Proto-Slavic *-ъj-, -ьj-	/oj/, /ej/			/ɨj/, /ij/	/ɪj/	
Proto-Slavic adj. end. *-ьjь	/ej/	/ij/, (Note: Only unstressed, Church Slavonic influence) /ej/	/ej/ (Note: Stressed, unstressed is usually reduced to [ʲəj])	/ij/	/ɪj/, /ij/	
Proto-Slavic adj. end. *-ъjь	/oj/	/ɨj/, /oj/	/oj/ (Note: Stressed, unstressed is usually reduced to [əj])	/ɨj/	/ɪj/	
Loss of the vocative case	no	yes (Note: In colloquial Russian, a new vocative has appeared from a pure stem: мам, пап, Маш, Вань etc.)			no	
3 sg. & pl. pres. ind.	/t/		/tʲ/	/t͡sʲ/	/tʲ/	R. ду́мают /ˈdumajut/, B. ду́маюць /ˈdumajut͡sʲ/, Uk. ду́мають /ˈdumajutʲ/ "(they) think"
Dropping out of 3 sg. pres. ind. ending (in e-stems)	no		yes			R. скажет (skážet) B. скажа (skáža), U. скаже (skáže) "(he/she) will say"
3 sg. masc. past ind.	/v~w~u̯/ (Note: In the dialect of Vologda)	/l/		/u̯/		R. ду́мал /ˈdumal/, B. ду́маў /ˈdumau̯/, U. ду́мав /ˈdumau̯/ "(he) thought"
2nd palatalization in oblique cases	no			yes		R. руке́ /ruˈkʲe/, B. руцэ́ /ruˈt͡se/, U. руці́ /ruˈt͡sʲi/ "hand" (locative or prepositional case)

== History ==
=== Influence of Church Slavonic ===
After the conversion of the East Slavic region to Christianity the people used service books borrowed from Bulgaria, which were written in Old Church Slavonic (a South Slavic language). The Church Slavonic language was strictly used only in text, while the colloquial language of the Bulgarians was communicated in its spoken form.

Throughout the Middle Ages (and in some way up to the present day) there existed a duality between the Church Slavonic language used as some kind of 'higher' register (not only) in religious texts and the popular tongue used as a 'lower' register for secular texts. It has been suggested to describe this situation as diglossia, although there do exist mixed texts where it is sometimes very hard to determine why a given author used a popular or a Church Slavonic form in a given context. Church Slavonic was a major factor in the evolution of modern Russian, where there still exists a "high stratum" of words that were imported from this language.

== See also ==
- Outline of Slavic history and culture

== Sources ==
- Moser, Michael A. (2016). "Rusyn: A New-Old Language In-between Nations and States". The Palgrave Handbook of Slavic Languages, Identities and Borders. London: Palgrave Macmillan. pp. 124–139. doi:10.1007/978-1-137-34839-5_7. ISBN 978-1-349-57703-3. Archived from the original on 14 January 2020.
- Pugh, Stefan M. (2009). The Rusyn Language. Munich, Germany: LINCOM GmbH. ISBN 978-3-89586-940-2. Archived from the original on 15 December 2021.
- Sussex, Roland; Cubberley, Paul (2006). The Slavic languages. Cambridge: Cambridge University Press. ISBN 978-0-521-22315-7.
