= Doukhobors at Veregin =

National Historic Site of Canada in Saskatchewan

- Interactive map of Doukhobors at Veregin
- Location: Veregin, Country
- Coordinates: 51.5817°N 102.0841°W
- Established: 1904

Doukhobors at Veregin is a National Historic Site of Canada located in the village of Veregin, Saskatchewan, and designated so in 2006. The site is also known as National Doukhobor Heritage Village.

The site includes four historical buildings associated with Veregin's role in its heyday as the administrative and spiritual centre of the Canadian Doukhobors in the early 20th century.

== The buildings ==
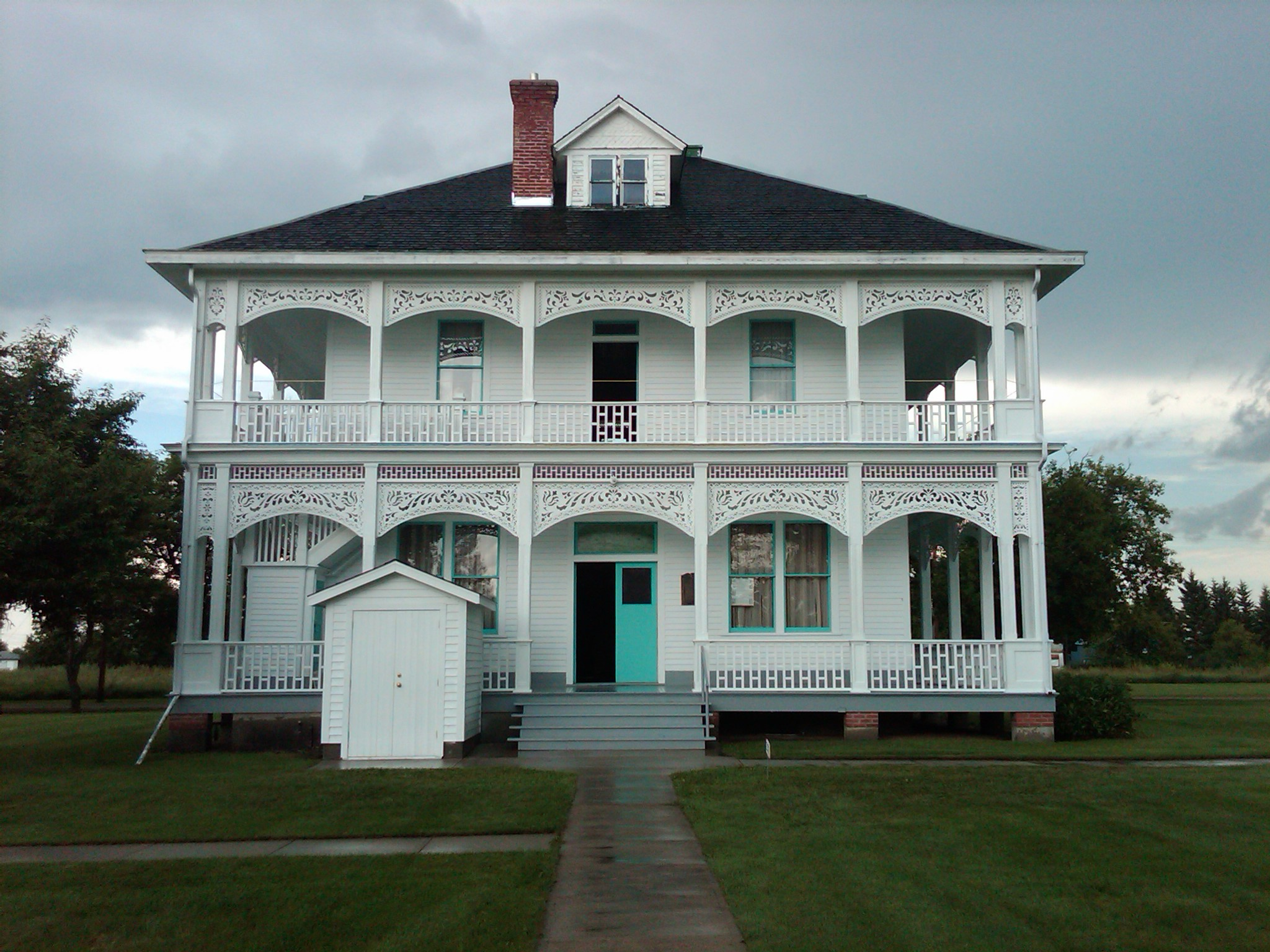
The prayer house in Veregin, commonly called "The Dome".

The main building of the site is the prayer house, constructed in 1917 as the spiritual meeting place of the community and personal residence of the leader of the majority of the Doukhobors, Peter Vasilevich Verigin. It is an intricately decorated two-storey building, inspired by the architectural traditions brought by the Doukhobor settlers from Russia. The building is surrounded by a large open space that was used for community outdoor meetings.

The other several other buildings located on the grounds are - A Doukhobor house, Tolstoy and Prayer Home, bakery, banya (bath house), granary, barn, and blacksmith. There is also a statue of Leo Tolstoy and a millstone.

The Museum and Registration Building showcases many artifacts including Peter V. Verigin's own "Rockaway" Coach.

== Events ==
The headquarters of the organization of Community Doukhobors, Peter Verigin's Christian Community of Universal Brotherhood (CCUB), was located in Veregin from the organization's incorporation in 1917 until its move to Brilliant (near Castlegar, British Columbia).

Doukhobors at Veregin Statue of Leo Tolstoy

Even though the majority of the Doukhobors moved from Saskatchewan to British Columbia even earlier, the Saskatchewan years loom large in their history. This is why Veregin was chosen by Doukhobor organizations as the site to celebrate the 60th, 75th and 100th anniversaries of their arrival to Canada in 1899.

== Sources ==
- LIEU HISTORIQUE NATIONAL DU CANADA DES DOUKHOBORS-À-VEREGIN (in French)
- New Designation Recognizes the National Historic Significance of the Doukhobors at Veregin, Saskatchewan (Doukhobor Genealogy Website)
- Directory of Designations of National Historic Significance of Canada. "Doukhobors at Veregin" National Historic Site of Canada
