= Doukhobor Russian =

Variety of Russian

- Диалект духоборов Канады; Dialekt Duchoborov Kanady
- Native to: Canada
- Region: British Columbia, Saskatchewan, Alberta
- Ethnicity: Doukhobors
- Native speakers: 200 (2019)
- Language family: Indo-European: Balto-Slavic; Slavic; East Slavic; Russian; Southern; Doukhobor Russian
- Writing system: Cyrillic

Language codes
- ISO 639-3: –
- Glottolog: douk1234
- IETF: ru-CA

Doukhobor Russian, also called Doukhobor dialect and Doukhoborese ("D'ese" in short), is a dialect of the Russian language spoken by Canadian Doukhobors, spiritual Christians from Russia, one-third of whom (about 8,300) were the largest mass migration to Canada (1899-1930). They spoke Southern Russian dialects, which slowly changed under the influence of Canadian English and neighboring Ukrainian Canadians settlers in Saskatchewan. At its peak, there were as many as 30,000 speakers, but now, there are only a few hundred.

Over several generations, their original dialect has been mostly lost, as descendants are educated and immersed with Canadians, and when they do speak Russian, it is more modern Standard Russian with a Canadian accent.

== History ==
It is reasonable to assume that the formative period for the speech of the Doukhobors was the first four decades of the 19th century. It was in 1802 that many heterodox groups, self-labeled as spiritual Christians including Doukhobors, were encouraged to migrate to the Molochna River region, around Melitopol near Ukraine's Sea of Azov coast, where they could be controlled, isolated from contaminating Orthodox Russians with their heresies, and converted to Orthodoxy. Over the next 10–20 years, thousands arrived, most speaking a Southern Russian dialect. Now concentrated, they were exposed to a variety of somewhat similar people who could learn the other's dialect koiné, based on Southern Russian and Eastern Ukrainian dialects.

Starting in 1839, Spiritual Christians tribes were enticed to resettle to Transcaucasia to further isolate them from Orthodox, and to establish a Russian presence in the conquered non-Russian-speaking territory. The invading villages from Russia were surrounded by mostly indigenous non-Russian-speaking peoples. Here, in relative isolation from the rest of the Empire, their dialects and singing distinctly evolved.

With the migration of some 7,500 Doukhbors from Transcaucasia to Saskatchewan in 1899, and some smaller latecomer groups (both from Transcaucasia and from places of exile in Siberia and elsewhere), the dialect spoken in the Doukhobor villages of Transcaucasia was brought to the plains of Canada. From that point on it experienced influence from the English language of Canada and, during the years of Doukhobor stay in Saskatchewan, the speech of Doukhobor's Ukrainian neighbors.

A split in the Doukhobor community resulted in a large number of Doukhobors moving from Saskatchewan to south-eastern British Columbia around 1910. Those who moved (the so-called "Community Doukhobors" – followers of Peter Verigin's Christian Community of Universal Brotherhood – continued living a communal lifestyle for several more decades, and preserved their Russian language more the "Independent Doukhobors", who assimilated by staying in Saskatchewan, most as individual farmers.

By the 1970s, most Russia-born died along with their language Their English speech is not noticeably different from that of other English-speaking Canadians of their provinces. Russian is used primarily during religious meetings and psalm singing. Practising Doukhobors are declining, about 3,800 counted in the Canada 2001 Census.

It was reported that only a few hundred elderly speakers of Doukhobor Russian remained by 2019.

== Features ==
According to Gunter Schaarschmidt's survey article ("Four norms ..."), research into the Russian spoken by Canada's Doukhobors has not been extensive. However, a number of articles, mostly published in the 1960s and 1970s, noted a variety of features in Doukhobors' Russian speech that were indeed characteristic of Southern, and in some cases Central Russian dialects, e.g. use of the Southern, [h] where Standard Russian has [g].

Features characteristic of a number of locales in the East Slavic language space were noted as well, reflecting perhaps the heterogeneous origin of the Doukhobors' settlements in Molochna River after 1800; e.g., similarly to Belarusians, Doukhobor speakers do not palatalize [r] in "редко" (redko, 'seldom'). Remarkable was the dropping of the final -t in the 3rd person singular form of verbs. This can be considered a Ukrainian feature, and it is also attested in some Russian dialects spoken in Southern Ukraine (e.g., Nikolaev, not too far from the Doukhobors' old homeland on the Molochna).

As with other immigrant groups, the Russian speech of the Doukhobors uses English loanwords for some concepts that they had not encountered until moving to Canada.

== Spelling of Doukhobor surnames in English ==
Canadian Independent Doukhobor historian and genealogist Jonathan J. Kalmakoff compiled extensive lists and guides for Russian names variously transcibed into Canadian English. The following is a sample:

- Chernenkoff
- Denisoff
- Kalesnikoff
- Malakoff
- Poznikoff
- Saprikin

== Main source ==
- Makarova V. 2012. The use of Russian in contemporary Doukhobor prayer service. In: International scientific research Internet conference "Current issues in philology and methods of teaching foreign languages"., 1–29 February 2012, Novosibirsk, Russia. Международнaя научно-практическая Интернет-конференция «Актуальные проблемы филологии и методики преподавания иностранных языков», 1 февраля - 29 февраля 2012 года; http://ffl.nspu.net/?p=144
- Makarova V. A., Usenkova, E.V., Evdokimova, V.V. Evgrafova, K. V. 2011. The Language of Saskatchewan Doukhobors: Introduction to analysis. Izvestija Vysshix uchebnyx zavedenij [The News of Higher Schools]. Serija Gumanitarnyje nauki [Humanities]. Razdel Lingvistika [Linguistics section]. Vol 2 (2), pp 146–151. http://www.isuct.ru/e-publ/gum/ru/2011/t02n02/philology-and-linguistics
- Schaarschmidt Gunter(University of Victoria, Canada) Four norms – one culture: Doukhobor Russian in Canada
- Schaarschmidt, G. 2012. Russian language history in Canada. Doukhobor internal and external migrations: effects on language development and structure. In: V. Makarova (Ed), Russian Language Studies in North America: the New Perspectives from Theoretical and Applied Linguistics. London/New York: Anthem Press.pp 235–260. www.anthempress.com

== Additional references ==
- Doukhobor Historical Maps by Jonathan J. Kalmakoff (Doukhobor Heritage website)
- Doukhobor Russian Paintings – Original artwork depicting their culture, heritage, and spirit
