= Slavyanka, Azerbaijan =

Slavyanka
- Municipality
- Location within Azerbaijan
- Coordinates: 40°39′27″N 45°48′38″E
- Country: Azerbaijan
- Rayon: Gadabay

Population
  - Total: 3,705
- Time zone: UTC+4 (AZT)
  - Summer (DST): UTC+5 (AZT)

Slavyanka (Russian: Славянка) is a village and the second most populous municipality after the capital Gədəbəy in the Gadabay Rayon of Azerbaijan. It has a population of 3,705. The municipality consists of the villages of Slavyanka and Maarif.

== History ==
Along with a number of other villages in northwestern Azerbaijan, Slavyanka was settled in 1844 by the Doukhobors, members of a Pacifist dissenter Christian group resettled to Transcaucasia by Nicholas I from the Molochna River settlements in today's Zaporizhzhia Oblast of Ukraine. The village is said to have been named after the town of Slavyansk (in today's Donetsk Oblast), where many of the ancestors of the Molochna Doukhobors had originated.

Slavyanka was the birthplace of the Doukhobor leader Peter Verigin, who was born there on June 29, 1859.

The Russian painter Vasily Vereshchagin visited Slavyanka in 1863. The village at the time had 205 houses with around 600 male residents (and, presumably, a similar number of females). According to Vereshchagin, the Doukhobors "lived an honest, reasonable, and prosperous life", but, under the pressure of the struggle for existence in the borderlands, had become less strict in their practices, many taking up smoking tobacco and drinking alcohol.

During the confrontation with the Czarist government in the mid-1890s over the conscription and oath of allegiance, in June 1895 Slavyanka became the site of the area's Doukhobors destroying their weapons in the well-known "Burning of the Arms" event. The government responded by exiling a large number of the local Doukhobors elsewhere in Russian Empire; some died of starvation, exposure, and diseases in the process. In 1899, many survivors left for Saskatchewan, Canada.

Many of the Doukhobors that remained in Elisabethpol Governorate (today's western Azerbaijan) joined other dissenting Christian groups, such as Molokans or Baptists. Others moved in the 1920s to Ukraine or Russia, where they named villages in Zaporizhzhia Oblast and Rostov Oblast after their old home in Azerbaijan.

During the Soviet period, the peasants of the village were collectivized into a kolkhoz named Put' Ilyicha (Russian: Путь Ильича, 'Lenin's Way').

== Slavyanka's name carried to Canada ==
The Doukhobors who emigrated to Canada named two of their new short-lived villages after the Caucasian Slavyanka. One Slavyanka was located near Blaine Lake, Saskatchewan in the so-called "Saskatchewan Doukhobor Colony"; it was founded in 1901 and abandoned in 1911. The other, north of Veregin, Saskatchewan in the so-called "South Doukhobor Colony", was established in 1899; in 1905, its residents mostly moved to two other villages, and this Slavyanka was soon abandoned.

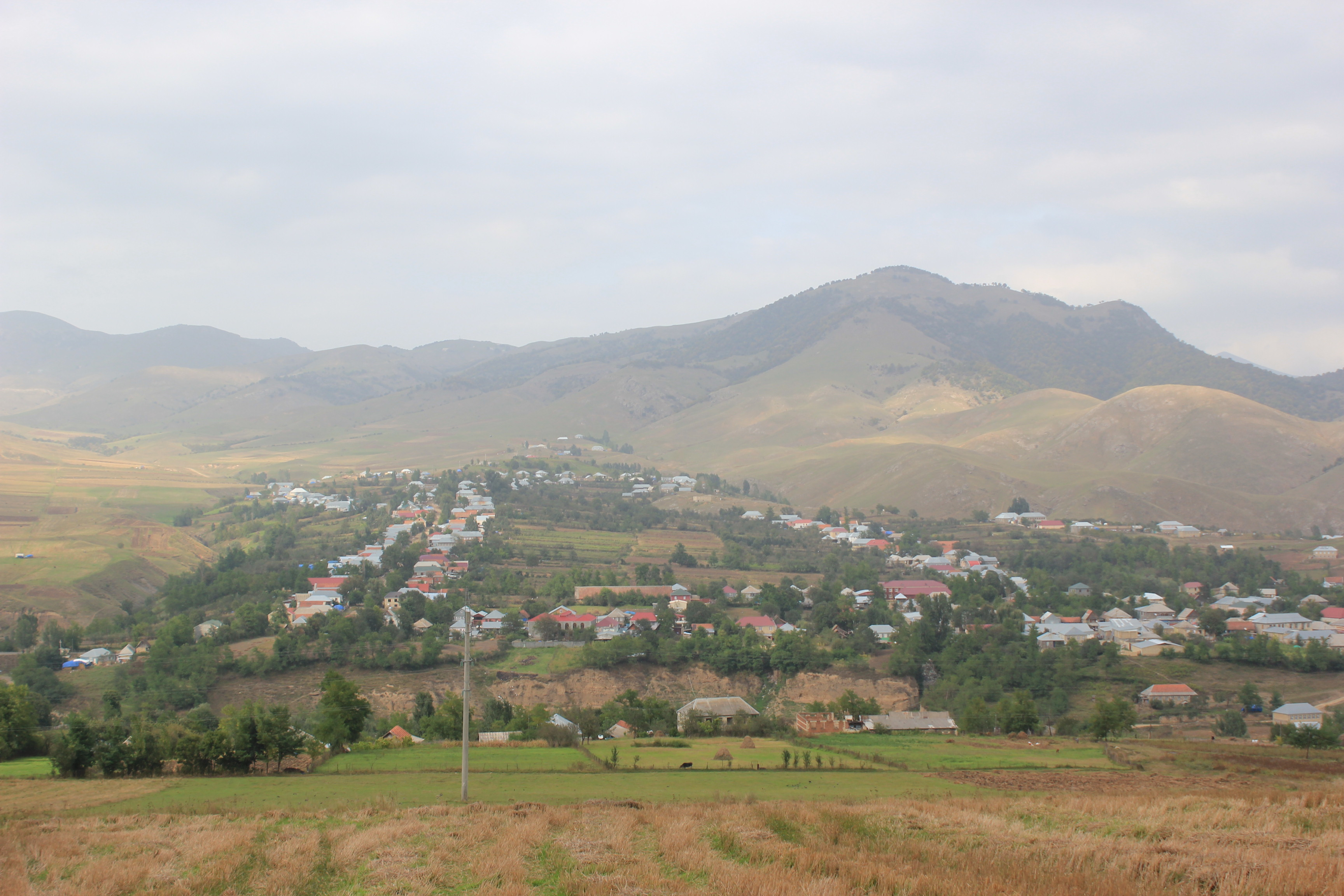
Doukhobor's village Slavyanka Credit: Asif Masimov

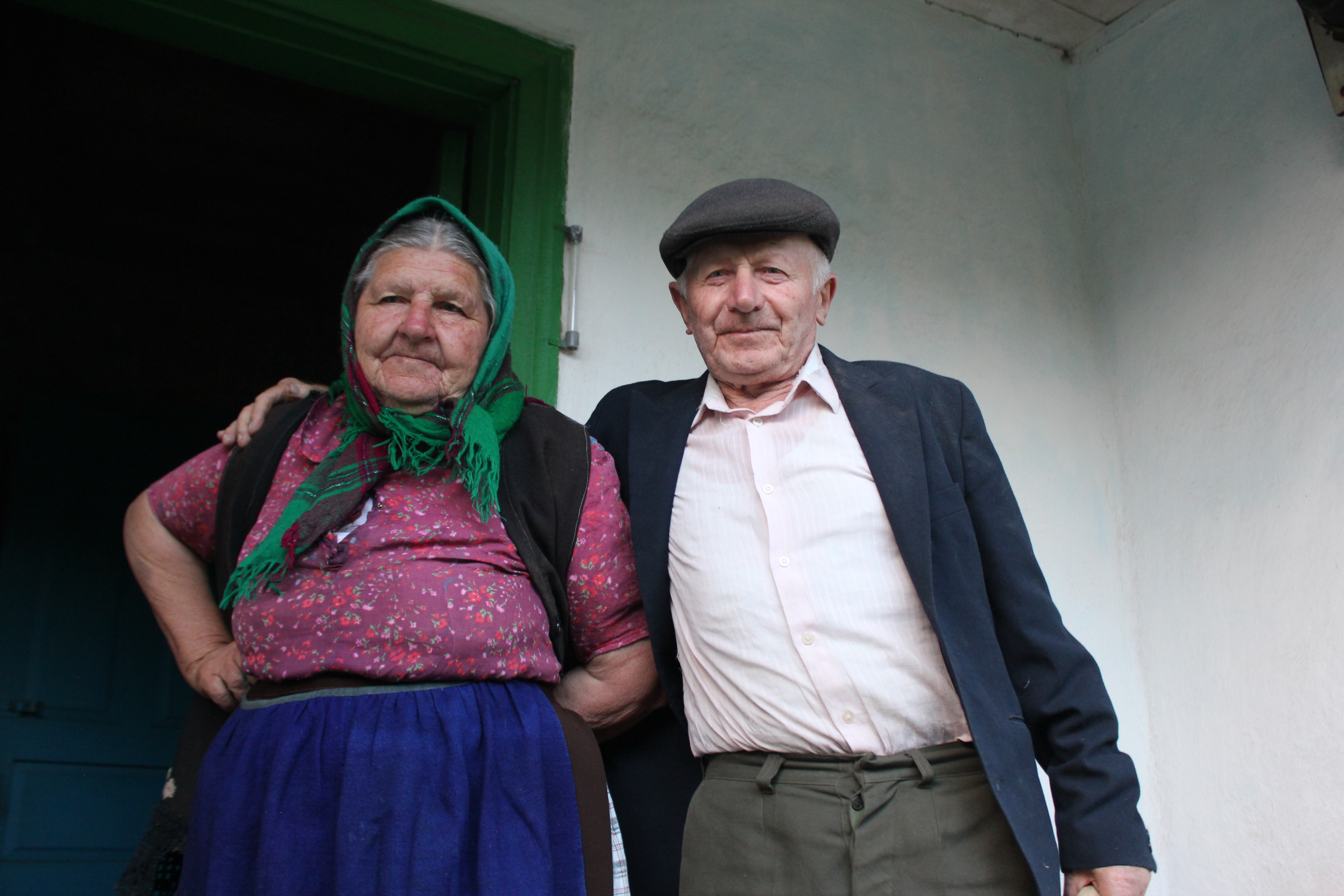
Doukhobors of Slavyanka

== Present day ==
Despite significant emigration, Slavyanka still maintains ethnically Russian (Molokan and Doukhobor) population,

The village is served by a paved road that runs from Ağamalı via Slavyanka to the district center, Gadabay.
