= Çanaqçı, Gadabay =

Çanaqçı
- Municipality
- Location within Azerbaijan
- Coordinates: 40°41′11″N 45°45′47″E
- Country: Azerbaijan
- Rayon: Gadabay

Population
  - Total: 1,571
- Time zone: UTC+4 (AZT)
  - Summer (DST): UTC+5 (AZT)

Çanaqçı (known as Ağamalı until 2011) is a village and municipality in the Gadabay Rayon of Azerbaijan. It has a population of 1,571.

It is located within 7 kilometers from the old Doukhobor-Molokan village of Slavyanka in the Lesser Caucasus Mountains along the river Misderesi. At the entrance to the village is a monument to residents who died in World War II.

It was named Ağamalı in 1929 in honour of Samad aga Agamalioglu. In 2011 the name was officially changed to Çanaqçı.

== Social and economic institutions ==
The municipality contains general secondary schools, a hospital, livestock farms, grocery stores, a bakery, a machine and tractor station, a local radio and phone unit.
