= Samad aga Agamalioglu =

Azerbaijani politician

Samad aga Agamalioglu Səməd ağa Ağamalıoğlu
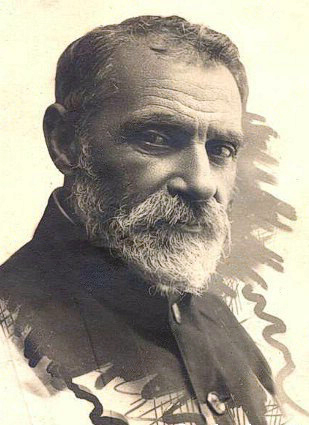

People's Commissar of Agriculture of the Azerbaijan SSR
- In office 1920–1920

2nd President of the CEC of Azerbaijan SSR
- In office 6 May 1922 – 18 September 1929
- Preceded by: Mukhtar Hajiyev
- Succeeded by: Sultan Majid Afandiyev; Gazanfar Musabekov

Personal details
- Born: Samad Hasan oghlu Aliyev; 27 December 1867 Qazakh, Russian Azerbaijan
- Died: 6 October 1930 (aged 62) Moscow, Russia
- Party: Communist Party of the Soviet Union
- Profession: Surveyor

Samad aga Agamalioglu (Azerbaijani: Səməd ağa Ağamalıoğlu; Russian: Самед ага Агамалыоглы; 27 December 1867 – 6 October 1930) was a Soviet statesman, socialist revolutionary, and a participant in the Russian Revolution of 1905 in the Caucasus.

Agamalioglu (real name Samad Hasan oghlu Aliyev) was born in the village of Kyrah Kesemen of Qazakh district, Elisabethpol Governorate to peasant parents. He graduated from Vladikavkaz military school, trained as a surveyor. In 1887 he entered the military service of Ganja. He later started to read about Marxism and became a socialist revolutionary and active member of Muslim Social Democratic Party. After the February Revolution of 1917, he became a member of the Board and executive committee of the Russian Social Democratic Labour Party in Ganja, actively participating in the Hummet activities. From the end of 1918, he worked in Baku. He was chosen as a deputy to the Muslim Socialist Bloc in the Azerbaijani National Council of the Azerbaijan Democratic Republic. Soon after the overthrow of Musavat rule, Agamalioglu became a member of the People's Commissariat of Azerbaijan SSR and in 1922–29, he served as the CEC Chairman and as one of the chairmen of the CEC of the Transcaucasian Socialist Federative Soviet Republic. At the 1st Congress of Soviets of the USSR (1922), he was elected a member of the CEC of the USSR, then a member of the Presidium of the USSR Central Executive Committee. He led the introduction of romanized alphabet to the republics of the Soviet East. Agamalioglu is also author of several works on the revolutionary movement, the Cultural Revolution in the eastern parts of the Soviet Union. He was also the first preparer and the publisher of the famous Kamaluddovle Mektublari by the celebrated Azerbaijani playwright Mirza Fatali Akhundov. The cultural icon of the era, Maxim Gorky, called Agamalioglu a "marvelous man" and highly appreciated his works on the newly reformed alphabet. He died in Moscow in 1930.

There are streets named after him in the Republic of Azerbaijan. The villages of Ağamalıoğlu in Goranboy region and (until 2011) Ağamalı in Gadabay region were named in his honour.

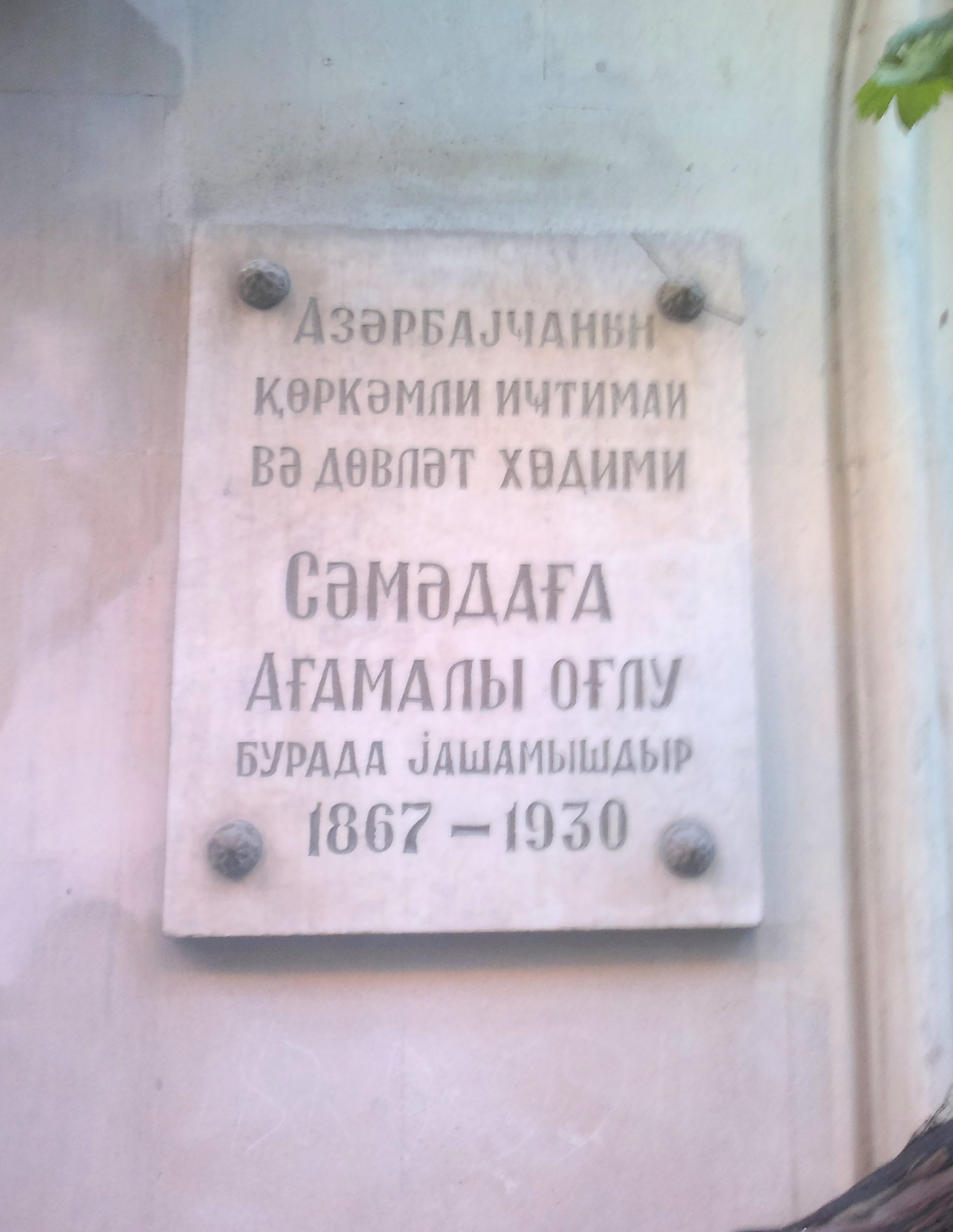
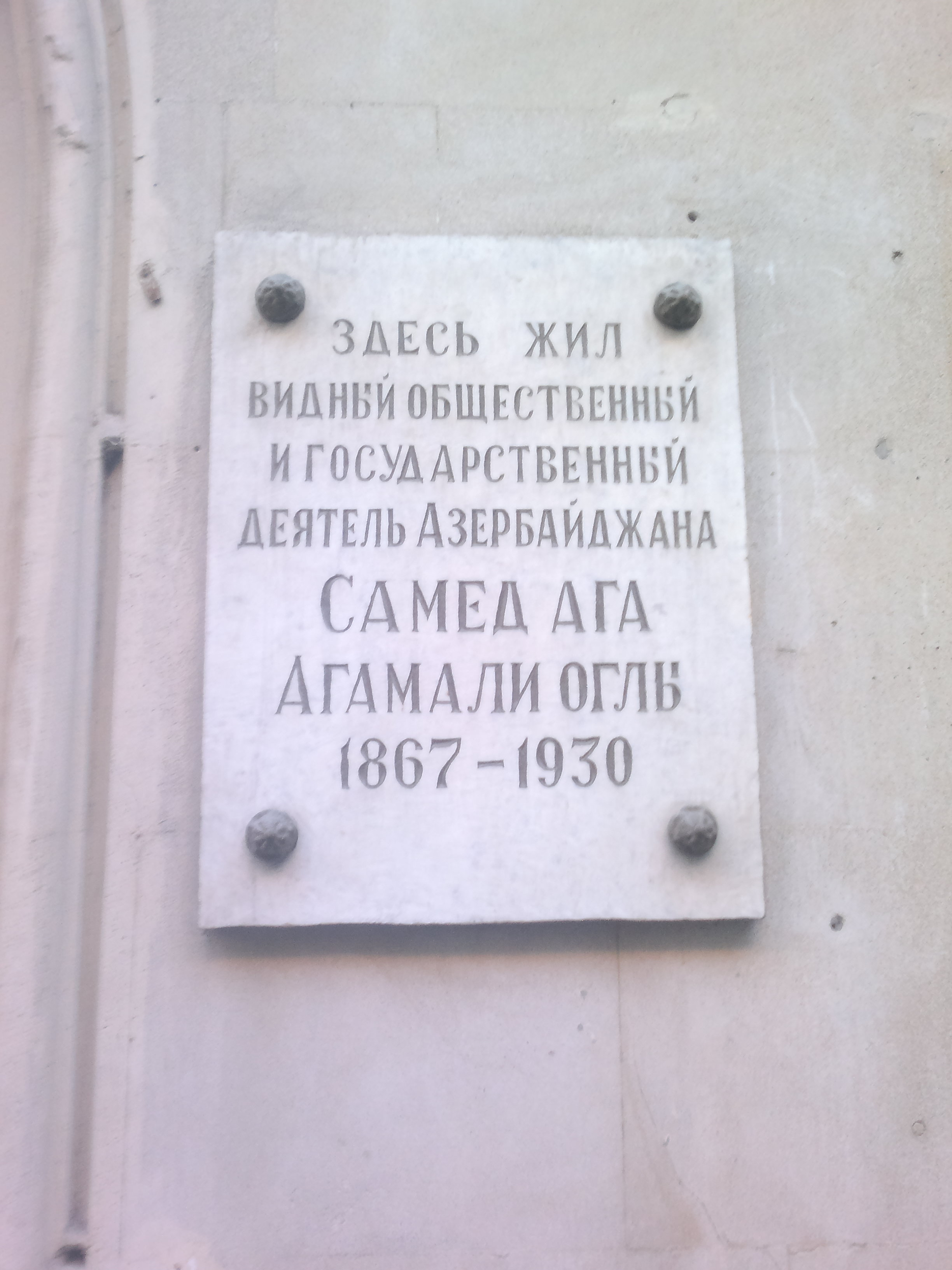
Memorial plaques on the wall of the house in Baku where Agamalioglu lived, in Azerbaijani (left) and Russian (right)
