= Maarif, Azerbaijan =

Maarif
- Location within Azerbaijan
- Coordinates: 40°38′12″N 45°49′25″E
- Country: Azerbaijan
- Rayon: Gadabay
- Municipality: Slavyanka
- Time zone: UTC+4 (AZT)
  - Summer (DST): UTC+5 (AZT)

Maarif (also, Maarifkend) is a village in the Gadabay Rayon of Azerbaijan. The village forms part of the municipality of Slavyanka.
