= Myrna Dey =

Canadian writer

Myrna Dey is a Canadian writer, whose debut novel Extensions was a longlisted nominee for the 2011 Scotiabank Giller Prize. It was the first novel ever named to the longlist through the award's new Readers' Choice program, which allowed the general public to nominate books for award consideration.

A native of Calgary, Alberta, Dey studied at the University of Alberta and the University of California, Berkeley. She currently lives in Kamsack, Saskatchewan with her husband, a dentist. She has published short stories and journalism in Reader's Digest, Canadian Living, the National Post, The Globe and Mail and Maclean's.

Dey was a 2014 semi-finalist in Chatelaine Magazine's "Write for Chatelaine Contest" with a poignant personal essay entitled "Into the Storm" about helping her husband to build a new reality in the wake of dementia.

== Works ==
- Extensions (2010)
