= Peter Makaroff =

Canadian politician (1894–1970)

- Born: May 15, 1894; Kars, Russia
- Died: December 5, 1970 (aged 76); Saskatoon, Canada
- Education: LL.B., University of Saskatchewan, 1918
- Occupations: school teacher, lawyer, politician

Peter George Makaroff (15 May 1894 – 5 December 1970) was a Canadian politician, peace activist, and world federalist.

He was born in Kars, Russia (now northeast Turkey) to a Doukhobor family which emigrated to Canada in 1898 or 1899 with help from Leo Tolstoy and the Religious Society of Friends. Makaroff became the "first Doukhobor in the world to get an education, to receive a university degree, and to enter a profession".

Soon after earning a Bachelor of Laws degree in 1918, Makaroff established a law practice in Saskatoon, Canada. He defended the spiritual leader of the Doukhobors from deportation to the Soviet Union in 1933. In 1935, with attorney Emmett Hall, he successfully defended the unemployed men arrested in connection with the Regina Riot of 1935.

Makaroff became close friends with J.S. Woodsworth, founder of the socialist Co-operative Commonwealth Federation (CCF), and ran as a CCF candidate in the 1934 Saskatchewan general election and the 1940 Canadian federal election. A long-time member of the Fellowship of Reconciliation, he endowed the World Federalist Prize "for the best annual essay relating to world peace through world law".
