= Veregin =

Community in Saskatchewan, Canada

Coordinates: 51°35′00″N 102°04′53″W

Veregin is a special service area in Saskatchewan, Canada. It is located 50 kilometres northeast of Yorkton and 10 km to the west of Kamsack within the Rural Municipality of Sliding Hills No. 273. Access is from both Highway 5 and Highway 637.

Veregin was incorporated as a village in 1912 and was named after the Veregin Station (built 1908), and misspelled by the railroad when it earlier built the misspelled Veregin Siding in 1904, named after Peter V. Verigin. The Veregin railway station is served by Via Rail.

Preceding station	Via Rail	Following station
Mikado toward Churchill	Winnipeg–Churchill	Kamsack toward Winnipeg
Former services
Preceding station	Canadian National Railway	Following station
Mikado toward Calgary	Calgary – Winnipeg	Kamsack toward Winnipeg

== History ==
Veregin owes its existence to the Doukhobors, in the middle of whose 1899 block settlement, known as the South Doukobor Colony its future site happened to be, and the Canadian Northern Railway, whose new line (between Kamsack and Canora) crossed the reserve in 1904. The site of the future village of Veregin — which also happened to be the closest point where the new rail line came to the village of Otradnoye (some 10 km north of Veregin) where the residence and headquarters of the Doukhobor leader, Peter Verigin was at the time — was chosen as the place for the railway station to serve the Doukhobor reserve.

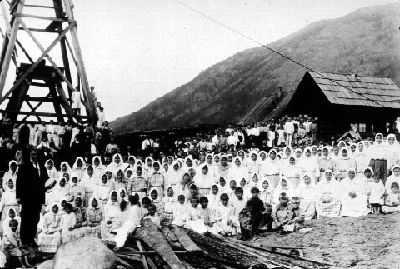
Veregin in 1907

The new station, originally known as Veregin Siding, and since 1908 as Veregin station, was named after Peter Verigin. (Veregin appears a common spelling variant of the surname Verigin, fairly common among the Doukhobors. In fact, the village name is spelt as Verigin' on the letterhead of Peter Verigin-led Christian Community of Universal Brotherhood in the 1920s, and, on occasions, in the report of BC Royal Commission of 1912.)

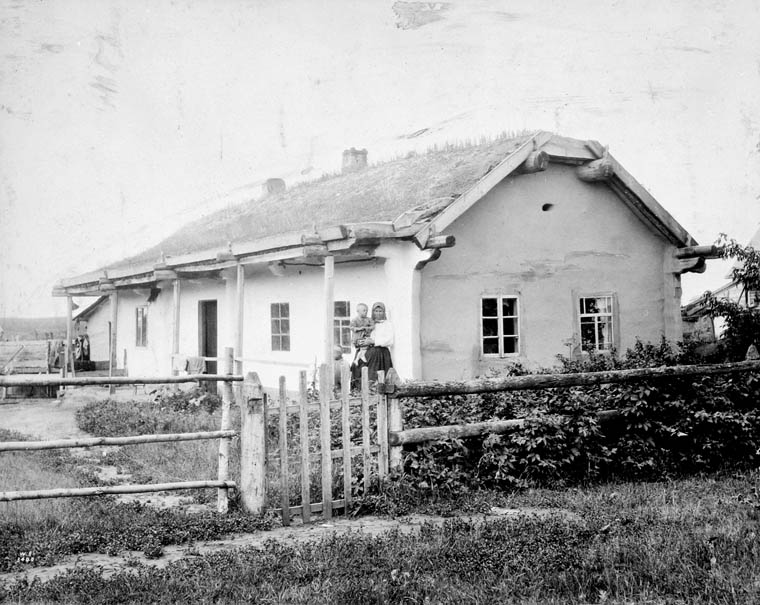
A Doukhobour home in Veregin, 1911

A new village started to be growing near the Veregin train station. Peter Verigin moved his residence and the headquarters to Veregin from Otradnoye in 1904. The BC Royal Commission report of 1912 mentions the village (spelt as Verigin) as the site of what it terms "the head office of the Doukhobor Community".

Veregin soon became an important Doukhobor settlement in the region. Brickworks, grain elevators, a floor mill were built there. While the early annual general meetings of the Doukhobor Community continued to take place in the village of Nadezhda, some 10 km to the north of Veregin, Veregin became the site of the annual meetings no later than January 1910.

When the Peter Verigin-led Doukhobor Community was legally incorporated as the Christian Community of Universal Brotherhood (CCUB) in 1917, the headquarters of the organization was based in the village of Veregin as well, even though the majority of the CCUB members had already moved to British Columbia by that time. CCUB headquarters remained in Veregin until its relocation to British Columbia in 1931.

With the bankruptcy of CCUB in 1937–38, the facilities owned by the community were sold or destroyed.

In 1980, the 1917-built Verigin's mansion was restored. In 2006, it and a few other Doukhobor buildings have been designated a National Historic Site of Canada under the name "Doukhobors at Veregin".

Two major fires in the community on January 22 and 29, 2004, threatened the viability of the village. Veregin's status as a village was dissolved on December 31, 2006, when it was absorbed into the surrounding Rural Municipality of Sliding Hills No. 273 as a special service area.

== Demographics ==
In the 2021 Census of Population conducted by Statistics Canada, Veregin had a population of 47 living in 28 of its 43 total private dwellings, a change of 4.4% from its 2016 population of 45. With a land area of 1.46 km^{2} (0.56 sq mi), it had a population density of 32.2/km^{2} (83.4/sq mi) in 2021.

Canada census – Veregin community profile

	2011
Population	70 (7.7% from 2006)
Land area	1.52 km^{2} (0.59 sq mi)
Population density	46.2/km^{2} (120/sq mi)
Median age	NA (M: NA, F: NA)
Private dwellings	38 (total)
Median household income	$NA

References: 2011

== See also ==
- List of communities in Saskatchewan
