= Doukhobors =

Ethnoreligious group of Russian origins

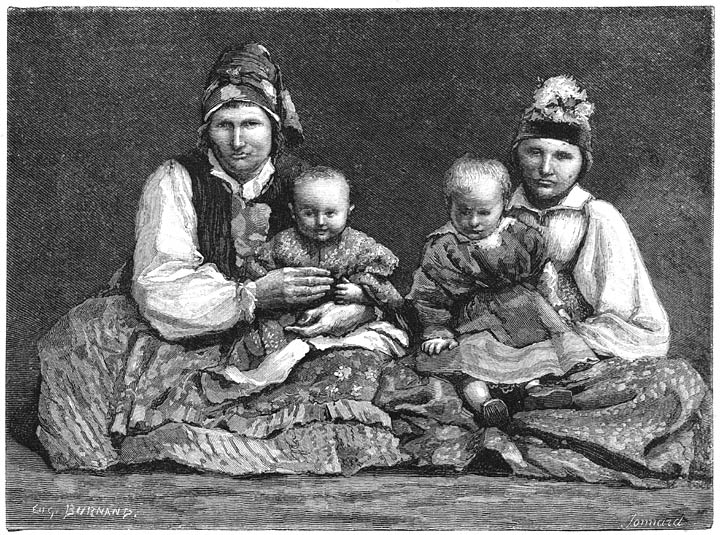
- Doukhobour women, 1887

Founder
- Siluan Kolesnikov (17??–1775)

Regions with significant populations
- Canada (British Columbia, etc.): 40,000
- Southern Russia: 30,000

Religions
- Spiritual Christianity

Scriptures
- Book of Life (a hymnal)

Languages
- Doukhobor Russian • English

Related ethnic groups
- Other Russians, especially other Russian Spiritual Christians

Website
- doukhobor.org uscc-doukhobors.org

The Doukhobors (Canadian spelling) or Dukhobors (Russian: духоборы, духоборцы, romanized: dukhobory, dukhobortsy; lit. 'Spirit-warriors, Spirit-wrestlers') are a Spiritual Christian ethnoreligious group of Russian origin. They reject the authority of the Russian Orthodox priesthood, icons, and formal church rituals, believing that the journey of each person's spiritual revelations being based on the internalization of the Biblical message, is more important than the physical Bible. They emphasize the presence of God within every person, and pacifism.

The Doukhobors were repeatedly persecuted by the Russian government for their religious beliefs and refusal of military service. After periods of internal exile and resettlement, about one-third of the community emigrated to Canada between 1899 and 1938 with assistance from Quakers, Leo Tolstoy, and other supporters. Most Doukhobors today live in Canada, particularly in British Columbia, Saskatchewan, and Alberta, although communities also remain in the former Soviet Union.

Historically, Doukhobors lived in communal agricultural villages, practised communal living, and preserved a rich tradition of oral history, hymn-singing, and verse. In Canada, disputes over communal land ownership, citizenship requirements, education, and leadership led to divisions within the movement. The principal groups included the Christian Community of Universal Brotherhood, the Union of Spiritual Communities of Christ, Independent Doukhobors, and the radical Sons of Freedom movement.

The movement's origins are uncertain, although it first appears in written records in 1701. The name Doukhobor, originally used as a pejorative by a Russian Orthodox archbishop, was later adopted by the group and reinterpreted as meaning "Wrestlers for and with the Spirit".

== History ==
In the 17th-and-18th-century Russian Empire, the first recorded Doukhobors concluded clergy and formal rituals are unnecessary, believing in God's presence in every human being. They rejected the secular government, the Russian Orthodox priests, icons, all church rituals, and the belief the Bible is a supreme source of divine revelation. The Doukhobors believed in the divinity of Jesus; their practices, emphasis on individual interpretation, and opposition to the government and church provoked antagonism from the government and the established Russian Eastern Orthodox Church. In 1734, the Russian government issued an edict against ikonobortsy (those who reject icons), condemning them as iconoclasts.

The first-known Doukhobor leader was Siluan (Silvan) Kolesnikov (Russian: Силуан Колесников), who was active from 1755 to 1775. Kolesnikov lived in the village of Nikolskoye, in the Yekaterinoslav Governorate, in modern-day south-central Ukraine. Kolesnikov was familiar with the works of Western mystics such as Karl von Eckartshausen and Louis Claude de Saint-Martin. The Molokans split in 1779 and 1780 from the Doukhobors because they thought that the Doukhobors neglected the Bible; in their belief, God had placed the Word directly into their hearts. The Molokans, however, held the written Bible in the highest regard. The founder of the Molokans, Semyon Matveevich Uklein (1733–1809), was a son-in-law of the Doukhobor leader Ilarion Poberokhin (1720–1792).

The early Doukhobors called themselves "God's People" or just "Christians." Their modern name, first in the form Doukhobortsy (Russian: духоборцы, dukhobortsy ("Spirit wrestlers") ) is thought to have been first used in 1785 or 1786 by Ambrosius, Archbishop of Yekaterinoslav or his predecessor Nikephoros Theotokis. (Note: Nikifor was styled "Archbishop of Slavyansk and Kherson" (Славенский и Херсонский), while his successor, who was also called Ambrosius, was "Archbishop of Yekaterinoslav and Kherson" because the diocese was renamed in 1786. The seat of the archbishops was in Poltava.) The archbishop's intent was to mock the Doukhobors as heretics fighting against the Holy Spirit (Russian: Святой Дух, Svyatoy Dukh) but around the beginning of the 19th century, according to SA Inikova, the dissenters adopted the name "Doukhobors" usually in a shorter form Doukhobory (Russian: духоборы, dukhobory), implying they are fighting alongside rather than against the Holy Spirit. The first known use of the spelling Doukhobor is in a 1799 government edict exiling 90 of the group to Finland; presumably the Vyborg area, which was part of the Russian Empire at the time, for producing anti-war propaganda.

The early Doukhobors were pacifists who rejected military institutions and war and were thus oppressed in Imperial Russia. Both the tsarist state and church authorities were involved in the persecution and deprivation of the dissidents' normal freedoms.

In 1802, Tsar Alexander I encouraged the resettlement of religious minorities to the "Milky Waters" (Molochnye Vody) region around the Molochnaya River around Melitopol in modern-day southern Ukraine. This was motivated by the desire to quickly populate the rich steppe lands on the north shore of the Black and Azov Seas, and to prevent the "heretics" from contaminating the population of the heartland with their ideas. Many Doukhobors, as well as Mennonites from Prussia, accepted the Emperor's offer and travelled to the Molochnaya from other provinces of the Empire over the next 20 years.

=== Transcaucasian exile ===
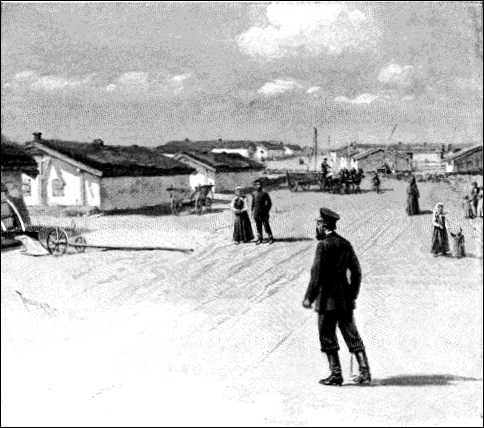
The village of Gorelovka in southern Georgia, the "capital" of the Doukhobors of Transcaucasia (1893)

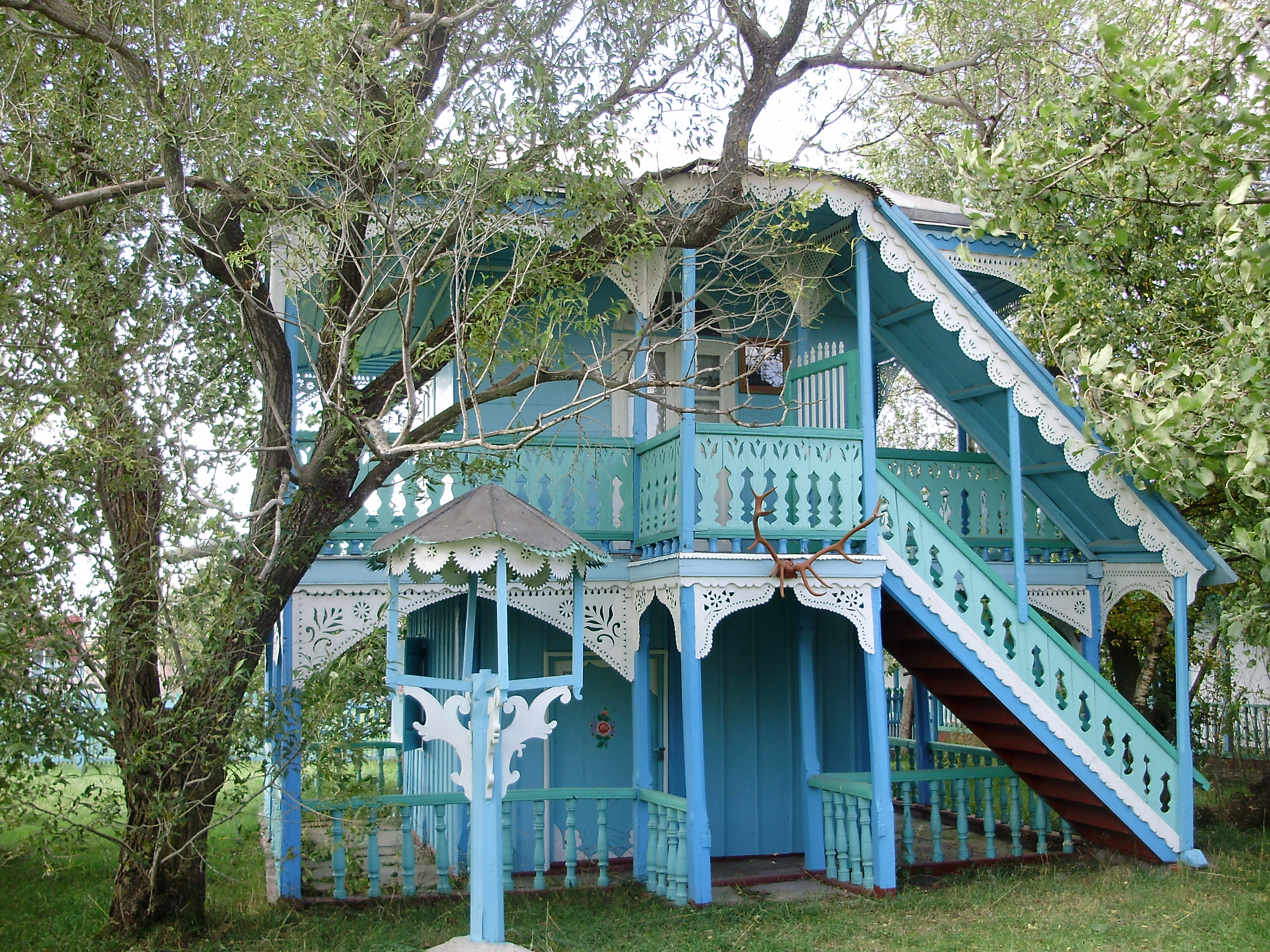
The Doukhobor worship place in Georgia

When Nicholas I succeeded Alexander as Tsar, on February 6, 1826, he issued a decree intending to force the assimilation of the Doukhobors through military conscription, prohibiting their meetings, and encouraging conversions to the established church. On October 20, 1830, another decree followed, specifying all able-bodied members of dissenting religious groups engaged in propaganda against the established church should be conscripted and sent to the Russian army in the Caucasus while those not capable of military service, and their women and children, should be resettled in Russia's recently acquired Transcaucasian provinces. With other dissenters, around 5,000 Doukhobors were resettled in Georgia between 1841 and 1845. Akhalkalaki uyezd (district) in the Tiflis Governorate was chosen as the main place of their settlement. Doukhobor villages with Russian names appeared there; Gorelovka, Rodionovka, Yefremovka, Orlovka, Spasskoye (Dubovka), Troitskoye, and Bogdanovka. Later, other groups of Doukhobors were resettled by the government or migrated to Transcaucasia of their own accord. They also settled in neighbouring areas, including the Borchaly uyezd of Tiflis Governorate and the Kedabek uyezd of Elisabethpol Governorate.

In 1844, Doukhobors who were being exiled from their home near Melitopol to the village of Bogdanovka carved the Doukhobor Memorial Stone, which is held in the collection of the Melitopol Museum of Local History.

After Russia's conquest of Kars and the Treaty of San Stefano of 1878, some Doukhobors from Tiflis and Elisabethpol Governorates moved to the Zarushat and Shuragel uyezds of the newly created Kars Oblast to the north-east of Kars in the modern-day Republic of Turkey. The leader of the main group of Doukhobors, who arrived in Transcaucasia from Ukraine in 1841, was Illarion Kalmykov (Russian: Илларион Калмыков). He died in the same year and was succeeded as the community leader by his son Peter Kalmykov (?–1864). After Peter Kalmykov's death in 1864, his widow Lukerya Vasilyevna Gubanova (? – December 15, 1886; (Russian: Лукерья Васильевна Губанова); also known as Kalmykova) took his leadership position.

The Kalmykov dynasty lived in the village of Gorelovka, a Doukhobor community in Georgia. Lukerya was respected by the provincial authorities, who had to cooperate with the Doukhobors. At the time of her death in 1886, there were around 20,000 Doukhobors in Transcaucasia. By that time, the region's Doukhobors had become vegetarian and were aware of Leo Tolstoy's philosophy, which they found quite similar to their own traditional teachings.

=== Religious revival and crises ===
The death of Lukerya, who had no children, was followed by a leadership crisis that divided the Dukhobortsy in the Caucasus into three groups (one major, two minor) which disputed their next leader. Lukerya wanted leadership to pass to her assistant Peter Vasilevich Verigin. Although most of the community—"the Large Party" Russian: Большая сторона, romanized: Bolshaya Storona—accepted him as the leader, a minority faction known as "the Small Party" (Малая сторона Malaya Storona) rejected Verigin, and sided with Lukerya's brother Michael Gubanov and the village elder Aleksei Zubkov.

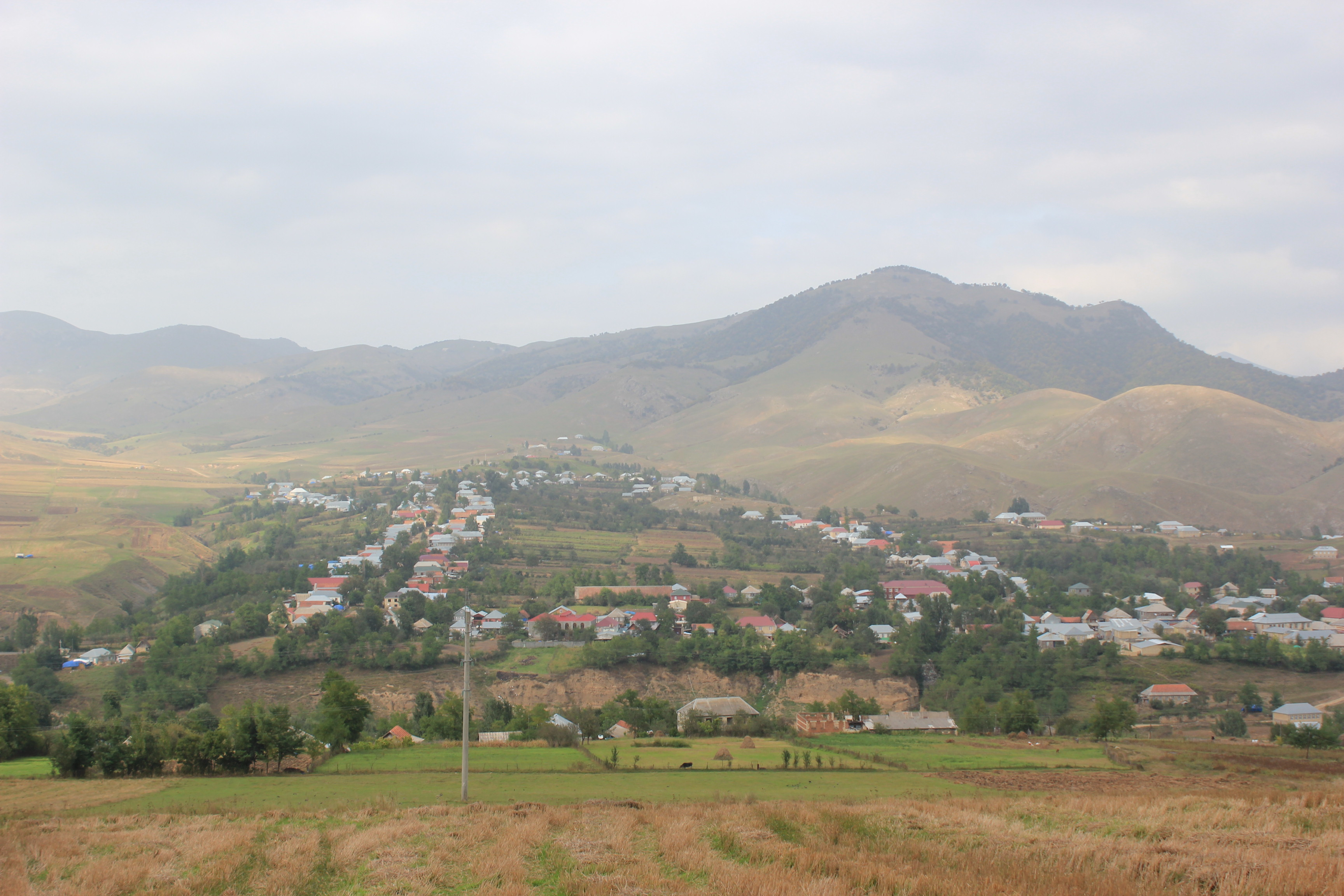
The Doukhobor village in Slavyanka Azerbaijan 2018

While the Large Party was a majority, the Small Party had the support of the older members of the community and the local authorities. On January 26, 1887, at a community service at which the new leader was to be acclaimed, police arrived and arrested Verigin. He, along with some of his associates, was sent into internal exile in Siberia. Large Party Doukhobors continued to consider Verigin their spiritual leader and to communicate with him, by mail and via delegates who travelled to see him in Obdorsk. An isolated population of exiled Doukhobors, a third "party", was about 5,000 miles (8,000 km) east in Amur Oblast.

At the same time, the Russian government applied greater pressure to enforce the Doukhobors' compliance with its laws and regulations. The Doukhobors had resisted registering marriages and births, contributing grain to state emergency funds, and swearing oaths of allegiance. In 1887, Russia extended universal military conscription, which applied to the rest of the empire, to the Transcaucasian provinces. While the Small Party cooperated with the state, the Large Party, reacting to the arrest of their leaders and inspired by their letters from exile, felt strengthened in their desire to abide by the righteousness of their faith. Under instructions from Verigin, the Large Party stopped using tobacco and alcohol, divided their property equally among the members of the community, and resolved to adhere to the practice of pacifism and non-violence. They refused to swear the oath of allegiance required in 1894 by the newly ascended Tsar Nicholas II.

Under further instructions from Verigin, about 7,000 of the most zealous Doukhobors—about one-third of all Doukhobors—of the three Governorates of Transcaucasia destroyed their weapons and refused to serve in the military. As the Doukhobors gathered to burn their guns on the night of June 28/29 (July 10/11, Gregorian calendar) 1895, while singing psalms and spiritual songs, government Cossacks arrested and beat them. Shortly after, the government billeted Cossacks in many of the Large Party's villages; around 4,000 Doukhobors were forced to disperse to villages in other parts of Georgia. Many died of starvation and exposure.

=== First emigrants ===
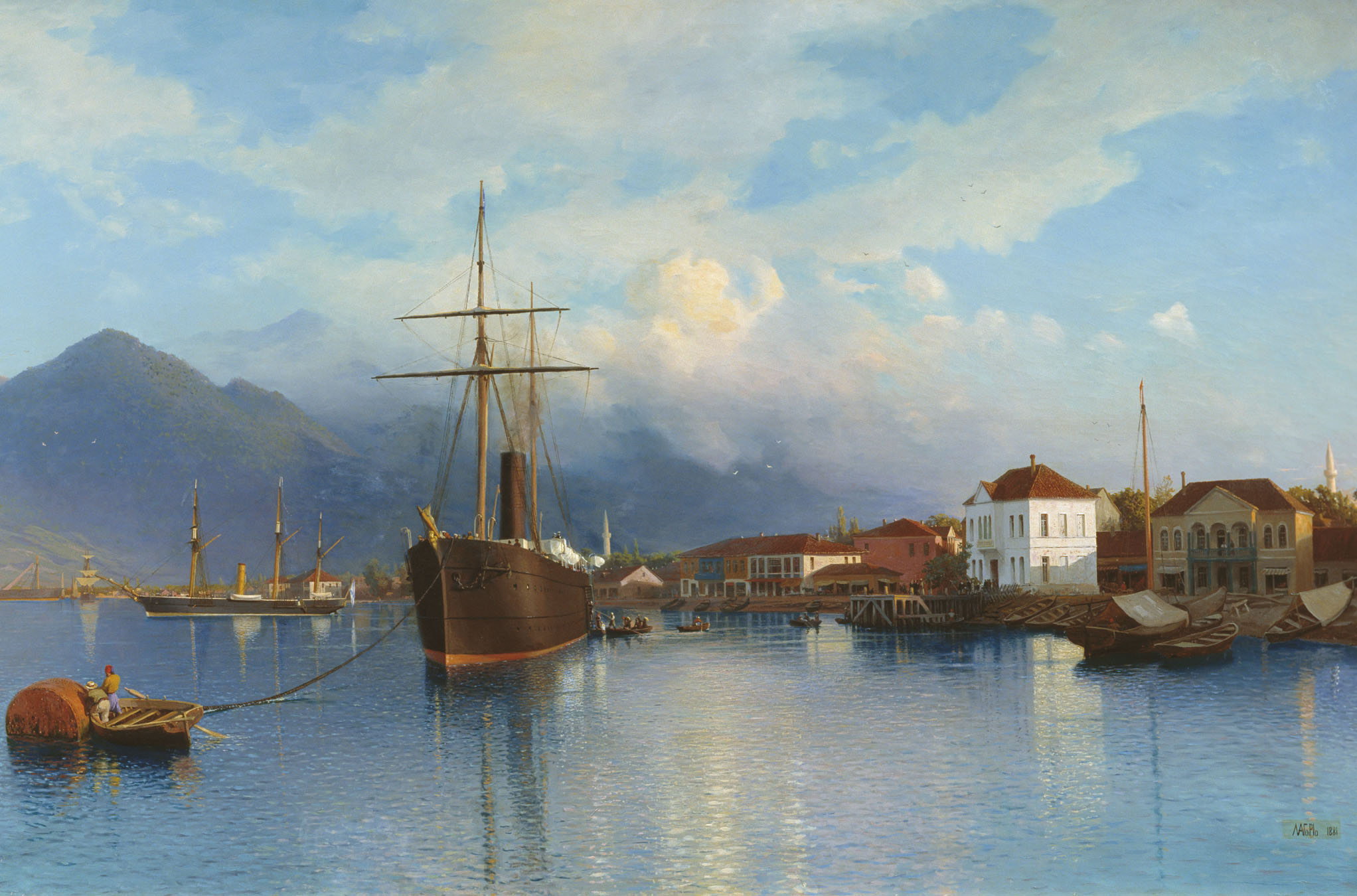
The port of Batumi as it was in 1881. Here the Doukhobors embarked on their transatlantic journey in 1898 and 1899

The resistance of the Doukhobors gained international attention and the Russian Empire was criticized for its treatment of this religious minority. In 1897, the Russian government agreed to let the Doukhobors leave the country, subject to conditions:

- emigrants should never return;
- emigrants must emigrate at their own expense;
- community leaders in prison or exile in Siberia must serve the balance of their sentences before they could leave Russia.

Emigrants initially attempted to settle in Cyprus. Cyprus was, at the time, recognized as a possession of the Ottoman Empire, but in the wake of the Russo-Turkish War (1877–1878), the Ottoman Empire had granted the United Kingdom the right to administer the island in exchange for support in its continuing conflict with the Russian Empire. This fact made the potential settlement of the Russian Doukhobors a politically-sensitive question among some in the British government, but after Quaker supporters both made assurances of the Doukhobors' political inoffensiveness and provided financial guarantees against their potential indigency, officials permitted over 1,000 Doukhobors to establish farming settlements in several locations on the island beginning in the second half of 1898. However, the Cyprus experiment soon proved to be disastrous: beset by disease (made worse by insufficient food that met the Doukhobors' religious requirements) as well as internal disagreements over community organization, nearly ten percent of the colony died by early 1899.

Canada offered more land, transportation, and aid to resettle in the Saskatchewan area. Around 6,000 Doukhobors emigrated there in the first half of 1899, settling on land granted to them by the government in modern-day Manitoba, Saskatchewan, and Alberta. The remaining Cyprus colony and others joined them, and around 7,500 Russian Doukhobor emigrants—about a third of their number in Russia—arrived in Canada by the end of the year. Several smaller groups joined the main body of emigrants in later years, coming directly from Transcaucasia and other places of exile. Among these latecomers were 110 leaders of the community who had to complete their sentences before being allowed to emigrate. By 1930, about 8,780 Doukhobors had migrated from Russia to Canada.

The Quakers and Tolstoyan movement covered most of the costs of passage for the emigrants; writer Leo Tolstoy arranged for the royalties from his novel Resurrection, his story Father Sergei, and some others to go to the emigration fund. Tolstoy also raised money from wealthy friends; his efforts provided about 30,000 rubles, half of the emigration fund. The anarchist Peter Kropotkin and professor of political economy at the University of Toronto James Mavor also helped the emigrants.

The emigrants adapted to life in agricultural communes; they were mostly of peasant origin and had low regard for advanced education. (Note: Not until 1918 did Peter Makaroff become the "first Doukhobor in the world to get an education, to receive a university degree, and to enter a profession".) Many worked as loggers, lumbermen, and carpenters. Eventually, many left the communal dormitories and became private farmers on the Canadian plains. Religious a cappella singing, pacifism, and passive resistance were markers of the sect. One subgroup occasionally demonstrated naked, typically as a protest against compulsory military service. Their policies made them controversial. The modern descendants of the first wave of Doukhobor emigrants continue to live in southeastern British Columbia communities such as Krestova, and in southern Alberta and Saskatchewan. As of 1999, the estimated population of Doukhobor descent in North America was 40,000 in Canada and about 5,000 in the United States.

=== Canadian prairies ===
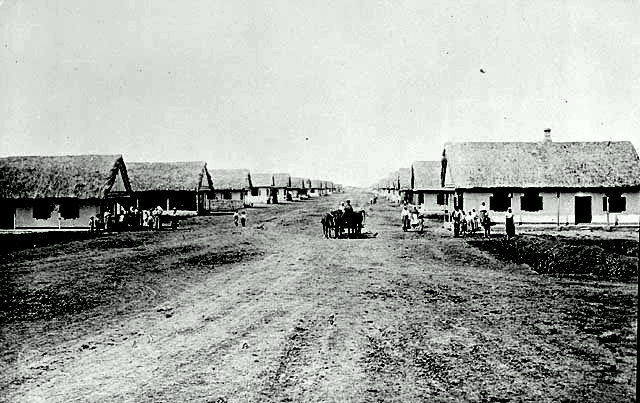
Vosnesenia ('Ascension') village, NE of Arran, Saskatchewan (North Colony). A typical one-street village, modelled on those in the Old World.

In accordance with the Dominion Lands Act of 1872, for a nominal fee of CA$10, the Canadian government would grant 160 acres (0.65 km^{2}) of land to any male homesteader who was able to establish a working farm on that land within three years. Single-family homesteads would not fit the Doukhobors' communitarian tradition but a "Hamlet Clause" within the Act had been adopted 15 years earlier to accommodate other communitarian groups such as Mennonites. The clause allowed beneficiaries of the Act to live in a hamlet within 3 miles (4.8 km) from their land rather than on the land itself. This allowed the Doukhobors to establish a communal lifestyle similar to that of the Hutterites. Also, by passing Section 21 of the Dominion Military Act in late 1898, the Canadian Government exempted the Doukhobors from military service.

The land for the Doukhobor immigrants, in total 773,400 acres (3,130 km^{2}) within what was to soon become the Province of Saskatchewan, came in three block settlement areas or "reserves", and an annex:

- The North Colony, also known as the "Thunder Hill Colony" or "Swan River Colony" in the Pelly and Arran districts of Saskatchewan became home to 2,400 Doukhobors from Tiflis Governorate, who established 20 villages on 69,000 acres (280 km^{2}) of the land grant.
- The South Colony, also known as the "Whitesand Colony" or "Yorkton Colony" in the Canora, Veregin and Kamsack districts of Saskatchewan. 3,500 Doukhobors from Tiflis Governorate, Elisabethpol Governorate, and Kars Oblast settled there in 30 villages on 215,010 acres (870.1 km^{2}) of land grant.
- The Good Spirit Lake Annex in the Buchanan district of Saskatchewan received 1,000 Doukhobors from Elisabethpol Governorate and Kars Oblast, Russia, and settled there in eight villages on 168,930 acres (683.6 km^{2}) of land grant. The annex was along the Good Spirit River, which flows into Good Spirit Lake (previously known as Devil's Lake).
- The Saskatchewan Colony, also known as the "Rosthern Colony", "Prince Albert Colony" and "Duck Lake Colony" was located along North Saskatchewan River in the Langham and Blaine Lake districts of Saskatchewan, north-west of Saskatoon. 1,500 Doukhobors from Kars Oblast settled there in 13 villages on 324,800 acres (1,314 km^{2}) of land grant.

North and South Colonies, and Good Spirit Lake Annex, were located around Yorkton near the modern-day border with Manitoba; the Saskatchewan (Rosthern) Colony was located north-west of Saskatoon, a significant distance from the other three reserves.

In 1899, all four reserves formed part of the Northwest Territories: Saskatchewan (Rosthern) Colony in the territories' provisional District of Saskatchewan. North Reserve straddled the boundary of Saskatchewan and Assiniboia districts, and the other reserves were entirely in Assiniboia. After the establishment of the Province of Saskatchewan in 1905, all reserves were located within that province.

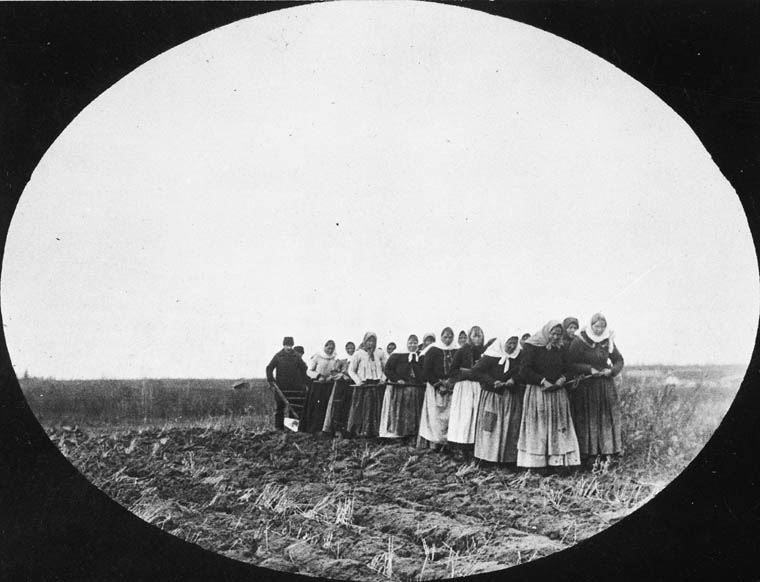
Doukhobor women pulling a plow, Thunder Hill Colony, Manitoba

Arriving in Canada, the first years there was not enough money to pay for livestock. The women were agriculture leaders and resourceful. Pulling the plows themselves, while the men steered to ensure crops were planted. On the lands granted to them in the prairies, the settlers established Russian-style villages, some of which received Russian names after settlers' home villages in Transcaucasia; for example Spasovka, Large and Small Gorelovka, and Slavianka; while others gained more abstract "spiritual" names not common in Russia, such as Uspeniye (Dormition), Terpeniye (Patience), Bogomdannoye (Given by God), and Osvobozhdeniye (Liberation). The settlers found Saskatchewan winters much harsher than those in Transcaucasia, and expressed disappointment the climate was not as suitable for growing fruits and vegetables. Women greatly outnumbered the men; many women worked on the farms tilling the land while many men took non-farm jobs, especially in railway construction. The earliest arrivals came from three backgrounds, had varying commitments to communal life, and lacked leadership. Verigin arrived in December 1902, was recognized as the leader, and reimposed communalism and self-sufficiency. The railway arrived in 1904 and hopes of isolation from Canadian society ended.

==== Popular distrust ====
Canadians, their politicians, and the media were deeply suspicious of the Doukhobors. Their communal lifestyle seemed suspicious, their refusal to send children to school was considered deeply troubling, while pacifism caused anger during the First World War. The oppression of the Russian Tsarist regime had entrenched its resulting pacifist beliefs into the Doukhobor tenets and they did not waver with the onset of either World War. Some Canadians who were willing to go to war did not respect a sect of people that were excused from military service. This difference in perspective produced much political prejudice towards the Doukhobors. Tumultuous political posturing and years of polarized social disagreements eventually brought some Doukhobors to the point of protests aimed at maintaining their simple, non-materialistic, and autonomous communal living. The break-away faction of svobodniki, later called Sons of Freedom, conducted nude marches and carried out night-time arson attacks, which was considered unacceptable and offensive. Canadian magazines showed strong curiosity, giving special attention to women's bodies and clothing. Magazines and newspapers carried stories and photographs of Doukhobor women engaging in hard farm labour, doing "women's work", wearing the traditional ethnic dress, and in partial or total states of undress. Doukhobors received financial help from Quakers. Clifford Sifton, the Minister of the Interior, wanted the Doukhobors in Canada; he arranged financial subsidies to allow them to migrate.

==== Loss of land rights ====
Due to the community's aversion to private ownership of land, Verigin had the land registered in the name of the community. By 1906, the Canadian Government's new Minister of the Interior Frank Oliver started requiring the registration of land in the name of individual owners. Many Doukhobors refused to comply, resulting in 1907 in the reverting of more than a third (258,880 acres (1,047.7 km^{2})) of Doukhobor lands back to the Crown. The loss of legal title to their land became a major grievance and contributed to a three-way schism of Canadian Doukhobors.

=== Schism ===
Ten years after the Russian conscription crisis, another political issue arose because the Doukhobors would have to become naturalized British citizens and swear an Oath of Allegiance to the British Crown — something that had always been against their principles. They did not know that they could have submitted an "affirmation" instead of an "oath".

Upon immigration in 1899 all arriving Doukhobors were united by the common communal land grants in present day Saskatchewan on which over 60 communal villages were established. Upon arrival of Peter V. Verigin from Russia in December 1902 they had already begun to divide into three distinct groups — his followers, non-followers, and zealots who sometimes protested in the nude.

The "oath" issue was the major caused of this three-way split with other issues being mandatory public education, and some protesting against other Doukhobors for attending schools, taking oaths to get their own land, etc. The complex interactions divided families and friends, and often people switched among the three divisions, or abandoned their heritage faith and culture entirely.

These us versus them divisions created a few epithets for the "other" groups which described their differences.

==== Community Doukhobors ====
Historically the called "communal" (Russian: общие / obshchie) Doukhobors, and "orthodox" (correct belief) (Russian: православный / pravoslavnyy) Doukhobors. This largest group in Canada was originally led by Peter V. Verigin (1859-1924) who formed the Christian Community of Universal Brotherhood (CCUB). His successor son Peter P. Verigin (1881-1939) in 1938 reformed members them as the Union of Spiritual Communities of Christ (USCC), headquartered in Grand Forks, British Columbia, publishing a monthly journal Iskra since 1943. In 1939, John J. Verigin (1921–2008), grandson of P.V. Verigin, was appointed to lead, but changed his title to "Honorary Chairman." In 2008, his son John J. Verigin, Jr. continued the hereditary post as a spokesman. Though the USCC is the largest and most visible society of Canadian Doukhobors, it does not officially represent non-members. In the past, for abandoning vegetarianism, some USCC members used the epithet myasniki (Russian: мясники, butchers) for killing animals for food, which in the Doukhobor dialect, also means "meat eater".

- Independent Doukhobors — (Russian: единоличники / edinolichniki, individual farmers). In 1907 they comprised about 10% of the Canadian Doukhobors, maintained their traditions and values, but abandoned communal ownership of land. Most acquired land by affirmation, some by oath. They also rejected hereditary leadership and communal living as non-essential, therefore they have many independent local societies and meeting halls, most in Saskatchewan, and a few in Alberta and British Columbia. The Independents generally integrated sooner into Canadian capitalist society than the USCC families. They took oaths for citizenship, registered their own land, their children attended public schools, intermarried, and most remained in Saskatchewan close to their original land. In 1939, they rejected the authority of the Verigin hereditary leadership, and did not join the CCUB nor the later USCC.
- Sons of Freedom — Abbreviated as "SOF" and "Sons". SOF are not Doukhobors. Originally self-named svobodniki (free/ sovereign people) (Russian: свободники), in 1902 these immigrants tried to return to Russia then to the United States, refused to obey new Canadian laws, and attacked law-abiding Doukhobors. P. V. Verigin banned them from community membership, and Independent Doukhobors repeatedly declared them "not Doukhobors". In the 1920s they were called "Sons of Freedom" (Russian: сыновья свободы / synov'ya svobody) and "Freedomites" by the media. Since 1902, the media, scholars and government have persistently mistakenly confused the svobodniki, and later Sons of Freedom with all Canadian Doukhobors when reporting their sensational protests. Since the 1950s, the USCC and Independent Doukhobors have united in opposition to the SOF. After decades of SOF incarceration, many SOF descendants have integrated into Canadian society and with nearby USCC members and participated in reconciliation efforts.

Beginning in the 2000s, the three divisions united in a common "Doukhobor" heritage, a cultural network of toleration and respect for their family differences. Many have relatives and friends in other divisions, and with non-heritage Doukhobors, and have tried to unite for the common cause of world friendship and peace.

=== British Columbia and Verigin's assassination ===
In 1908, to remove his followers from the corrupting influence of non-Doukhobors and edinolichniki (individual owners) Doukhobors, and to find better conditions for agriculture, Verigin bought large tracts of land in south-eastern British Columbia. His first purchase was around Grand Forks near the US border. He later acquired large tracts of land further east in the Slocan Valley around Castlegar. Between 1908 and 1912, about 8,000 people moved from Saskatchewan to these British Columbia lands to continue their communal way of living. In the milder climate of British Columbia, the settlers were able to plant fruit trees and within a few years became renowned orchardists and producers of fruit preserves. As the Community Doukhobors left Saskatchewan, the reserves there were closed by 1918.

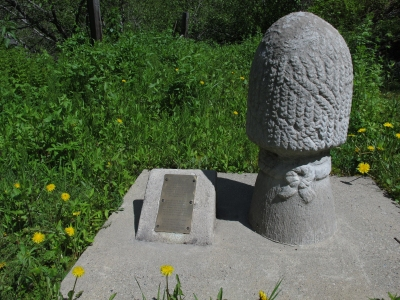
Verigin Memorial

On October 29, 1924, Peter V. Verigin was killed in a bomb explosion on a scheduled passenger train en route to British Columbia. The government had initially stated the bombing was perpetrated by people within the Doukhobor community, although no arrests were made because of the Doukhobors' customary refusal to cooperate with Canadian authorities due to fear of intersect violence. It is still unknown who was responsible for the bombing. While the Doukhobors were initially welcomed by the Canadian government, this assassination, as well as Doukhobors' beliefs regarding communal living, their intolerance for schooling, and other beliefs considered offensive or unacceptable, created a decades-long mistrust between government authorities and Doukhobors.

Peter V. Verigin's son Peter P. Verigin, who arrived from the Soviet Union in 1928, succeeded his father as leader of the Community Doukhobors. He became known as "Peter the Purger" (Chistiakov) and worked to smooth relations between the Community Doukhobors and wider Canadian society. The governments in Ottawa and the western provinces concluded he was the closet leader of the Sons of Freedom and was perhaps a dangerous Bolshevik. The governments decided to deport him, use the justice system to impose conformity to Canadian values on the Doukhobors, and force them to abide by Canadian law and repudiate unacceptable practices. With a legal defence managed by Peter Makaroff, the deportation effort failed in 1933. The Sons of Freedom repudiated Verigin's policies as ungodly and assimilationist, and escalated their protests. The Sons of Freedom burnt Community Doukhobors' property and organized more nude parades. In 1932, the Parliament of Canada responded by criminalizing public nudity. Over 300 radical Doukhobor men and women were arrested for this offence, which typically carried a three-year prison sentence.

=== Voting ===
Doukhobors could not vote in British Columbia until 1952. They were the last ethnic or religious community to be granted suffrage in the province.

=== Nudism and arson ===
The Sons of Freedom, a break away protest sect identifying as svobodniki (sovereign, free people) in 1902, used nudism and arson as visible methods of protest. They protested against materialism, the land seizure by the government, compulsory education in government schools, and Verigin's assassination in 1924. This led to many confrontations with the Canadian government and the Royal Canadian Mounted Police, which continued into the 1970s. Nudism was first used after the Doukhobors' arrival in Canada. They used violence to fight modernity, and destroyed threshing machines and other signs of modernity. The group conducted night-time arson attacks on schools built by the Doukhobor commune and Verigin's house. The highly publicized acts by the Sons of Freedom were repeatedly mislabeled with the word "Doukhobor", confusing the different groups and anguishing many law biding assimilated descendants of Canadian Doukhobors.

During 1947 and 1948, Sullivan's Royal Commission investigated acts of arson and bombing attacks in British Columbia and recommended several measures intended to integrate the Doukhobors into Canadian society, notably through the education of their children in public schools. Around that time, the provincial government entered into direct negotiations with the Freedomite leadership. W. A. C. Bennett's Social Credit government, which came to power in 1952, took a harder stance against the "Doukhobor problem." In 1953, 174 children of the Sons of Freedom were forcibly interned by government agents in a residential school in New Denver, British Columbia. Abuse of the interned children was later alleged.

In less than fifty years, the Sons of Freedom committed 1,112 separate acts of violence and arson, costing over $20 million in damages; these acts include bombing and arson attacks on public schools, bombings of Canadian railway bridges and tracks, the bombing of a courthouse at Nelson, and the destruction of a power transmission tower servicing East Kootenay district, resulting in the loss of 1,200 jobs. Many of the independent and community Doukhobors believed the Sons of Freedom's arson and bombings violated the Doukhobor central principle of nonviolence, and that they did not deserve to be called Doukhobors.

=== Doukhobors remaining in Russia ===
After the departure of the more zealous and uncompromising Doukhobors, and many community leaders, to Canada at the close of the Elisabethpol Governorate in the Caucasus Viceroyalty (now Azerbaijan), the former Doukhobor villages became mostly repopulated by Baptists. Elsewhere, some Doukhobors joined nearby Spiritual Christian groups.

Those who remained Doukhobors were required to submit to the state. Few protested against military service; of 837 Russian court-martial cases against conscientious objectors recorded between the beginning of World War I and April 1, 1917, 16 had Doukhobor defendants, none of whom hailed from the Transcaucasian provinces.(page 148) Between 1921 and 1923, Verigin's son Peter P. Verigin arranged the resettlement of 4,000 Doukhobors from the Ninotsminda (Bogdanovka) district in south Georgia to Rostov Oblast in southern Russia, and another 500 into Zaporizhzhia Oblast in Ukraine.

The Soviet reforms greatly affected the lives of the Doukhobors, both in their old villages in Georgia and in the new settlement areas in southern Russian and Ukraine. State anti-religious campaigns resulted in the suppression of Doukhobor religious tradition, and the loss of books and archival records. Many religious leaders were arrested or exiled; for example, 18 people were exiled from Gorelovka in 1930. Communists' imposition of collective farming did not contradict the Doukhobor way of life. Industrious Doukhobors made their collective farms prosperous, often specializing in cheesemaking.

Of the Doukhobor communities in the Soviet Union, those in South Georgia were the most sheltered from outside influence because of their geographic isolation in mountainous terrain, their location near the international border, and concomitant travel restrictions for outsiders.

== Hymnody ==
Doukhobor oral holy hymns, which they call the "Book of Life" (Russian: Zhivotnaya kniga), de facto replaced the written Bible. Their teaching is founded on this tradition. The Book of Life of the Doukhobors (1909) is the first printed hymnal containing songs in the Southern Russian dialect, which were composed to be sung aloud. Their prayer meetings and gatherings are dominated by the singing of a cappella psalms, hymns, and spiritual songs.

== Population ==
In 2001, an estimated 20,000–40,000 people of Doukhobor heritage lived in Canada, 3,800 of whom claimed "Doukhobor" as their religious affiliation. An estimated 30,000 people of Doukhobor heritage live in Russia and neighbouring countries. In 2011, there were 2,290 Canadians who identified their religious affiliation as "Doukhobor"; in Russia there were 50 such persons by the mid-2000s.

=== Canada ===
During the Canada 2011 Census, 2,290 persons in Canada—of whom 1,860 in British Columbia, 200 in Alberta, 185 in Saskatchewan, and 25 in Ontario—identified their religious affiliation as "Doukhobor". The proportion of older people among these self-identified Doukhobors is higher than among the general population.

| Age groups | Total | 0–14 years | 15–24 years | 25–44 years | 45–64 years | 65–84 years | 85 years and over |
|---|---|---|---|---|---|---|---|
| All Canadians, 2001 | 29,639,035 | 5,737,670 | 3,988,200 | 9,047,175 | 7,241,135 | 3,337,435 | 287,415 |
| Self-identified Doukhobors, 2001 | 3,800 | 415 | 345 | 845 | 1,135 | 950 | 110 |
| Self-identified Doukhobors, 1991 | 4,820 | 510 | 510 | 1,125 | 1,400 | 1,175 | 100 |

Twenty-eight percent of the self-identified Doukhobors in 2001 were over 65 (born before 1936), as compared to 12% of the entire population of Canadian respondents. The aging of the denomination is accompanied by its shrinkage, starting in the 1960s:

| Census year | Self-identified Doukhobor population |
|---|---|
| 1921 | 12,674 |
| 1931 | 14,978 |
| 1941 | 16,898 |
| 1951 | 13,175 |
| 1961 | 13,234 |
| 1971 | 9,170 |
| 1981.g., 28% | ? coded as "Doukhobor, Orthodox" and "Doukhobor, Reformed" |
| 1991 | 4,820 |
| 2001 | 3,800 |
| 2011 | 2,290 |
| 2021 | 1,675 |

The number of Canadians with Doukhobor heritage is much higher than the number of those who consider themselves members of this religion. In 2012, Doukhobor researchers estimated there were "over 20,000" people "from [Doukhobor] stock" in Canada and over 40,000 Doukhobors by "a wider definition of religion, ethnicity, way of life, and social movement".

Canadian Doukhobors no longer live communally. Doukhobors do not practice baptism, neither wet nor dry, nor require one to be "born again". They reject several items considered orthodox among Christian churches, including church organization and liturgy, the inspiration of the scriptures, the literal interpretation of resurrection, the literal interpretation of the Trinity, and heaven and hell. Some avoid the use of alcohol, tobacco, and animal products for food, and eschew involvement in partisan politics. Doukhobors believe in the goodness of man and reject the idea of original sin.

=== Georgia and Russia ===
Since the late 1980s, many of the Doukhobors of Georgia started emigrating to Russia. Various groups moved to Tula Oblast, Rostov Oblast, Stavropol Krai, and elsewhere. After the 1991 independence of Georgia, many villages with Russian names received Georgian names; Bogdanovka became Ninotsminda, Troitskoe became Sameba. According to various estimates, in Ninotsminda District, the Doukhobor population fell from around 4,000 in 1979 to between 3,000 and 3,500 in 1989, and around 700 in 2006. In Dmanisi district, it fell from around 700 Doukhobors in 1979 to no more than 50 by the mid-2000s. Most of those who remain in Georgia are older people; the younger generation found it easier to relocate to Russia. The Doukhobor community of Gorelovka in Ninotsminda District, the former "capital" of the Kalmykov family, is thought to be the best-preserved in all former Soviet Union countries.

== Ecumenical relations ==
The Canadian Doukhobors have maintained a close association with Mennonites and Quakers in Canada due to similar religious practices; all of these groups are collectively considered to be peace churches due to their belief in pacifism.

== Historical sites and museums ==
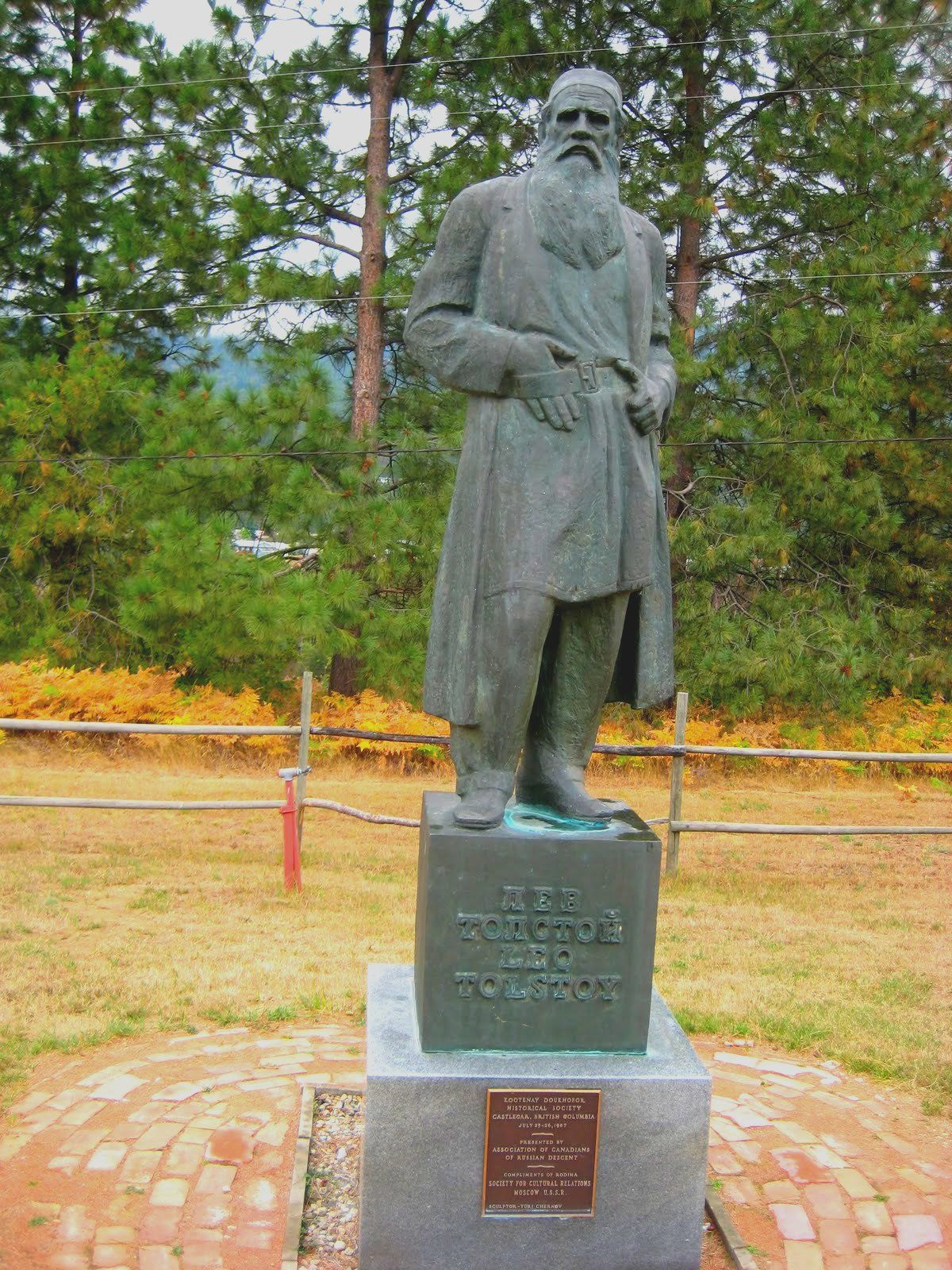
Leo Tolstoy Statue at the Doukhobor Discovery Centre

In 1995, the Doukhobor Suspension Bridge spanning the Kootenay River was designated a National Historic Site of Canada. The site of Community Doukhobors' headquarters in Veregin, Saskatchewan, was designated a National Historic Site in 2006, under the name "Doukhobors at Veregin".

A Doukhobor museum known as the "Doukhobor Discovery Centre" (formerly, "Doukhobor Village Museum") operates in Castlegar, British Columbia. It contains over 1,000 artifacts representing the arts, crafts, and daily lives of the Doukhobors of the Kootenays in 1908–38.

Although most of the early Doukhobor village structures in British Columbia have vanished or been significantly remodelled by later users, a part of Makortoff Village outside Grand Forks, British Columbia has been preserved as a museum by Peter Gritchen, who purchased the property in 1971 and opened it as Mountain View Doukhobor Museum on June 16, 1972. The site's future became uncertain after his death in 2000 but in March 2004, in cooperation with local organizations and concerned citizens, The Land Conservancy of British Columbia purchased the historical site known as Hardy Mountain Doukhobor Village while Boundary Museum Society acquired the museum collection and loaned it to TLC for display.

The Canadian Museum of Civilization in Gatineau has a collection of Doukhobor-related items. A special exhibition there was run in 1998–99 to mark the centennial anniversary of the Doukhobor arrival in Canada.

== Linguistic history and dialect ==
The Doukhobors took with them to Canada a Southern Russian dialect, which in the following decades changed under the influence of Canadian English and the speech of the Ukrainian settlers in Saskatchewan. Over several generations, this dialect has been mostly lost because the modern descendants of the original Doukhobor migrants to Canada are typically native English speakers; when they speak Russian, it is typically a fairly standard variety.

=== Linguistic history ===
In 1802, the Doukhobors and other spiritual Christian tribes were encouraged to migrate to the Molochna River region around Melitopol near Ukraine's Sea of Azov coast, within the Pale of Settlement neighbouring settlements of anabaptists from Germany. Over the next 10 or 20 years, the Doukhobors and others, mostly speaking a variety of Southern Russian dialects, arrived at the Molochna from several provinces, most of which are located in modern-day eastern Ukraine and south-central Russia. In the settlers' villages, an opportunity for the formation of a dialect koiné based on Southern Russian and Eastern Ukrainian dialects arose.

Starting in 1841, the Doukhobors and others were resettled from southern Ukraine to Transcaucasia, where they founded several villages surrounded by mostly non-Russian speaking neighbours—primarily Azerbaijanis in Elisabethpol Governorate, Armenians in Tiflis Governorate, and likely a mix of both in the later post-1878 settlements in Kars Oblast. These conditions allowed the dialect to develop in comparative isolation from mainstream Russian.

With the migration of 7,500 Doukhbors from Transcaucasia to Saskatchewan in 1899, and some smaller latecomer groups from both Transcaucasia and from places of exile in Siberia and elsewhere, the dialect spoken in the Doukhobor villages of Transcaucasia was taken to the plains of Canada. From that point, it experienced influence from Canadian English and, during the years of Doukhobor stay in Saskatchewan, the speech of their Ukrainian neighbours.

A split in the Doukhobor community resulted in a large number of Doukhobors moving from Saskatchewan to south-eastern British Columbia around 1910. Those who moved, the so-called Community Doukhobors — followers of Peter Verigin's Christian Community of Universal Brotherhood (CCUB) — continued living communally for several decades, and had a better chance to preserve their Russian language than the Independent Doukhobors, who stayed in Saskatchewan as individual farmers.

By the 1970s, as most Russian-born members of the community died, English became the first language of the great majority of Canadian Doukhobors. Their English speech is not noticeably different from that of other English-speaking Canadians of their provinces. Russian still remains in use, at least for religious purposes, among those who practice the Doukhobor religion.

=== Features of the Doukhobor Russian dialect in Canada ===
Research into the Russian spoken by Canada's Doukhobors has not been extensive but several articles, mostly published in the 1960s and 1970s, noted a variety of features in Doukhobors' Russian speech that were characteristic of Southern, and in some cases Central Russian dialects; for example, use of the Southern [h] where Standard Russian has [g].

Features characteristic of many locales in the East Slavic language space were noted, reflecting the heterogeneous origin of the Doukhobors' settlements in Molochna River after 1800; for example, like Belarusians, Doukhobor speakers do not palatalize [r] in "редко" (redko, 'seldom'). Remarkable was the dropping of the final -t in the third-person singular form of verbs, which can be considered a Ukrainian feature and is also attested in some Russian dialects spoken in Southern Ukraine (e.g., Nikolaev near the Doukhobors' former homeland on the Molochna). As with other immigrant groups, the Russian speech of the Doukhobors uses English loanwords for some concepts they had not encountered until moving to Canada.

== In popular culture ==
- Russel, Eric Frank (1962), The Great Explosion, United States: Dodd, Mead and Company, p. 187 A 1962 Eric Frank Russell science-fiction novel, The Great Explosion, adapted and expanded from his 1951 novella "...And Then There Were None", mentions the Doukhobors as a group of interstellar settlers on the planet Hygeia who had been marginalized by later naturist settlers.
- Roy, Gabrielle (1975), "Hoodoo Valley", Garden in the wind (novel), McClelland & Stewart, pp. 107+, ISBN 978-0-7710-7834-7.
- Heinlein, Robert A. (March 1952), H. L. Gold (ed.), "The Year of the Jackpot", Galaxy Magazine : Science Fiction, vol. 3, no. 6, p. 10 — A short story that falsely mentions nudists as: "those people up in Canada. Dooka-somethings. Doukhobors."
- O'Neail, Hazel (1962), Doukhobor Daze, Gray's, Evergreen — Humorous memoir of young school teacher of Doukhobor kids in rural Brilliant, B.C., with antics and transliteration of their English dialect.
- Plotnikoff, Vi (2001). Head Cook at Weddings and Funerals, And Other Stories of Doukhobor Life (novel). Raincoast Books..
- Stenson, Bill (2007). Svoboda (novel). Thistledown Press. ISBN 978-1-897235-30-0.. — Review with lesson plan for teachers.

=== Drama ===
- Doukhobors (1971). Collective creation at Theatre Passe Muraille.

=== Non-fiction ===
- Hawthorn, Harry B (1955), The Doukhobors of British Columbia
- Marsden, Philip (1998), The Spirit Wrestlers: A Russian Odyssey, HarperCollins.
- Tarasoff, Koozma J. (2002), Spirit Wrestlers: Doukhobor Pioneers' Strategies for Living, Legas.
- Woodcock, George; Avakumovic, Ivan (1977), The Doukhobors, Carleton University Institute of Canadian Studies, McClelland & Stewart.
- Wright, James; Wright, Frederic Church (1940), Slava Bohu, Farrar & Rinehart Inc.

=== Music ===
- Reynolds, Malvina (1962), "Do As the Doukhobors Do", The Best of Broadside 1962–88 (originally The Doukhobor Do) is about the Doukhobor nude protests. The song was recorded by Pete Seeger.
- In the bonus track "Ferdinand the Imposter" on the 2000 re-issue of Music from Big Pink by the Canadian roots-rock group The Band, the title character "claimed he was a Doukhobor" after being arrested. The implication in the lyrics is that Ferdinand may have been apprehended for some public display of nudity in Baltimore, Maryland. He attempted to escape punishment by stating he came from the Doukhobors of Canada. Unfortunately for Ferdinand, the American officers were unfamiliar with the group and were unmoved by Ferdinand's plea.

=== Television ===
- Woodcock, George (1976), The Doukhobors (film), CBC/NFB. Two parts: The Living Book and Toil and Peaceful Life.

== See also ==
- Pneumatomachi
- Spiritual Christians

== Bibliography ==
- Androsoff, Ashleigh. "The Trouble with Teamwork: Doukhobor Women’s Plow Pulling in Western Canada, 1899". Canadian Historical Review 2019 100:4, 540-563.
- Bartolf, Christian / Dominique Miething: "Flame of Truth": the global significance of Doukhobor Pacifism. Russian Journal of Church History, Vol. 4, No. 4 (Special Issue: History of Christian Peacemaking and Pacifism, Editor: Dr. Nadezhda Beliakova) (2023): 6-27. PDF
- Chertkov, Vladimir (1911). "Doukhobors" . In Chisholm, Hugh (ed.). Encyclopædia Britannica (11th ed.). Cambridge University Press. pp. 448–49.
- Elkinton, Joseph, The Doukhobors: their history in Russia; their migration to Canada.
- Friesen, John W.; Verigin, Michael M. (1996) [1986], The Community Doukhobors: A People in Transition (2nd ed.), Ontario: Borealis Press, ISBN 0-88887-151-1.
- Hamm, James 'Jim' (2002), Spirit Wrestlers (documentary video) about the Freedomite Doukhobors.
- Hawthorn, Harry B, The Doukhobors of British Columbia.
- Holt, Simma. Terror in the Name of God The Story of the Sons of Freedom Doukhobors (McClelland and Stewart, 1964)
- Peacock, Kenneth, ed. (1970), Songs of the Doukhobors: An Introductory Outline, National Museums of Canada Bulletin No. 231, Folklore Series No. 7, translated by E. A. Popoff (song texts), Ottawa: The National Museums of Canada; Queen's Printer of Canada, archived from the original (PDF) on April 5, 2023
- Tarasoff, Koozma J. (1999). "Doukbhobors". In Paul Robert Magocsi (ed.). Encyclopedia of Canada's Peoples. University of Toronto Press. pp. 422–34. ISBN 978-0-8020-2938-6.
- Tarasoff, Koozma J, Plakun Trava: The Doukhobors
- Tarasoff, Koozma J. (2006), "Overview", Spirit Wrestlers: Doukhobor Pioneers' Strategies for Living, Ottawa: Legas, ISBN 1-896031-12-9.
- Tarasoff, Koozma J.; Klymasz, Robert B. (1995), Spirit Wrestlers: centennial papers in honour of Canada's Doukhobor Heritage, Canadian Museum of Civilization, ISBN 0-660-14034-9.
- Thorsteinson, Elina (1917). "The Doukhobors in Canada" (PDF). Mississippi Valley Historical Review. 4 (1): 3–48. doi:10.2307/1886809. JSTOR 1886809.
- Woodcock, George; Avakumovic, Ivan, The Doukhobors.
- Makarova V. (2012). The use of Russian in contemporary Doukhobor prayer service. In: International scientific research Internet conference "Current issues in philology and methods of teaching foreign languages", February 1–29, 2012, Novosibirsk, Russia. Международнaя научно-практическая Интернет-конференция «Актуальные проблемы филологии и методики преподавания иностранных языков», 1 февраля - 29 февраля 2012 года; http://ffl.nspu.net/?p=144
- Makarova V. A., Usenkova, E.V., Evdokimova, V.V. Evgrafova, K. V. (2011). The Language of Saskatchewan Doukhobors: Introduction to analysis. Izvestija Vysshix uchebnyx zavedenij [The News of Higher Schools]. Serija Gumanitarnyje nauki [Humanities]. Razdel Lingvistika [Linguistics section]. Vol 2 (2), pp. 146–151. http://www.isuct.ru/e-publ/gum/ru/2011/t02n02/philology-and-linguistics
- Schaarschmidt Gunter (University of Victoria, Canada) Four norms – one culture: Doukhobor Russian in Canada
- Schaarschmidt, G. (2012). Russian language history in Canada. Doukhobor internal and external migrations: effects on language development and structure. In: V. Makarova (Ed), Russian Language Studies in North America: the New Perspectives from Theoretical and Applied Linguistics. London/New York: Anthem Press. pp. 235–260. www.anthempress.com
