= Christian Community of Universal Brotherhood =

Christian Community of Universal Brotherhood (CCUB) (Russian: Христианская Община Всемирного Братства) was the main spiritual and economic organization of the majority of Doukhobors from Russia in Canada, followers of Peter V. Verigin, from its incorporation in 1917 until its bankruptcy in 1938. In its corporate form, it was an instrument that allowed its members, known as Community Doukhobors, to have a form of collective ownership of the lands that they lived and worked on, as well as of agricultural and industrial facilities.

== History of the name ==
The name of the Christians of the Universal Brotherhood was used by the Doukhobors to describe themselves even before they left Russian Empire in 1899. It appears, for example, in Leo Tolstoy's article The Emigration of the Doukhobors (April 1898). The name was inspired to Peter V. Verigin from the name of the Brotherhood Church, England, associated with the Tolstoyan movement, after John C. Kenworthy corresponded with him. Verigin explained to his followers in an 1896 letter: "The name 'Doukhobor' is not understood by outsiders ... yet the name 'Christian Community of Universal Brotherhood' will tell more clearly that we look on all men as our brothers, according to the command of the Lord Jesus Christ. ... '

Once in Canada, the Doukhobor immigrants started to use the name of The Christian Community of Universal Brotherhood to identify themselves as a group even before the group leader Peter Verigin joined them in the late 1902.

Throughout the years, the name appeared to be attached to the overall social and economic organization of the Community Doukhobors (i.e., those who owned land and other means of production as a community). It became the official name of the organization when it was officially incorporated on March 25, 1917, and remained in use until its bankruptcy in 1937 and the following liquidation.

== First attempts at communal economy in Saskatchewan (1898–1907) ==
When several thousand Doukhobors refugees arrived to Saskatchewan from Russian Transcaucasian provinces in 1899, the largely agricultural community was faced with deciding what form of settlement, land ownership, and overall economic organization they would choose for their new community. At one end of the range of possibilities, the settlers could become individual homesteaders, each family living on and farming its allotment of 160 acres (0.65 km^{2}), as envisioned in Dominion Lands Act and encouraged by the Canadian authorities. At the other end of the range, people could live in multi-family villages, collectively owning their amalgamated land grants and other resources, and just as collectively working on them and owning the fruits of their work, as was later practiced in kibbutzim. There were, of course, also many intermediate options - as, e.g. in a typical 19th century Russian peasant community, where land was owned collectively, but partitioned (and regularly repartitioned) among families for individual farming.

While the option of individual ownership appealed to wealthier Doukhobors, and was very much encouraged by the authorities, the majority of the Doukhobor settlers, including their elders, expected to live in villages (according to the Russian tradition, which even later Stolypin reform could not successfully destroy) and to own the land collectively, in accordance with the Doukhobor religious belief. On the practical level, whatever their private beliefs, most of the poorer members of the community simply could not afford to strike out on their own, and would follow the communal-minded leaders.

Thus in practice most of the early Doukhobor economic activity was communal; the earnings of the members were pooled together, and the expenses of each member were paid out of the community budget. In the annual reports of Doukhobor annual meetings discussing these income and expenses, the name of The Christian Community of Universal Brotherhood was used to designate the overall organization. In the early years (1904, 1906 (Doukhobor Genealogy Website)), these meetings took place in the now-defunct village of Nadezhda, some 10 km of Veregin, Saskatchewan. In May 1906, The New York Times reported of "the first general meeting of the Doukhobor Trading Company", in the same village of Nadezhda. In accordance with the Doukhobor philosophy, the meeting took care not only of the community financial affairs, but also of animal welfare.

The forms of land ownership remained a thorny issue. Against the background of the government requiring the Doukhobors to register individual ownership of land as per the Dominion Lands Act, and the majority of the Doukhobors refusing to do so, their charismatic leader, Peter Vasilevich Verigin, who fortuitously arrived from Siberian exile in the late 1902, proposed a seemingly satisfactory solution in early 1903: asking his followers to register individual ownership, while still in fact owning the resources and working in the land in common.

However, this compromise was not to be long lasting. On the one hand, some zealots in the Doukhobor community felt that even registration "as a formality only" was against their principles. On the other hand, as Anglos' demand for Saskatchewan land increased, Frank Oliver replaced Clifford Sifton as the Minister of the Interior, the authorities attitude toward Doukhobors become increasingly uncompromising. Soon after assuming office (1905), Frank Oliver demanded that, in order to keep their land, the Doukhobors naturalize as British subjects, swearing the Oath of Allegiance to the Crown. As one of their religious conviction was that one does not swear allegiance to anyone but God, this would be an insurmountable obstacle for many. Toward 1906, the authorities would also start to enforce the Dominion Lands Act rule that the homesteaders actually lived on their individual lots or (as per the "Hamlet Clause") at a village (hamlet) no more than 3 miles (4.8 km) away from their land.

== Migration to British Columbia and Peter V. Verigin's incorporation of CCUB (1908–1924) ==
The result of the conflict between the communitarian ideals of Verigin's Doukhobors and the policies of the Canadian authorities was that, while the "Independent" Doukhobors (those who had chosen to abide by the individual ownership rules and to naturalize) prospered, the "Community Doukhobors" lost much of their land by 1907. Verigin solution to this catastrophe was to privately buy land in British Columbia in his own name, and resettle his followers there, in communal villages of their liking. This would obviate both Dominion Lands Act issues (the "village vs. individual homestead" issue and the Oath of Allegiance issue), just like the Hutterites' private purchase of land had done for Hutterites.

Verigin's migration plan was accomplished during several years starting in 1908. A British Columbia Royal Commission report from 1912, describes the social and economic organization of some 5,000 Doukhobors that had arrived to the province at the time in the following way:

The books of the Community are well kept; there is a ledger account for every individual, showing the contribution to the Central Fund, and a ledger account for each village, showing its dealings with the Central Fund. The Central Fund is administered under the direction of Verigin and the management of Michael Cazakoff for the benefits of the whole Community, and really represents the Communal Fund. The village property, following the tradition custom of the Russian Mir, belongs to each individual village and is managed by a village committee. The relation between the villages and the Central Fund is maintained by an annual levy, which at present stands at $200 per annum for each man. From this Central Fund all Community lands have been purchased, and by its means the exodus of the Doukhobors to British Columbia and their establishment in their new home there was financed.

The same report quotes correspondence from the "Doukhobor Community located around Nelson and Grand Forks" dated July 1912, in which the community is referred to as "The Christian Community of Universal Brotherhood Doukhobors in Canada".

In 1917, the Doukhobor communities were incorporated as Christian Community of Universal Brotherhood, and the ownership of lands purchased by Verigin was transferred to this organization. CCUB Inc. included some land occupied and managed by Independent Doukhobors who were not "followers" of Verigin.

For the next decade, the organization continued to be a commercial success, owning and productively operating agricultural, forestry, and industrial enterprises.

== After the death of P. V. Verigin ==
The death of Peter V. Verigin in October 1924 brought about a leadership crisis.

Attempts of Verigin's widow, Anastasia F. Golubova (1885–1965) Russian: Анастасия Ф. Голубова[-Божья]; often spelled in English as Holuboff), who had been Verigin's common-law wife for some 20 years, to lead the community, were supported by only a few hundreds Doukhobors, who in 1926 split from CCUB, forming a breakaway organization called "The Lordly Christian Community of Christian Brotherhood" (Russian: Господняя Христианская Община Всемирного Братства). They left British Columbia for Alberta, where the set up their own village, called Anastasyino (Анастасьино) between Arrowwood and Shouldice, which existed until 1943. These days, only a cemetery 5 miles east of Arrowhead (map) reminds us of the existence of this community, with the sign "Christian Community of Universal Brotherhood."

In the meantime, Peter P. Verigin arrived from the USSR and assumed the leadership of CCUB in 1928.

== Bankruptcy ==
In 1938 the CCUB was forced into bankruptcy by the banks, Peter P. Verigin reorganized and renamed the organization of Community Doukhobors as the "Union of Spiritual Communities of Christ" (USCC). Unlike the CCUB, this organization had no major economic functions, and only provided spiritual and cultural leadership to its members. It continues in this role to this day.
