= Gədəbəy =

Gadabay Gədəbəy
- City & Municipality
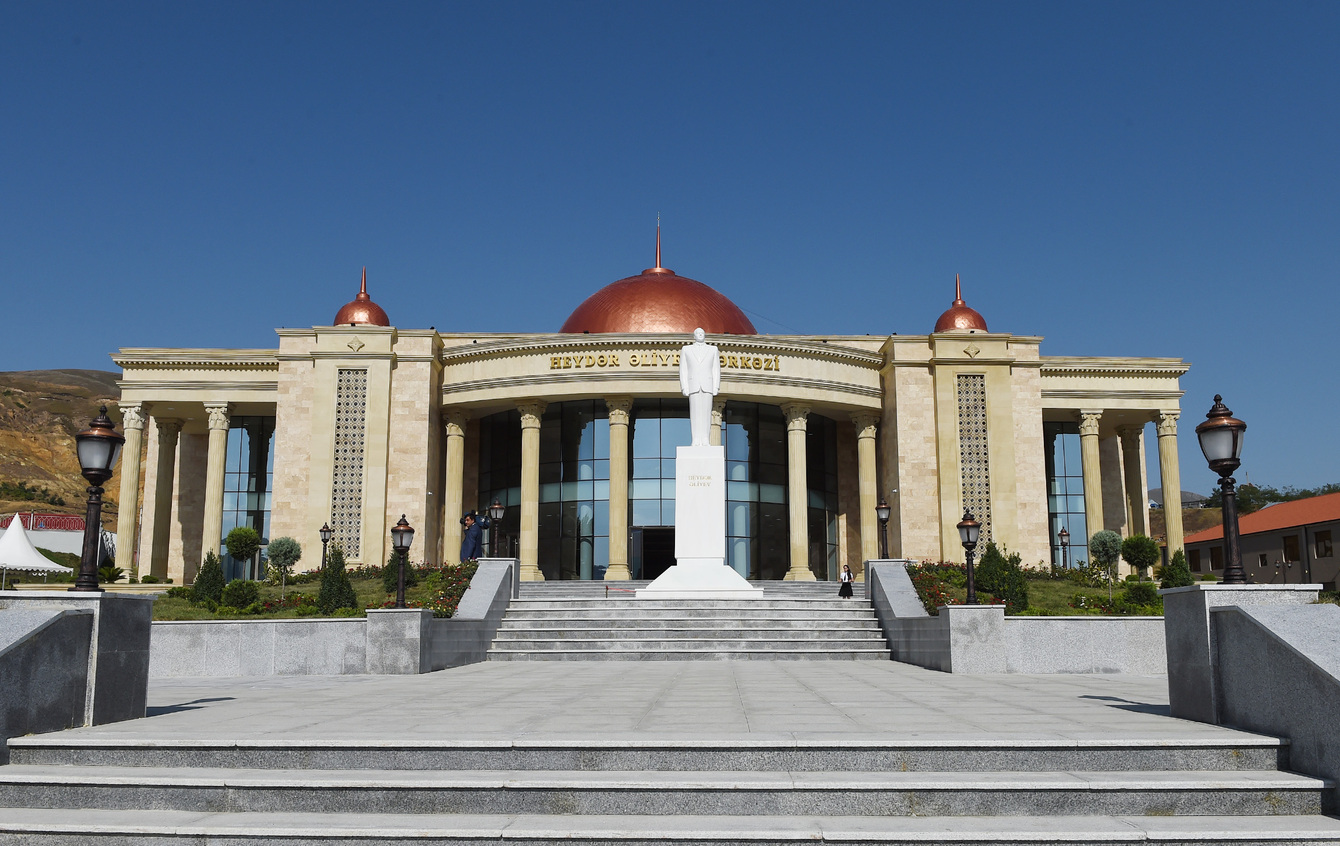

- Location within Azerbaijan
- Coordinates: 40°33′56″N 45°48′58″E
- Country: Azerbaijan
- District: Gadabay
- Elevation: 1,467 m (4,813 ft)

Population (2010)
  - Total: 9,161
- Time zone: UTC+4 (AZT)
- Area code: +994 232

Gadabay (Azerbaijani: Gədəbəy) is a city and the administrative center of the Gadabay District of Azerbaijan. It is located 444 km (275.89 mi) away from Baku, the capital of Azerbaijan.

== Name ==
The ancient name of Gadabay was Getabak (Armenian: Գետաբեկ, romanized: Getabek, Russian: Kedabek). Vardan Areveltsi, a historian from the 13th century, mentions the toponym in the plural form Getabakkʻ. German scientist Heinrich Hübschmann hypothesized the toponym comes from Armenian, and composes from two words get (գետ, "river") and bak (բակ, "yard").

== History ==
In the 19th century, tombs dating to the Bronze and Iron Ages were found in the settlement. Getabak was the name of a fortress mentioned in Armenian sources as early as the 7th century, apparently to be distinguished from the village of the same name which later became Gadabay. The village of Getabak was devastated in the 1770s and remained abandoned until the 1860s, when around twenty Armenian families from the Kazakh Uyezd founded two villages on the site of the abandoned village: Hin Getabak ("Old Getabak") in the west, and Hayi Getabak ("Armenian Getabak" also known as Ghazakh, Ghazakhli or Ghazakhashen) in the north.

Armenian sources suggest that the settlement had a significant Armenian minority or even plurality; ultimately, not much census information prior to Soviet times is available. It was the site of clashes during the Armenian–Tatar massacres of 1905–1907, as a result of which Hayi Getabak was razed.

In the middle of the 19th century, copper ore deposits were discovered in the region and a copper plant was built by local entrepreneurs in 1855–1856. Later, this plant was purchased by the London-based company Siemens Brothers and rebuilt in 1865. The Galakend copper plant was built by Siemens in 1883 and 1879. The Trans-Caucasus gas pipeline of 28 km was constructed between Gadabay and Galakend. There were 4 locomotives and 33 wagons on this railroad. In 1883, the first hydroelectric power plant was built in the village of Galakend in the territory of Tsarist Russia and copper was melted by electrolysis in Galakend copper plant. After the copper ore was exhausted, Siemens shifted to the extraction of sulfur ore. Gadabay became significantly polluted as a result of the mining operations.

An Orthodox church built by the Georgian monk Ilarion Jashi in Gadabay (then Kedabek), together with a chapel in Slavyanka village, served as a Christian center of the Georgian Exarchate of the Russian Church during the 19th century.

According to the 1989 census, about 5000 people lived in Gadabay. It received its city status in the same year.

== Demographics ==
The population of the city was 9,161 at the time of the 2010 census.. The city has 11,700 residents according to the 2020 census.

== Geography and climate ==
Gadabay lies at the northern foot of the Shahdagh Range, at an altitude of 1460 meters, on the coast of the Mis River. The city is located in the middle and high mountainous areas of the Lesser Caucasus (also called Little Caucasus).

Climate data for Gadabay, Azerbaijan (1973-2017)
Month	Jan	Feb	Mar	Apr	May	Jun	Jul	Aug	Sep	Oct	Nov	Dec	Year
Record high °C (°F)	17.5 (63.5)	17.0 (62.6)	22.0 (71.6)	27.0 (80.6)	29.0 (84.2)	34.5 (94.1)	36.0 (96.8)	37.0 (98.6)	33.6 (92.5)	28.5 (83.3)	23.3 (73.9)	21.0 (69.8)	37.0 (98.6)
Mean daily maximum °C (°F)	4.8 (40.6)	5.0 (41.0)	9.2 (48.6)	13.8 (56.8)	19.0 (66.2)	22.6 (72.7)	25.1 (77.2)	25.9 (78.6)	21.4 (70.5)	15.4 (59.7)	10.8 (51.4)	5.8 (42.4)	14.9 (58.8)
Daily mean °C (°F)	−0.4 (31.3)	−0.4 (31.3)	4.0 (39.2)	8.2 (46.8)	13.5 (56.3)	16.8 (62.2)	19.5 (67.1)	19.8 (67.6)	15.8 (60.4)	10.3 (50.5)	5.6 (42.1)	0.7 (33.3)	9.5 (49.0)
Mean daily minimum °C (°F)	−5.5 (22.1)	−5.9 (21.4)	−1.2 (29.8)	2.7 (36.9)	7.9 (46.2)	11.1 (52.0)	13.9 (57.0)	13.7 (56.7)	10.3 (50.5)	5.2 (41.4)	0.5 (32.9)	−4.4 (24.1)	4.0 (39.2)
Record low °C (°F)	−18.0 (−0.4)	−20.0 (−4.0)	−13.6 (7.5)	−11.0 (12.2)	0.7 (33.3)	1.9 (35.4)	6.2 (43.2)	7.0 (44.6)	0.9 (33.6)	−4.6 (23.7)	−9.8 (14.4)	−14.0 (6.8)	−20.0 (−4.0)
Average precipitation mm (inches)	22.5 (0.89)	30.4 (1.20)	23.2 (0.91)	31.2 (1.23)	50.6 (1.99)	47.7 (1.88)	42.5 (1.67)	22.2 (0.87)	29.4 (1.16)	74.2 (2.92)	20.6 (0.81)	11.1 (0.44)	405.5 (15.96)
Average precipitation days (≥ 1.0 mm)	5.3	4.7	6.7	8.1	9.9	8.4	4.2	4.4	5.0	7.3	5.3	3.8	72.9
Source: NOAA

== Notable natives ==
- Grikor Suni (1876–1939), prominent Armenian composer
- Victor Oehrn (1907–1997), was a Fregattenkapitän with the Kriegsmarine during World War II.

== Twin towns – sister cities ==
- Stillwater, United States
