= Peter Verigin =

Russian philosopher (1859–1924)

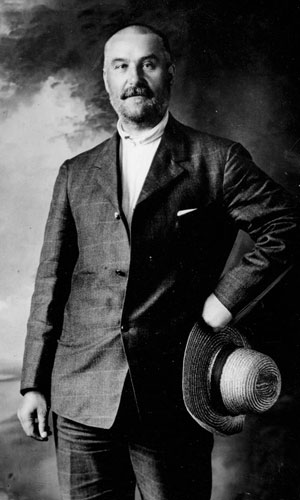
- Born: Peter Vasilevich Verigin; 12 July 1859; Slavyanka, Russian Empire
- Died: 29 October 1924 (aged 65); Kettle Valley Railway, British Columbia, Canada
- Cause of death: Killed by a bomb explosion while traveling on Canadian Pacific Railway
- Resting place: Brilliant, British Columbia (near Castlegar)
- Occupation: Spiritual leader of the Community Doukhobors
- Term: 1887-1924
- Predecessor: Lukerya Vasilyevna Kalmykova (née Gubanova)
- Successor: Peter Petrovich Verigin
- Spouse(s): (1) Evdokia Georgievna Verigina (née Kotelnikova); (2) Anastasia F. Golubova (also spelt Holuboff) (1885-1965)
- Children: Peter Petrovich Verigin
- Parent(s): Vasily Verigin and Anastasia V. Verigina (1817-1905)

Peter Vasilevich Verigin (Russian: Пётр Васильевич Веригин) often known as Peter "the Lordly" Verigin (12 July [O.S. 30 June] 1859 – 29 October 1924), was a Russian philosopher, activist, and leader of the Community Doukhobors in Canada. The perpetrators of his assassination in 1924 have never been identified.

Not to be confused with his son Peter P. Verigin.

== Biography ==
=== In Transcaucasia ===
Peter Vasilevich Verigin was born on 11 July [O.S. 29 June] 1859 in the village of Slavyanka in Elisabethpol Governorate of Russian Empire. The village, located in the north-west of what is today the Republic of Azerbaijan, was one of the settlements founded by the Doukhobors, a large sect of communally living peasants, exiled to the Transcaucasia from Ukraine and southern Russia in the 1840s. His father, Vasily Verigin, was an illiterate, but reportedly rich peasant, who, once elected a village headman, "showed himself a real despot".

11 July [O.S. 29 June] 1859 is the Feast of Saints Peter and Paul. Although the Doukhobors do not traditionally venerate saints, this day is known as St. Peter's Day (Russian: Петров день) is still a traditional day of celebration. It is possible that Verigin was named after St. Peter.

Peter was one of seven brothers. Peter and two other brothers, Vasily and Grigory, were home-schooled, at least to the extent of learning to read and write. There were no formal schools in Doukhobor villages at the time, and his four older brothers did not study.

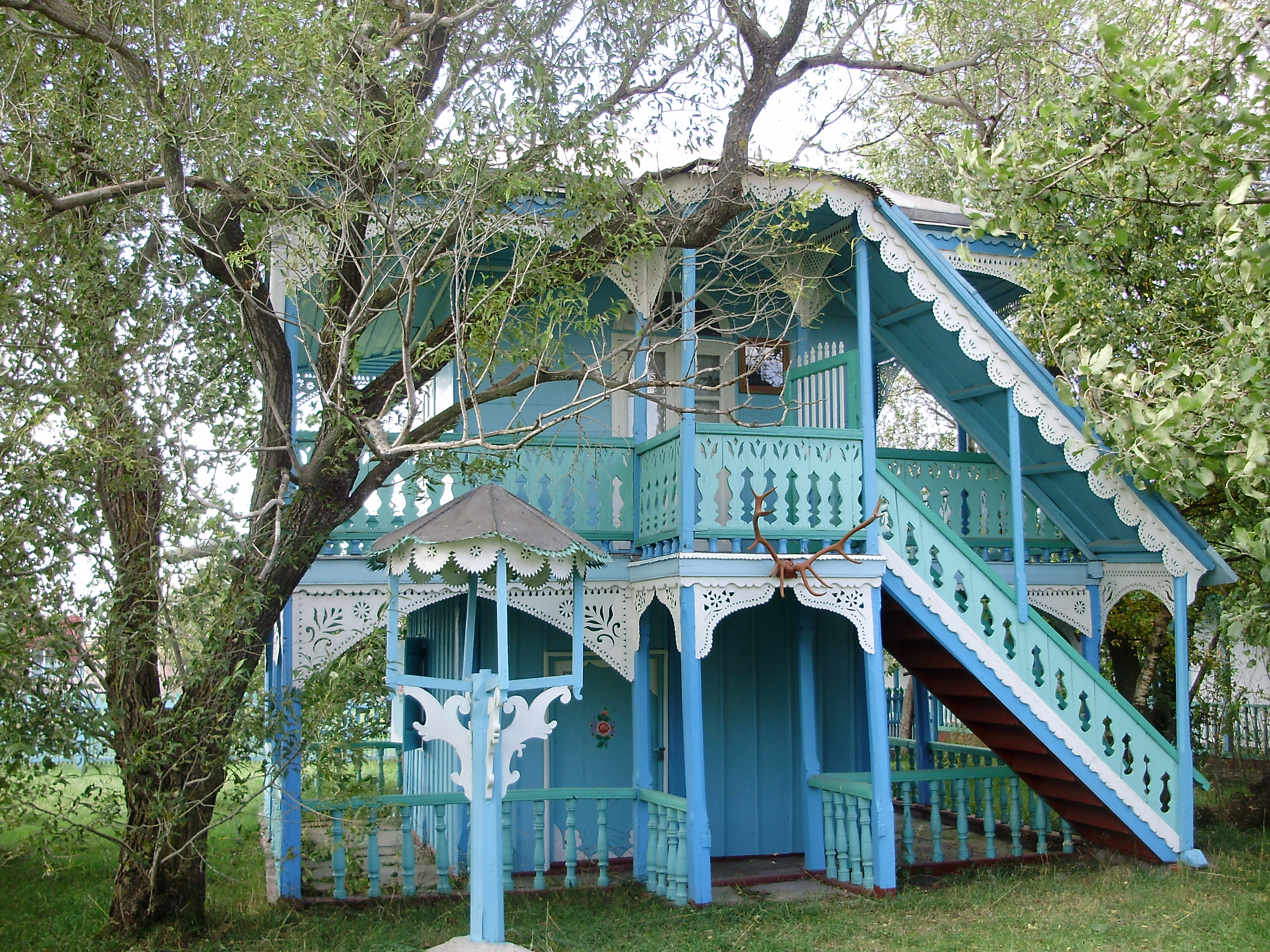
"The Orphanage"

In his early 20s, Peter Verigin married Evdokia Georgievna Kotelnikova. In 1882, soon after his marriage, his wife was expecting their first child (Peter P. Verigin), and Verigin started working as a secretary and administrative assistant for the leader of the Transcaucasian Doukhobors, Lukerya Vasilyevna Gubanova (born 18??; died 15 December 1886: Russian: Лукерья Васильевна Губанова). Lukerya Gubanova was the widow of the community's previous leader, Peter Kalmykov, and was also known as Kalmykova, by her late husband's surname.

The Kalmykov family resided in the village of Gorelovka, one of Doukhobor communities in Georgia (shown on one of J.J. Kalmakoff's maps.), in the Sirotsky Dom (Russian: Сиротский дом), or "The Orphanage" - the facility serving as the Doukhobor headquarter and a home for orphans and the aged. Lukerya was respected by the provincial authorities, who cooperated with the Doukhobors on various matters. While working for her and living at her residence, Verigin received an extensive religious education, and was prepared by the childless Lukerya to become her successor as the leader of the Doukhobors. He became acquainted with the Doukhobor ideas of administration which rejects secular government. The Doukhobors also rejected the holiness of Jesus Christ and the Bible, and were naturally pacifists and conscientious objectors who refused to participate in wars and battles.

The death of Lukerya in 1886 was followed by a leadership crisis. A portion of the community known as "the Large Party" (Russian: Большая сторона) accepted Peter Verigin as her designated successor and leader. Others, known as "the Small Party" (Малая сторона), sided with Lukerya's brother, Michael Gubanov, and the village elder Aleksei Zubkov. While the Large Party was in the majority, the Small Party had the support of the older members of the community and the local authorities.

On 26 January 1887, at the community service where the new leader was to be acclaimed, the police entered and took Verigin away. He was to spend the next 16 years in government custody. The Large Party Doukhobors maintained contact, and continued to consider him their spiritual leader.

=== Northern exile ===
Verigin was first sent to Shenkursk, in Arkhangelsk Governorate (now Arkhangelsk Oblast), in the Russia's north, arriving in October 1887. In the summer 1890, he was transferred to Kola, on the Barents Sea. At that time Kola was Russia's northernmost town, as Murmansk and Polyarny were not yet built. In November 1894, he left Kola for Obdorsk, now Salekhard, in north-western Siberia.

In Shenkursk, Verigin and several exiled Doukhobor elders, shared two houses. When this small band of Doukhobor exiles was visited by Peter Verigin's brother, Grigory, in September 1888, he was impressed with their complete vegetarianism, as Grigory's family in South Caucasus was still eating meat.

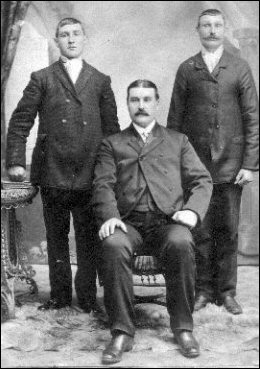
Veregin in 1903 with two of the Doukhobors

In November 1894, as he was being transferred from Kola to Obdorsk, Verigin wrote a message to the Doukhobors, asking them to obey God's commandment, "Thou shalt not kill", to destroy their weapons, and refuse military service. His message was taken to the Caucasus by his brothers Grigory and Vasily, who spread it throughout the Doukhobor communities. Soon, the confrontation between pro-Verigin Pacifist Doukhobors ("the Large Party") and the government drafting their youth came to head. On Easter Sunday 1895, eleven Doukhobor conscripts refused to do military training. In following days more conscripts laid down their arms and refused further service, and reservists were returning their registration papers to the draft boards. Finally, on the night of 28–29 June (10–11 July New Style) 1895, the night before St. Peter's Day (Verigin's birthday), the Large-Party Doukhobors of Transcaucasia assembled in three villages to burn the weapons they owned, commemorated since as "the Burning of the Arms".

Arrests and beatings by government Cossacks followed. Soon, Cossacks were billeted in many of the Doukhobors' houses, with the original inhabitants dispersed through remote villages in the region.

=== The exodus ===
Horrified at the plight of his followers, in August 1896 Verigin wrote to Empress Alexandra Fyodorovna, the wife of Nicholas, making a number of proposals to resolve the conflict, such as the resettlement of the Large-Party Doukhobors to some remote province of Russia (assuming that an exemption from military service could still be granted), or emigration to Britain or Canada. Leo Tolstoy and his associates addressed Russian and international public with letters and articles about the persecution of the Doukhobors.

In 1898, an agreement was reached with the Czar's Minister of the Interior, Ivan Nikolayevich Durnovo, to allow the Doukhobors to leave for Canada. Between 1898 and 1899 around 7,500 Doukhobors from Transcaucasia did so. Of them, some 3,300 were the members of the Large Party; the rest belonged to the Small and the Middle Parties. Among them was Verigin's mother, Anastasia Verigina, around 80 years of age at the time. Smaller numbers of Doukhobors, directly from Transcaucasia or from various places of exile, continued moving to Canada in the years to follow.

In autumn 1902, after 16 years in exile, Verigin was released from Obdorsk. He visited Leo Tolstoy in October, and joined his people in Yorkton (present-day Saskatchewan) in December 1902.

Verigin was to visit Russia again, only once. He came in 1906, leading a delegation of six Doukhobors, to investigate a possibility of the return of the Doukhobors to Russia, now that, as a result of Russian Revolution (1905), religious tolerance has been legislated. Verigin's delegation met with Stolypin and other ministers, who made an offer of land in the Altai (south-western Siberia) and an exemption from the conscription. Although the offer was personally confirmed by Nicholas II, Verigin felt that, no matter what, the Doukhobors' situation in Russia would not be as secure as in Canada. In March 1907 his delegation went back to Canada.

=== In Canada ===
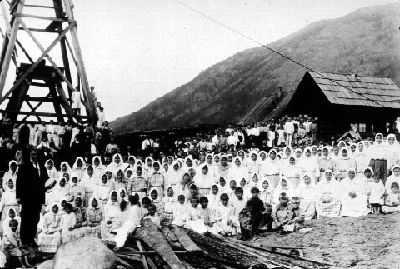
Verigin preaching amongst his followers in 1923 in British Columbia

Verigin established his first Canadian residence at the Doukhobor village of Poterpevshie (Russian: Потерпевшие, 'The Victims', or perhaps 'The Survivors'), some 15 km northwest of Kamsack, Saskatchewan. On the joyful occasion of reuniting with their leader, the villagers renamed the place Otradnoye (Russian: Отрадное, 'the place of rejoicing'). Otradnoye continued to be Verigin's headquarters until 1904 or 1905 The nearby village of Nadezhda was the site of annual general meetings of the Doukhobor community chaired by him.

When the new Canadian Northern Railway line crossed the Doukhobor reserve in 1904 some 10 km south of Otradnoye, a small station named after the Doukhobor leader (misspelled, initially, "Veregin Siding", and after 1908, Veregin Station) was built there around 1904 to serve the needs of the Doukhobor community of the area. A village, also named Veregin (sometimes spelled Verigin, at least on Verigin's own CCUB letterhead) was built next to the station, and Veregin's headquarters was shifted there.

In 1905, the exiled Doukhobors rejected the newly enforced requirements of the federal Dominion Lands Act, which attempted to register their communal lands under individual ownership and rebelled against the request. Following this in 1907 the communal land system was abolished and in 1908 Verigin led around 6,000 of his group (Christian Community of Universal Brotherhood, CCUB) to British Columbia. CCUB still continued to own some properties and industrial facilities in Saskatchewan, and its headquarters remained in Veregin for some years to come. Verigin had another residence built for himself near Grand Forks, British Columbia, spending the rest of his life sharing his time between the two provinces.

== Peter V. Verigin's death ==
Peter V. Verigin (age 65) was killed in a still-unsolved Canadian Pacific Railway train explosion on 29 October 1924, on the Kettle Valley Railway (now known locally as the Columbia and Western Railway) line near Farron, between Castlegar and Grand Forks, which also killed his 17-year-old secretary Marie Strelaeff, member of the provincial legislature John McKie, P.J. Campbell, Hakim Singh, Harry J. Bishop, W. J. Armstrong, and Neil E. Armstrong. The government initially (during investigation) had stated the crime was perpetrated by zealot "Sons of Freedom", while some CCUB Doukhobors suspected Canadian government involvement, or the American KKK. To date, it is still unknown who was responsible for the bombing.

Verigin's grave is located near Brilliant, a historical community Doukhobor village outside Castlegar, British Columbia.

== Successors ==
After Peter V. Verigin's death in 1924, the majority of the community Doukhobors proclaimed his son Peter P. Verigin (P.P. Verigin), who was still in the USSR, as his successor. However, several hundred Community Doukhobors recognized P. V. Verigin's widow, Anastasia F. Golubova (1885–1965; also spelt Holuboff), who had been Verigin's wife for some 20 years, as their leader.

In 1926 Anastasia's followers split from the CCUB, forming a breakaway organization called "The Lordly Christian Community of Christian Brotherhood". They left British Columbia for Shouldice, Alberta, where they set up their own village, about 50 miles east of Calgary, which existed until 1943.

In the meantime, Verigin's son, Peter Petrovich Verigin, arrived from the USSR and assumed the leadership of CCUB in 1928. After the bankruptcy of CCUB, he reorganized it as the Union of Spiritual Communities of Christ (USCC) in 1938, with headquarters in Grand Forks, British Columbia.

When Peter Petrovich Verigin died in 1939, the Community Doukhobors proclaimed his son, Peter Petrovich Verigin II as their new spiritual leader. Since he was confined to Soviet prisons at the time, his son (and Peter Vasilevich Verigin's great-grandson), John J. Verigin, who was 17 at the time, became the de facto leader of USCC. In 1960, after the confirmed death of P.P. Verigin II in Russia, J.J. Verigin, Sr., became "Honorary Chairman" of the USCC Doukhobors at age 18.

After John J. ("J.J.") Verigin, Sr., died in 2008, his son John J. Verigin, Jr., (also called "J.J.") was elected to this heredity position as "Executive Director". Among Canadian USCC Doukhobors, father and son are often distinguished as "J.J. Senior" and "J.J. Junior".

== Published works by Peter V. Verigin ==
- "Pisʹma dukhoborcheskago rukovoditeli︠a︡ Petra Vasilʹevicha Verigina" (Письма духоборческаго руководителя Петра Васильевича Веригина : Letters of the Doukhobor Leader Peter Vasilievich Verigin), published by Anna Chertkov, 1901. No ISBN. Google eBook

== See also ==
- List of unsolved murders (1900–1979)
