= Vladimir Kolesov =

Soviet and Russian linguist (1934–2019)

- Владимир Колесов
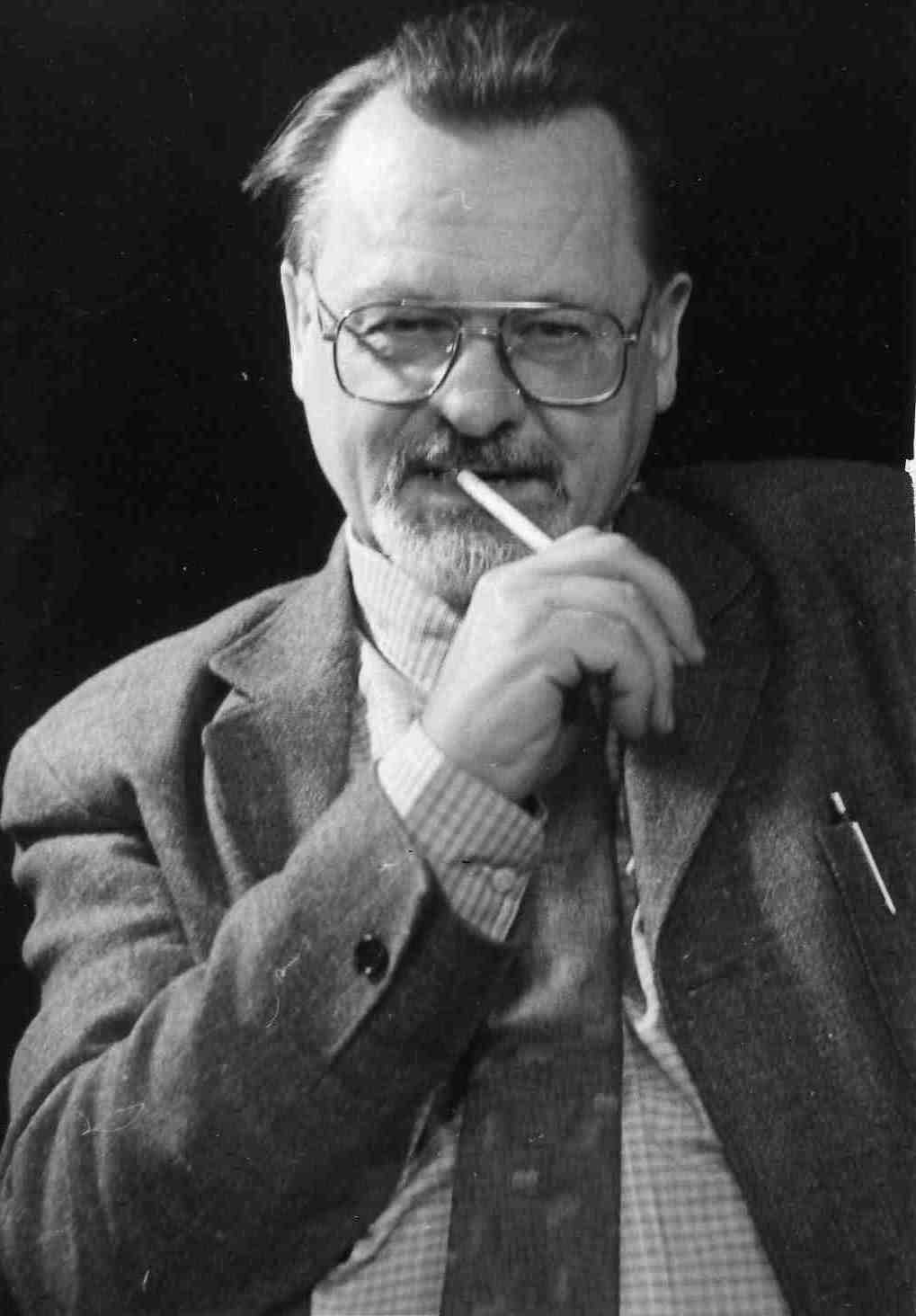
- Born: 10 April 1934; Leningrad, Soviet Union
- Died: 15 May 2019 (aged 85); Saint-Petersburg, Russian Federation
- Education: Leningrad State University
- Scientific career
- Fields: phonology, accentology, lexicography, grammar
- Workplaces: Saint Petersburg State University
- Doctoral advisor: Nikita A. Meshchersky; Maria A. Sokolova
- Website: vvkolesov.ru

Vladimir Viktorovich Kolesov (Note: Russian: Влади́мир Ви́кторович Ко́лесов, romanized: Vladímir Víktorovich Kólesov, IPA: [vlɐˈdʲimʲɪr ˈvʲiktərəvʲɪtɕ ˈkolʲɪsəf].) (10 April 1934 – 15 May 2019) was a Soviet and Russian linguist. He was a specialist in phonology, accentology, historical grammar and lexicography, philosophy of language and history of linguistics. Doctor of Philological Sciences (1969), full professor (1973), Honorary Professor of St. Petersburg State University (2018). Professor and Head of the Department of the Russian Language of the Faculty of Philology of St. Petersburg State University (1979‒2006).

== Biography ==
In 1957 he graduated from the Faculty of Russian Language and Literature of Leningrad State University. In 1960, he also completed postgraduate studies there under the advisor of Maria Sokolova and in 1962 defended his thesis for the degree of Candidate of Philological Sciences on the topic “On the historical phonetics of Novgorod dialects”. In 1969, at the Leningrad State University, he defended his dissertation for the degree of Doctor of Philological Sciences on the topic “Nominal accentuation in the Old Russian language”.

In 1962‒1964 he was an assistant, in 1964‒1971 he became an associate professor and since 1971 he has been a full professor. In 1978‒2006 he was the head of the Department of the Russian Language of St. Petersburg State University. In 1966 he was awarded the academic title of associate professor, in 1973 the academic title of full professor.

== Research activity ==
Author of more than 500 works of various genres. He consistently polemized with the Moscow School of Historians of the Russian language (Andrey Zaliznyak, Vladimir Uspensky, Viktor Zhivov, etc.).

=== Awards and prizes ===
- Medal “Veteran of Labour”
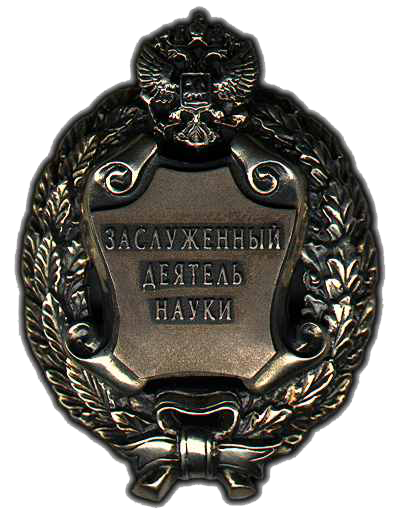
- Honoured Science Worker of the Russian Federation

== Monographs ==
- Kolesov, Vladimir V. (1972). Istoriya russkogo udareniya: Imennaya aktsentuatsiya v drevnerusskom yazyke. Leningrad: Leningrad State University. p. 256.
- Kolesov, Vladimir V. (1973). Vvedeniye v istoricheskuyu fonologiyu: konspekt lektsiy. prochitannykh studentam gosudarstvennogo universiteta v Segede v aprele 1972 goda. Szeged.
- Kolesov, Vladimir V. (1976). Istoriya russkogo yazyka v rasskazakh. Moscow: Education. p. 176.
- Kolesov, Vladimir V. (1978). Ocherki po russkoy istoricheskoy aktsentologii. Szeged. p. 176.
- Kolesov, Vladimir V. (1980). Istoricheskaya fonetika russkogo yazyka. Moscow. p. 215.
- Kolesov, Vladimir V. (1982). Vvedeniye v istoricheskuyu fonologiyu. Leningrad: Leningrad State University. p. 120.
- Kolesov, Vladimir V. (1986). Mir cheloveka v slove Drevney Rusi. Leningrad: Leningrad State University. p. 312.
- Kolesov, Vladimir V. (1987). Lev Shcherba. Moscow. p. 160.
- Kolesov, Vladimir V. (1989). Drevnerusskiy literaturnyy yazyk. Leningrad: Leningrad State University. p. 296.
- Kolesov, Vladimir V. (1988). Kultura rechi — kultura povedeniya. Leningrad: Lenizdat. p. 271. ISBN 5-289-00151-4.
- Kolesov, Vladimir V. (1991). Yazyk goroda. Moscow: Vysshaya shkola. p. 192. ISBN 5-06-001-674-9.
- Kolesov, Vladimir V. (1998). Russkaya rech. Vchera. Segodnya. Zavtra. Saint Petersburg: Vysshaya shkola. p. 246. ISBN 5-86720-012-4.
- Kolesov, Vladimir V. (2000). Drevnyaya Rus: naslediye v slove. Kn. 1. Mir cheloveka. Saint Petersburg: Saint Petersburg State University. p. 328. ISBN 5-8465-0029-3.
- Kolesov, Vladimir V. (2001). Drevnyaya Rus: naslediye v slove. Kn. 2. Dobro i zlo. Saint Petersburg: Saint Petersburg State University. p. 304. ISBN 5-8465-0030-7.
- Kolesov, Vladimir V. (2004). Drevnyaya Rus: naslediye v slove. Kn. 3. Bytiye i byt. Saint Petersburg: Saint Petersburg State University. p. 400. ISBN 5-8465-0224-5.
- Kolesov, Vladimir V. (2007). Russkaya mentalnost v yazyke i tekste. Saint Petersburg: Peterburgskoye vostokovedeniye. p. 640. ISBN 978-5-85803-339-4.
- Kolesov, Vladimir V. (2011). Drevnyaya Rus: naslediye v slove. Kn. 4. Mudrost slova. Saint Petersburg: Saint Petersburg State University. p. 400. ISBN 978-5-8465-0236-9.
- Kolesov, Vladimir V. (2009). Istoricheskaya grammatika russkogo yazyka. Moscow: Academia. p. 512. ISBN 978-5-7695-5687-6.
  - Kolesov, Vladimir V. (2013). Istoricheskaya grammatika russkogo yazyka. 2-e izd. Moscow: Academia. p. 512. ISBN 978-5-8465-1316-7.

== Bibliography ==
- Morozova, E. A. (2009). "Kolesov Vladimir Viktorovich. Professor Leningradskogo (Sankt-Peterburgskogo) universiteta". Вестник Санкт-Петербургского Университета. Язык И Литература (4). Saint Petersburg: Vestnik Sankt-Peterburgskogo universiteta: 266‒267.
- Sadova, T. S. (2014). "Professor Sankt-Peterburgskogo gosudarstvennogo universiteta V. V. Kolesov". Вестник Санкт-Петербургского Университета. Язык И Литература (3). Saint Petersburg: Vestnik Sankt-Peterburgskogo universiteta: 5‒7.

== Links ==
- A website dedicated to the life and work of V. V. Kolesov.
- Biographical sketch
- Department of the Russian Language of the Faculty of Philology and Arts of St. Petersburg State University
