= International Workshop on Balto-Slavic Accentology =

The International Workshop on Balto-Slavic Accentology (abbreviated IWoBA) was an annual international conference on comparative and historical Balto-Slavic accentology, including the prehistory and history of the separate Baltic and Slavic languages, as well as synchronic and dialectal issues that have to do with accentology.

The first conference was held in Zagreb 1–3 July 2005 with contributions by some of the world's foremost Balto-Slavists, Baltologists and Slavists, organized by the Croatian linguists Ranko Matasović and Mate Kapović. It proved to be an immense success and was thus followed by annually held IWoBA conferences, until the final conference in 2015.

== Conferences ==
Number	Date	Location	Organizers
IWoBA I	1–3 July 2005	Zagreb	Ranko Matasović, Mate Kapović
IWoBA II	1–3 September 2006	Copenhagen	Thomas Olander, Adam Hyllested and Jenny Helena Larsson
IWoBA III	27–29 July 2007	Leiden	Tijmen Pronk
IWoBA IV	2–3 July 2008	Scheibbs	Elena Stadnik-Holzer
IWoBA V	7–10 July 2009	Opava	Roman Sukač
IWoBA VI	7–10 July 2010	Vilnius	Vytautas Rinkevičius
IWoBA VII	7–10 July 2011	Moscow	Mikhail Oslon
IWoBA VIII	6–8 July 2012	Novi Sad (Serbia)	Dragana Novakov
IWoBA IX	19–21 September 2013	Pula (Croatia)	David Mandić
IWoBA X	16–18 October 2014	Ljubljana	Matej Šekli
IWoBA XI	28–31 October 2015	Vilnius	Vytautas Rinkevičius, Mikhail Oslon and Tijmen Pronk
IWoBA XII	4–7 June 2019	Ljubljana	Luka Repanšek
