= Andrey Zaliznyak =

Russian linguist (1935–2017)

- Андрей Зализняк
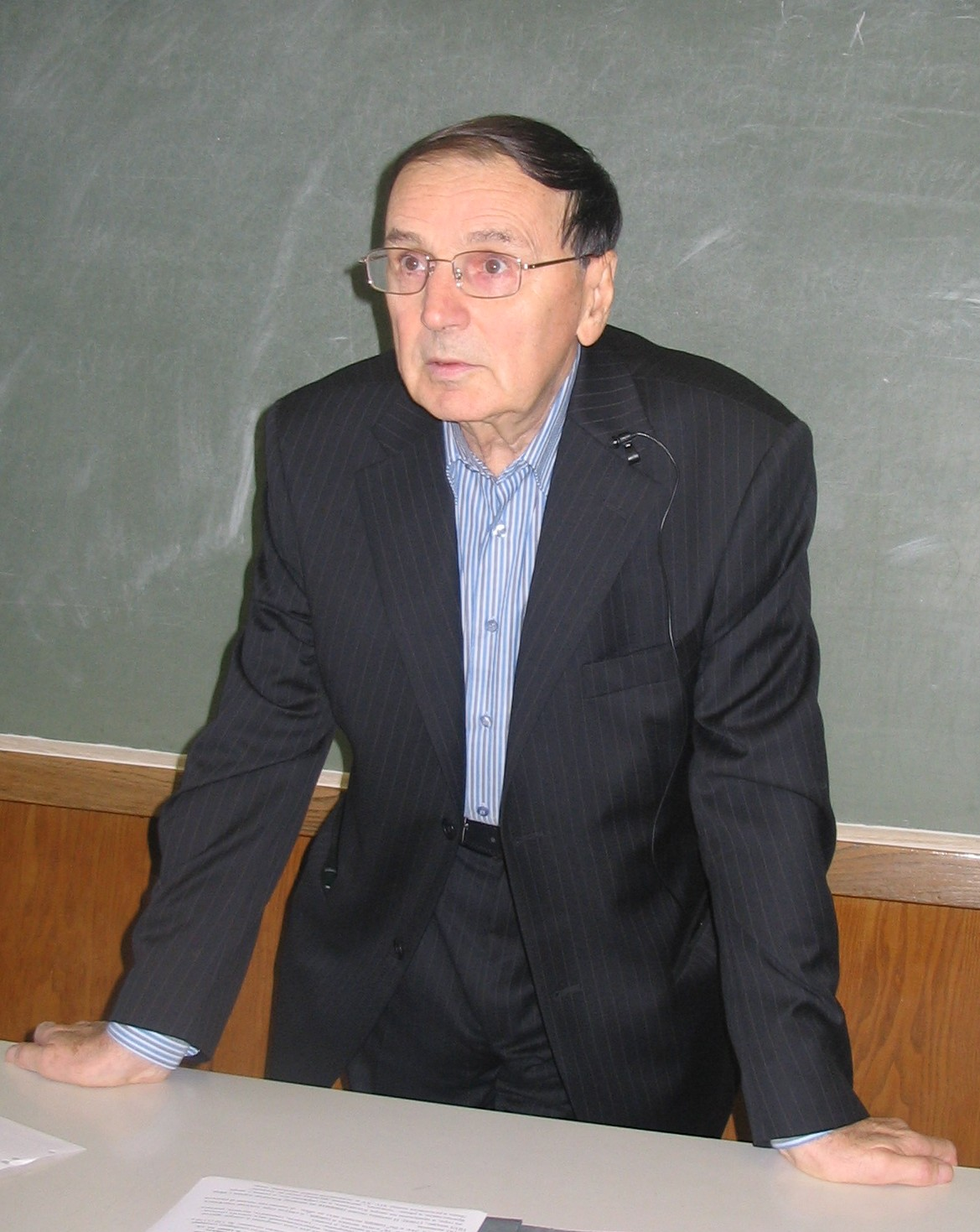
- Zaliznyak in 2008
- Born: 29 April 1935; Moscow, Soviet Union
- Died: 24 December 2017 (aged 82); Moscow, Russia
- Education: Moscow State University
- Spouse: Yelena Paducheva (m. 1958)
- Scientific career
- Fields: Historical linguistics; accentology; dialectology; grammar
- Thesis: Classification and synthesis of nominal paradigms of the modern Russian language (Классификация и синтез именных парадигм современного русского языка) (1965)
- Doctoral advisor: Vyacheslav Ivanov

Andrey Anatolyevich Zaliznyak (Russian: Андре́й Анато́льевич Зализня́к; 29 April 1935 – 24 December 2017) was a Russian linguist who specialized in historical linguistics, morphology, accentology, and dialectology. He served as the leading researcher on medieval Novgorod birchbark documents and proved the authenticity of The Tale of Igor's Campaign. His Grammatical Dictionary of the Russian Language (1977) remains the standard reference for Russian inflection and forms the basis for most Russian language processing algorithms.

== Biography ==
Andrey Zaliznyak was born in Moscow on 29 April 1935 to Anatoly Andreyevich Zaliznyak, an engineer, and Tatiana Konstantinovna Krapivina, a chemist. During World War II, the family was in evacuation. There, Andrey joined a German language class, but his teacher called him incapable of learning languages; his mother was advised not to waste time in teaching him German. Instead of repeating phrases after the teacher, Zaliznyak composed a table of German words for six colors. After the war, Zaliznyak was sent to relatives to Pruzhany in Western Belarus; his relatives had a lot of Polish-language books, and he met a priest who knew Latin. He became fascinated by languages and bought multiple grammar books. Several years later, he had a head injury while playing football and spent four days unconscious; bedridden, he spent two weeks with a French grammar book. As a teenager he learned Polish, Latin, English, Italian, and Spanish to a various degree of proficiency.

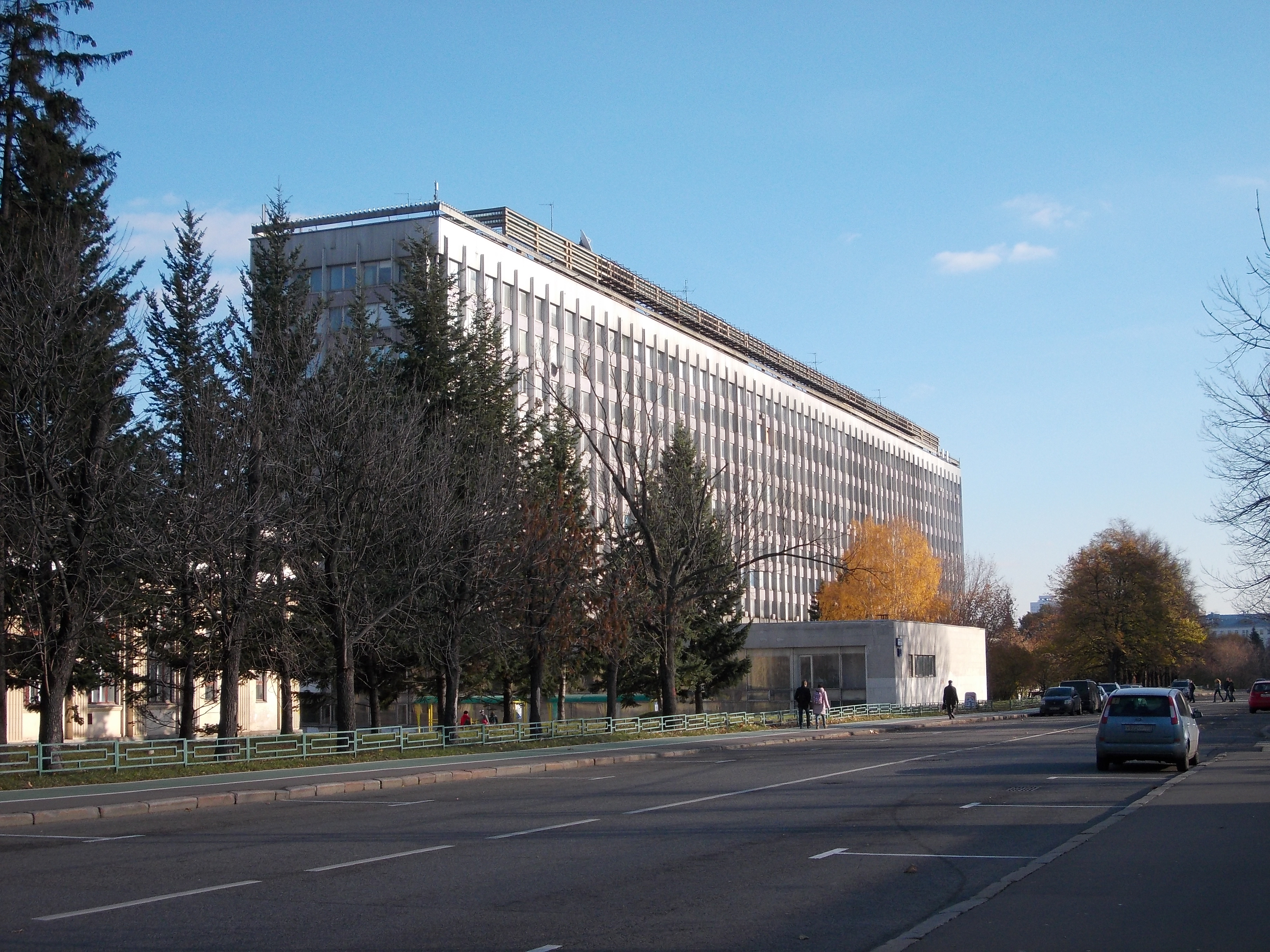
MSU Philological faculty building

In 1951 Zaliznyak participated in the first Language and Literature Olympiad organized by the philology department at Moscow State University, where he met his future wife, Yelena Paducheva, for the first time. He took first place, and she took third; in the following year, the two came joint first. Paducheva later became his classmate at MSU.

Zaliznyak began studying linguistics at MSU in 1952, focusing on English and Swedish. In 1956, he was chosen to be sent to France as an exchange student for a year. He had not studied French at university, but learned it by himself. According to Zaliznyak, he was chosen not because of his knowledge of the language, but because there were only women in the French department, and Soviet authorities did not trust women to be sent abroad. He was sent to the Sorbonne, but was advised to go to École Normale Supérieure by his friends Michel Aucouturier and Claude Frioux, two French exchange students he met a year before at MSU. While in France, Zaliznyak tutored French students in Russian. Before France, he had not been interested in Russian, and had never taught. For his tutoring, he composed a ten-thousand-word dictionary and a Russian grammar. With the money he earned, he bought a camera. He attended courses by the Indologist Louis Renou and the Iranist Émile Benveniste, and followed both Michel Lejeune's lectures on Mycenean linguistics and the course of André Martinet, whose book Économie des changements phonétiques ('Economy of Phonetic Changes') he later translated into Russian. His work in Paris led him to conclude that a complete formalized description of Russian morphology was needed.

Back in Moscow, Zaliznyak was admitted to aspirantura and started teaching. He read courses on multiple subjects, including Sanskrit, Vedic hymns, Persian cuneiform, the Arabic and Biblical Hebrew languages, and a seminar on linguistic problems.

In 1958, he graduated from the Department of Romance and Germanic Languages at Moscow State University. His advisor was Vyacheslav Ivanov; in the same year, Ivanov was fired from the university for his support of Boris Pasternak and connections with Roman Jakobson.

[Zaliznyak] never got distracted by trifles, never wrote a single throwaway work, unnecessary paragraph, or unnecessary line. Everything he wrote was a benchmark of quality and served to solve the main problems of life. Hence the titanic productivity, which in recent years not only did not weaken, but on the contrary, increased.

— Alexey Gippius

In 1960, Zaliznyak was invited to the Institute for Slavic Studies of the Soviet Academy of Sciences to Samuil Bernstein's group, and was assigned to study "Slavic–Iranian language contacts". He soon became interested in other topics, but published two papers on it before switching to Russian language studies.

Zaliznyak defended his candidate thesis at the Institute for Slavic Studies in 1965 on "Classification and synthesis of nominal paradigms of the modern Russian language", for which he was immediately awarded the Doctor of Philological Sciences degree, instead of the Candidate degree. From 1960 until his death, Zaliznyak worked at the institute as a chief researcher in the department of typology and comparative linguistics. He simultaneously taught at Moscow State University's Philological Faculty, becoming a professor in 1973.

In 1988, Zaliznyak started to lecture in Europe. He also traveled by trains, as his old head injury made it impossible for him to travel by plane. He lectured internationally at the University of Provence (1989–1990), University of Paris (1991), and University of Geneva (1992–2000). In 1987, he became a corresponding member of the USSR Academy of Sciences, and in 1997, a full academician of the Russian Academy of Sciences. In 2001, he became a member of Gottingen Academy of Science.

== Major contributions ==
=== Russian language and morphology ===
Zaliznyak's first monograph, Russian Nominal Inflection (Русское именное словоизменение, 1967), established a derivational architecture for analyzing Russian morphology, contrasting with the Soviet preference for declarative approaches that avoided paradigms and derivation. He "proposed algorithmic definitions of case and gender categories", inspired by mathematicians Andrey Kolmogorov and Vladimir Uspensky. His analysis identified more than the traditional six Russian cases, including partitive, locative, and special adnumeral forms. He defined morphological gender as combinations of inflectional types and distinguished it from syntactic gender based on agreement patterns.

Together with his wife Yelena Paducheva, Zaliznyak proposed "a typology of relative clauses in the vein of Émile Benveniste's work" in 1975. The paper was called "a precursor to the study of grammaticalization".

In 1977, Zaliznyak published the Grammatical Dictionary of the Russian Language (Грамматический словарь русского языка), which was the first publication to include a full overview of Russian words with precise grammar characteristics of each one. It consists of 110,000 words, arranged alphabetically by last character (e.g., баба, жаба, раба, изба, бомба, рыба, судьба). Zaliznyak collected words on thin paper cards in four wooden boxes taken from a bakery. The dictionary became heavily used in the 1990s on the Russian Internet for web search, spell checkers, and online translators. It is still the definitive description of Russian inflection patterns.

Zaliznyak also developed a theory of Russian accentology, starting with the analysis of Old Russian book Merilo Pravednoye.

=== Birchbark letters and Old Novgorod dialect ===
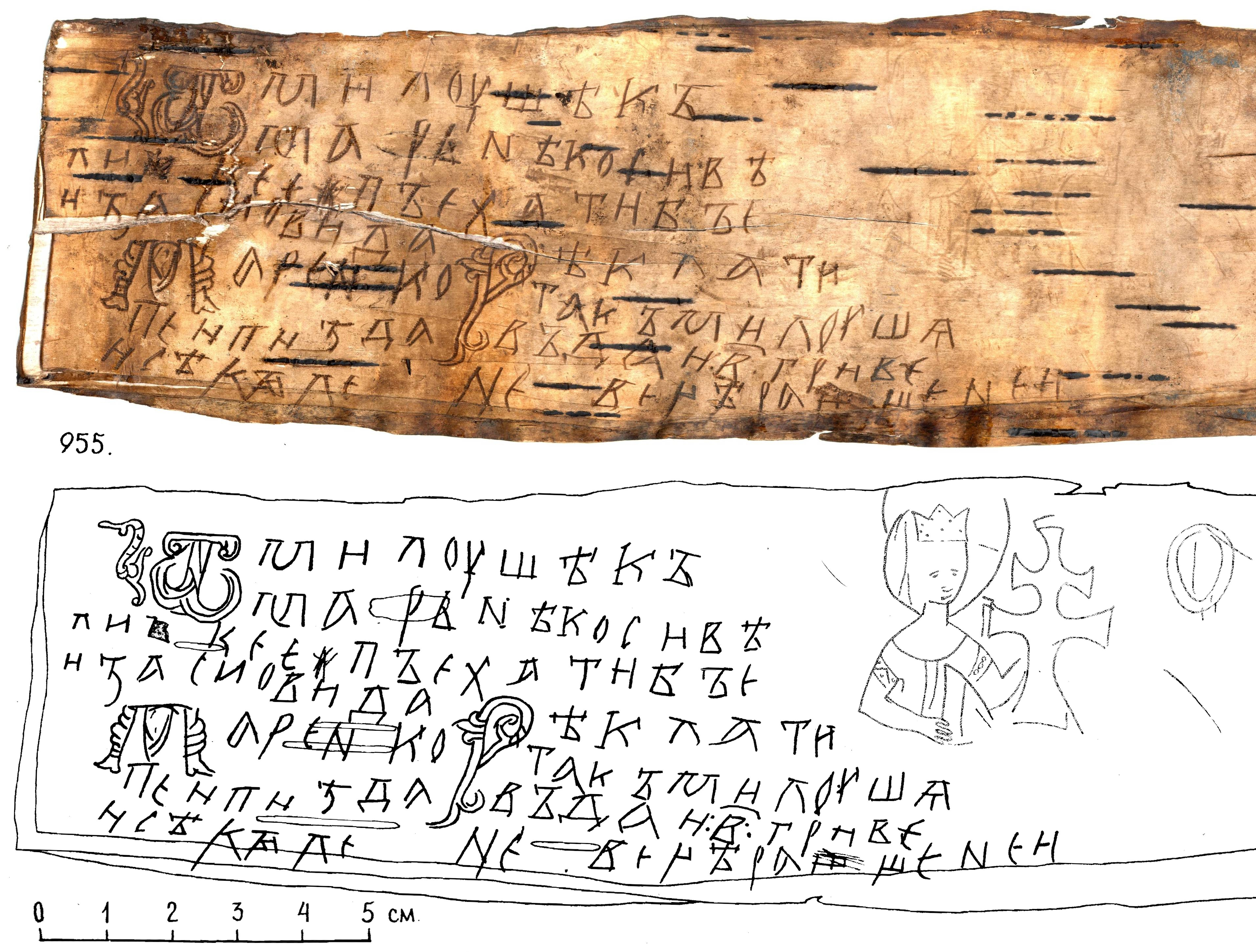
Novgorod birchbark letter 955 (12th century)

Zaliznyak became interested in birchbark letters in 1980, when he received Artemiy Artsikhovsky's publications from the 1950s as a gift from a friend, the mathematician Leonid Bassalygo. Artsikhovsky was the first head of the Novgorod archeological expedition, which found the first birchbark letter in 1951. Zaliznyak soon found a lot of inconsistencies in the letters' reading. Birchbark letters became a major theme in his studies for decades; Zaliznyak corrected old readings and deciphered several previously undeciphered letters. He gave his first lecture on the letters in 1981, and the historian Valentin Yanin, the head of the Novgorod archeological expedition, was so impressed with Zaliznyak's linguistic analysis that he immediately asked Zaliznyak to join. Zaliznyak participated in expeditions for thirty-five years. Yanin joked that Zaliznyak was the most important find of the Novgorod archeological expedition.

Beginning in 1986, Zaliznyak gave annual lectures on newly found and translated birchbark letters, which became a cultural event in Moscow. Together with Yanin, he published four volumes on the Novgorod birchbark letters.

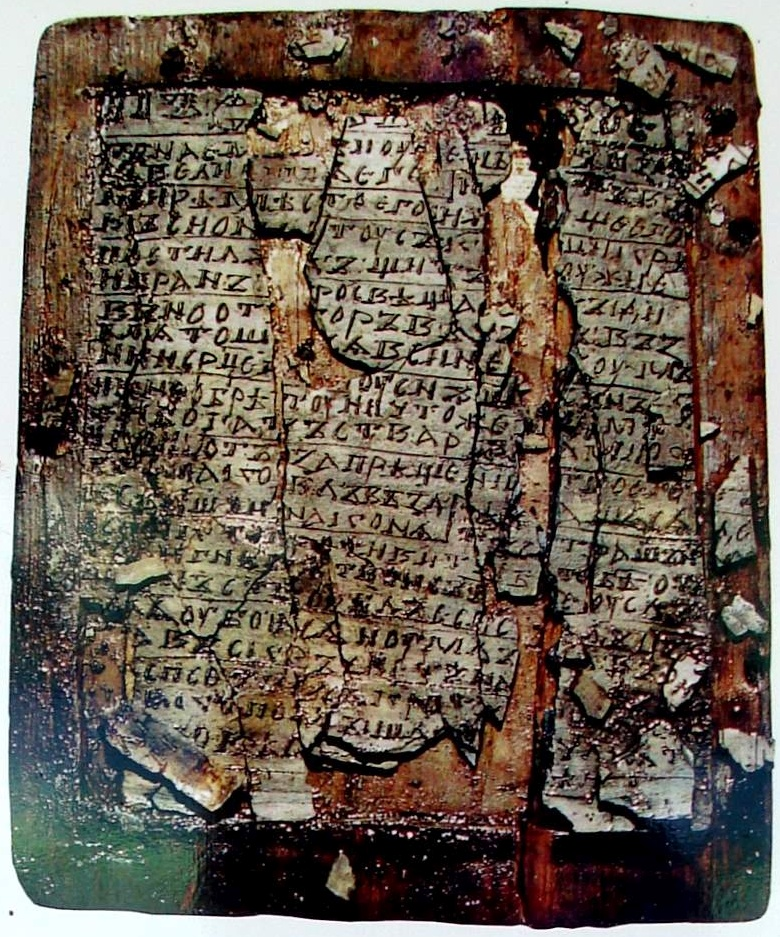
First page of the Codex at the time of discovery

The linguist Vladimir Plungian described Zaliznyak's work with birchbark letters:

He somehow miraculously transformed into an ancient Novgorodian and read birchbark letters from almost a thousand years ago as if he were standing behind the shoulder of those who wrote them and knew their thoughts.

Zaliznyak established that these documents used a graphic system different from Church Slavonic and contained few errors, contrary to previous beliefs that they represented barely literate writing.

Zaliznyak's strict definition of graphemes and the distinction between graphic systems and orthography enabled his discovery that the letters preserved an unknown East Slavic variety: the Old Novgorod dialect. This dialect featured phenomena unknown elsewhere in the Slavic world, including lack of second palatalization of velars and the ending -e in nominative singular of masculine o-stems. His monograph Old Novgorod Dialect (1995, revised in 2004) provided comprehensive analysis of this linguistic variety, demonstrating that East Slavic displayed much greater dialectal diversity than previously thought. He also described the system of Wackernagel enclitics in Old Russian, culminating in Old Russian Enclitics (2008).

=== Novgorod Codex ===
In 2000, the 11th-century book the Novgorod Codex was found during an expedition. It had multiple barely visible texts written on wax, and on the wooden base under the wax. Zaliznyak was able to decipher several fragments of these texts. Some of his decipherments were met with suspicion, because the texts were barely visible and layered one upon another.

=== The Tale of Igor's Campaign ===
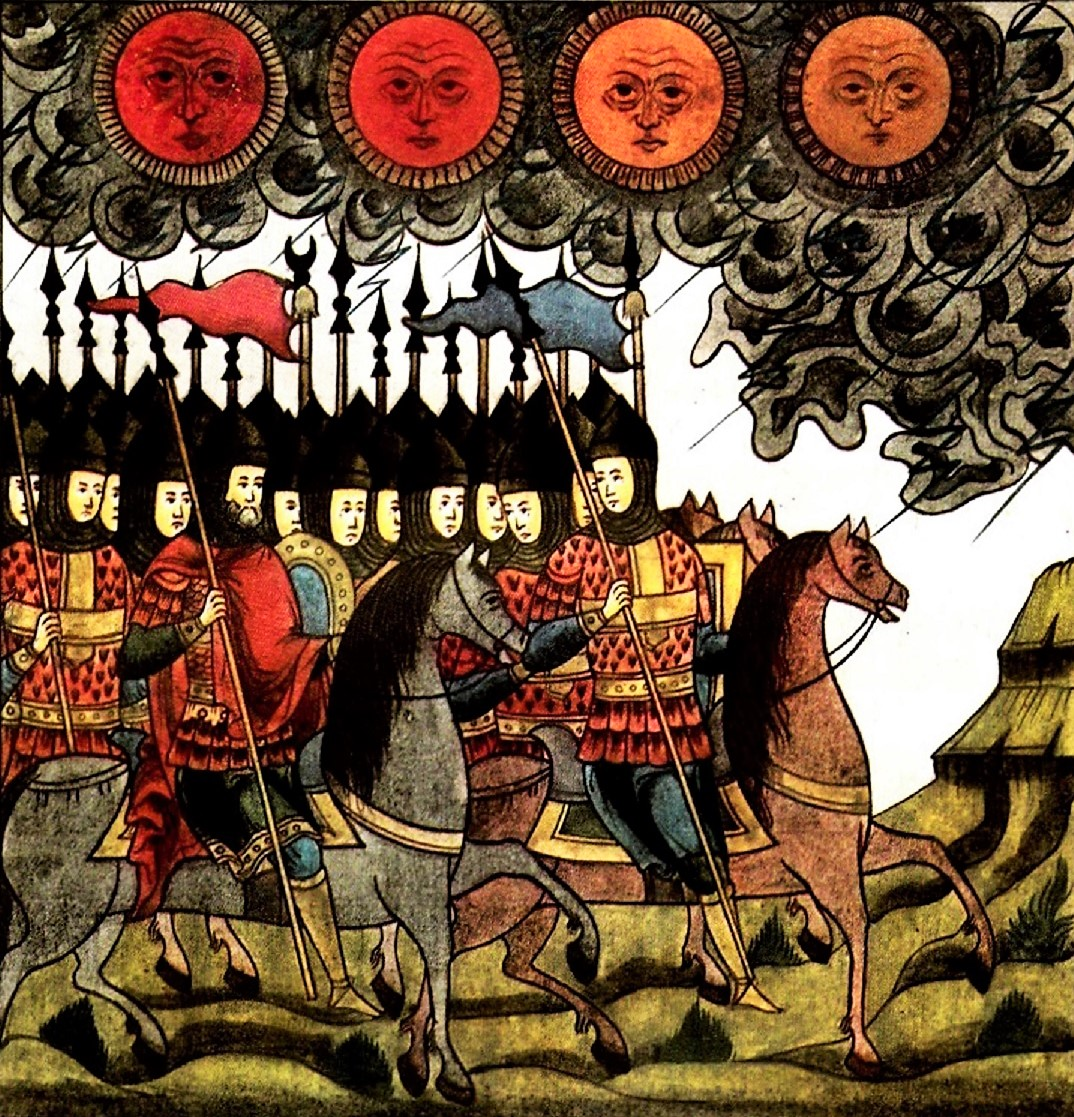
Ivan Blinov's illustration for the 1912 edition

In 2004, Zaliznyak published a linguistic analysis of The Tale of Igor's Campaign that examined arguments concerning its authenticity. The Tale of Igor's Campaign was found in 1795 by Aleksei Musin-Pushkin; the manuscript was destroyed in a fire in 1812. Since its first publication, the question of its authenticity became a theme of a two-hundred-years-long debate; multiple noted linguists and writers, including Alexander Pushkin and Leo Tolstoy, participated in it. Zaliznyak demonstrated that the relationship between the 12th-century Tale and the later 14th-century Zadonshchina supported the Tale's authenticity: passages in Zadonshchina with counterparts in the Tale differed linguistically from the rest of that text, while the Tale showed no such inconsistencies. Zaliznyak argued that no 18th-century forger could have reproduced the grammatical subtleties of 12th-century language. He also showed that there were no mistakes in enclitic usage, and the laws describing it were unknown in the 18th century.

=== Linguistic education and olympiads ===
In 1963, Zaliznyak published "Linguistic Problems", introducing self-contained linguistic problems for introductory linguistics courses. These problems tested structuralist principles by requiring students to deduce grammatical patterns from limited data. His puzzles were intended to be solved using logic without knowledge of languages mentioned in a puzzle, for example finding an error in a set of Basque-language sentences or translation of Albanian phrases to Biblical Hebrew given a sample of six such pairs. His puzzles led to the first Traditional Olympiad in Linguistics and Mathematics for high school students in 1965, spreading internationally to become the International Olympiad in Linguistics in 2003. Zaliznyak participated in the olympiad for many years, and published the first twenty-six problems including the following:

Initial data: Given is a text of 6 phrases in unfamiliar language A (Albanian) with translation of each phrase into unfamiliar language B (Biblical Hebrew).

The Albanian text is given in regular orthography. For the ancient Hebrew text, a Latin transliteration of the consonantal script is provided (i.e., script without vowel markings).

Language A – Language B

1. Mizë pi. – yšth zbwb.
2. Miza pinin. – štw zbwbym.
3. Mizë pinte. – šth zbwb.
4. Mizat pinë. – yštw hzbwbym.
5. Miza pinë. – yštw zbwbym.
6. Miza pi. – yšth hzbwb.

Task: Translate from language B to language A the following two phrases:

1. šth hzbwb.
2. štw hzbwbym.

== Personal life ==
Zaliznyak married linguist Yelena Paducheva in 1958, with whom he co-authored several papers. Their daughter, Anna Zaliznyak, was born in 1959. She also became a linguist, and specializes in Russian aspectology and semantic typology.

Colleagues described him as "a warm, supportive and modest person, completely uninterested in fame and awards, but devoted to science and the quest for truth. A very decent and admirable human being."

Zaliznyak loved Paris, and at the end of 1980s, when Soviet citizens were allowed to travel abroad, often travelled to France, Italy, and other European countries by train. He lectured in Russian, English, French, and once in Italian.

Zaliznyak had a heart attack in 1984, and later had heart surgery in Sweden. He died in Moscow on 24 December 2017 at age 82.

== Awards and honors ==
- 1997: Demidov Prize
- 2007: State Prize of the Russian Federation
- 2007: Solzhenitsyn Prize
- 2007: Lomonosov Gold Medal
- 2015: Shakhmatov Prize

== Selected publications ==
Zaliznyak published several hundreds of articles, see a partial bibliography 1958-2010 and the list of papers in the MSU database.

Below is a list of Zaliznyak's books and dictionaries, arranged by date. Further editions are in parentheses. All books are in Russian.

- Краткий русско-французский учебный словарь 1961 (1964, 1969, 1978)
- Русское именное словоизменение, 1967
- Грамматический словарь русского языка, 1977 (1980, 1987, 2003, 2008)
- Грамматический очерк санскрита, 1978 (1987, 1996, 2005, 2019, 2022)
- От праславянской акцентуации к русской, 1985
- Зализняк А. А., Янин В. Л. Новгородские грамоты на бересте (Из раскопок 1977—1983 гг.). Комментарии и словоуказатель к берестяным грамотам (Из раскопок 1951—1983 гг.), 1986
- «Мерило Праведное» XIV века как акцентологический источник, 1990
- Зализняк А. А., Янин В. Л. Новгородские грамоты на бересте (Из раскопок 1984—1989 гг.), 1993
- Древненовгородский диалект, 1995 (2004)
- Зализняк А. А., Янин В. Л. Новгородские грамоты на бересте (Из раскопок 1990—1996 гг.). Палеография берестяных грамот и их внестратиграфическое датирование. — Том X, 2000
- «Русское именное словоизменение» с приложением избранных работ по современному русскому языку и общему языкознанию, 2002
- Гиппиус А. А., Зализняк А. А., Янин В. Л. Новгородские грамоты на бересте (Из раскопок 1997—2000 гг.). — Том XI, 2004.
- «Слово о полку Игореве»: взгляд лингвиста, 2004 (2008, 2024)
- Древнерусские энклитики, 2008
- Из заметок о любительской лингвистике, 2010 (2023)
- Труды по акцентологии
  - Том I, 2010
  - Том II. Древнерусский и старовеликорусский акцентологический словарь-указатель (XIV—XVII вв), 2011
- Лингвистические задачи, 2013 (2016, 2018)
- Древнерусское ударение: Общие сведения и словарь, 2014
- Прогулки по Европе, 2018
