= Helmut Keipert =

German Slavist and linguist

- Born: November 19, 1941 (age 84); Greiz, Germany
- Occupation: Professor

Academic background
- Education: University of Bonn

Academic work
- Discipline: Linguistics
- Sub-discipline: Slavic languages
- Institutions: University of Bonn

Helmut Keipert (German pronunciation: [ˈhɛlmuːt ˈka͜ɪpəʁt], born 19 November 1941 in Greiz) is a German Slavist and linguist. He is professor emeritus for Slavic philology at the University of Bonn.

== Biography ==
Helmut Keipert was born in Greiz in Thuringia. After going to school in Greiz and, from 1957 on, in Moers, in 1961 he went to the University of Bonn to study Slavic philology, Latin philology, and general and comparative linguistics. His main teacher in Slavic philology was Margarete Woltner, a student of Max Vasmer’s. During the summer semester of 1963, Keipert attended lectures at Marburg University, particularly with Herbert Bräuer, another one of Vasmer's students. In 1967 he received his PhD from Bonn University, in 1968 his teacher diploma, and in 1974 he was habilitated at the same institution.

From 1967 to 1977, Keipert worked as an assistant to Miroslav Kravar (Woltner's successor after her retirement) at the University of Bonn. In 1977 he became a full professor there and stayed in this position until his retirement in 2007. From 1990 to 1992 he served as dean of the Faculty of Humanities. He supervised eleven PhD dissertation and one habilitation thesis.

From 1984 to 1992, Helmut Keipert was an expert referee for the German Research Foundation, and from 1995 to 2004 he was a member of the central board of the Alexander von Humboldt Foundation. Since 1997 he has been a corresponding member of the Göttingen Academy of Sciences and Humanities, and since 2001 of the Bavarian Academy of Sciences and Humanities.

From 1990 to 2012, Helmut Keipert was an editor of the renowned journal Zeitschrift für Slavische Philologie. Since its inception in 2001, he has been a member of the editorial board of the Russian journal Русский язык в научном освещении (English title: Russian Language and Linguistic Theory).

In 2011, the Institute of Russian of the Russian Academy of Sciences awarded Keipert an honorary doctorate.

== Research ==
Helmut Keipert has published more than ten books and over 200 articles and reviews. He has investigated almost all the Slavic languages as well as non-Slavic languages for comparison. At the centre of his research interests lie the emergence and development of standard languages. For example, in his “History of the Russian literary language” (1984, 2nd edn. 1999), he employs a functionalist approach (ultimately based on ideas by Alexander Isachenko and Nikolai Trubetzkoy) by describing the process of standardization as a gradual acquisition of the four features of a standard language as proposed by the Prague linguistic circle: polyvalence (i.e. ability to be used in all spheres of communication); stylistic differentiation; codification in grammars, dictionaries and phrase books; and general obligatoriness. Thus, he can describe when the Russian standard language came to be used in each text type and therefore became more and more polyvalent in the course of the centuries (e.g. being used by artisans and merchants since the Middle Ages but only in 1876 for the translation of the Bible). This approach is an inspiring alternative to traditional descriptions of the history of standard languages, which emphasize either the development of a linguistic norm or of a ‘high’ register.

Keipert published extensively on Russian grammaticography before Mikhail Lomonosov’s famous grammar of 1755. His works show how many grammatical conceptions had been developed earlier mainly at the Academy of Sciences in Saint Petersburg (e.g. by Glück, Paus, Schwanwitz, or Adodurov) and thus ultimately borrowed from Western Europe.

Especially since the 2000s, Keipert has intensively investigated the mutual influences of the Serbian and Croatian standard languages during their history in the 19th century as well as German translations into these languages.

Another main area of Keipert's research are the histories of words, concepts, texts, and patterns of word formation. For example, his habilitation thesis about the adjectives in ‑telʹn‑ shows how adjectives based on this Church Slavonic-Greek word formation pattern were borrowed into Russian (and from there into many other Slavic languages) to form a specifically ‘bookish’ means of expression.

== Selected works ==
- Beiträge zur Textgeschichte und Nominalmorphologie des “Vremennik Ivana Timofeeva”. (Phil. Diss.) Bonn 1968.
- Die Adjektive auf -telьnъ: Studien zu einem kirchenslavischen Wortbildungstyp. 2 vols. Wiesbaden 1977/1985.
- Geschichte der russischen Literatursprache, in: Handbuch des Russisten, edited by Helmut Jachnow, Wiesbaden 1984, 444–481; 2nd edn.: Handbuch der sprachwissenschaftlichen Russistik und ihrer Grenzdisziplinen, edited by Helmut Jachnow, Wiesbaden 1999, 726–779.
- Die Christianisierung Rußlands als Gegenstand der russischen Sprachgeschichte, in: Tausend Jahre Christentum in Rußland: Zum Millennium der Taufe der Kiever Rus’, edited by K. Chr. Felmy, G. Kretschmar, F. von Lilienfeld, and C.-J. Roepke. Göttingen 1988, 313–346. [Russian translation: Крещение Руси и история русского литературного языка, Вопросы языкознания 1991(5), 86–112.]
- J. E. Glück, Grammatik der russischen Sprache (1704). Edited and with an introduction by H. Keipert, B. Uspenskij, and V. Živov. Köln, Weimar, Wien 1994.
- Die knigi cerkovnye in Lomonosovs “Predislovie o pol’ze knig cerkovnych v rossijskom jazyke”, Zeitschrift für slavische Philologie 54(1) (1994), 21–37. [Russian translation: Церковные книги в «Предисловии о пользе книг церковных в российском языке» М. В. Ломоносова, Русистика сегодня 1995(4), 31–46.]
- Pope, Popovskij und die Popen: Zur Entstehungsgeschichte der russischen Übersetzung des “Essay on Man” (1754–57). Göttingen 2001.
- “Rozmova/Besěda”: Das Gesprächsbuch Slav. № 7 der Bibliothèque nationale de France. Zeitschrift für Slavische Philologie 60:1 (2001). 9–40.
- Compendium Grammaticae Russicae (edited together with Andrea Huterer), München 2002.
- Das “Sprache”-Kapitel in August Ludwig Schlözers “Nestor” und die Grundlegung der historisch-vergleichenden Methode für die slavische Sprachwissenschaft. Mit einem Anhang: Josef Dobrovskýs “Slavin”-Artikel “Über die Altslawonische Sprache nach Schlözer” und dessen russische Übersetzung von Aleksandr Chr. Vostokov. Edited by H. Keipert and M. Šm. Fajnštejn. Göttingen 2006.
- Die Pallas-Redaktion der Petersburger Vocabularia comparativa und ihre Bedeutung für die Entwicklung der slavischen Sprachwissenschaft. Historiographia Linguistica 40:1–2 (2013). 128–149.
- Kirchenslavisch-Begriffe, in: Die slavischen Sprachen: Ein internationales Handbuch zu ihrer Struktur, ihrer Geschichte und ihrer Erforschung, edited by Karl Gutschmidt, Sebastian Kempgen, Tilman Berger, and Peter Kosta, vol. 2, Berlin 2014, 1211–1252. [Russian translation: Церковнославянский язык: Круг понятий, Slověne 6.1 (2017), 8–75.]
- Obzori preporoda: Kroatističke rasprave, edited by Tomislav Bogdan and Davor Dukić, Zagreb 2014 [a collection of Keipert's writings about Croatian language history in Croatian translation].
