= Keipert =

Keipert may refer to:

- Helmut Keipert (born 1941), German Slavist and linguist
- James Ashton Keipert (1922–2021), Australian pediatrician who first described the Keipert syndrome
