= Yelena Paducheva =

Russian linguist (1935–2019)

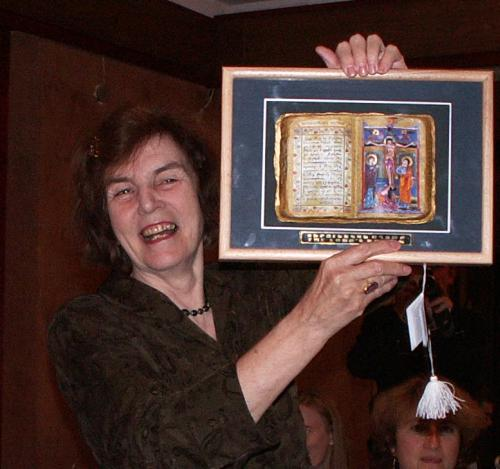
Paducheva in 2005

Yelena Viktorovna Paducheva (Russian: Елена Викторовна Падучева; 26 September 1935 – 16 July 2019) was a Russian linguist specializing in semantics, pragmatics, tense–aspect–mood and evidentiality. She spent her career as a researcher at the Russian Academy of Sciences.

== Early life and education ==
Paducheva was born and raised in Moscow, with the exception of a period when her family was evacuated to Samarkand during World War II. Her father Viktor was rarely present during her youth, as he had been accused of Trotskyism and sent to labour camps from 1936 to 1942 (Norillag) and again from 1950 to 1954; she saw him just twice between these incarcerations, on business trips in 1943 and 1948. After the war she lived in a barracks room of six square metres together with her mother.

In 1951 she participated in the first Language and Literature Olympiad organized by the philology department at Moscow State University, where she met Andrey Zaliznyak for the first time. He took first place, and she took third; in the following year, the two came joint first. Both then studied languages at Moscow State University, Paducheva initially in the Spanish department before she transferred to the English department where Zaliznyak was studying. They married in 1958 and had a daughter, Anna, in 1959.

At MSU, Yelena was taken under the wing of Olga Akhmanova, and received her diploma in English philology and literature in 1957. When Roman Jakobson visited Moscow during her studies, Akhmanova introduced her to him as “the rising star of Soviet linguistics”. Together with Vyacheslav Ivanov, Akhmanova arranged for her to receive a position at a computational laboratory that was part of VINITI. This was despite an anonymous letter to the faculty stating that Paducheva was concealing information about her father, a repressed person and a Jew. While working at VINITI, Paducheva qualified as Candidate of Philology in 1965 and as Doctor of Philology in 1984.

== Career and honours ==
Paducheva worked at VINITI, part of the Russian Academy of Sciences, for over fifty years from 1957 to 2015 – initially as researcher, then as senior researcher, and finally as lead researcher. In 1996 she was appointed professor. From 2016 until her death in 2019 she was a senior researcher at the Federal Research Centre on Informatics and Management.

In 1975 she was elected to the American Academy of Arts and Sciences, and in 2017 she was elected ordinary member of the Academia Europaea.

== Research ==
Paducheva authored ten books and circa 200 articles. Her research interests ranged broadly over topics such as the tense/aspect system of the Russian verb, the syntax–semantics interface, Russian negation, narratology, reference theory, the semantics of the Russian verb, and the deictic and egocentric components of lexical meaning. She also collaborated scientifically with her husband Andrey Zaliznyak on topics such as the history, grammaticalization and typology of relative clauses.

Paducheva worked extensively on computational lexicography, and played a leading role in the Lexicographer project for over thirty years. The project constructed a systematic database of Russian verbs, building on the insight that the lexicon is a system like other levels of linguistic analysis. Paducheva's work on Lexicographer is summarized in her 2004 book Dynamic models of lexical semantics.

== Personal life ==
Paducheva and Zaliznyak married in 1958. Their daughter, Anna Zaliznyak, was born in 1959. She also became a linguist; she is an expert in Russian aspectology and semantic typology.

== Selected publications ==
- Paducheva, Yelena V. 1985. Vyskazyvanie I ego sootvestvennost’ s dejstvitel’nost’ju: referencial’nye semantiki mestoimenii (The utterance and its correspondence with reality: referentiality of the semantics of pronouns). Moscow: Nauka.
- Paducheva, Yelena V. 1996. Semanticheskie issledovaniya: Semantika vremeni i vida v russkom yazyke; Semantika narrativa (Semantic studies: Semantics of tense and aspect in Russian; Semantics of the narrative). Moscow: Jazyka russkoj kul'tury.
- Paducheva, Yelena V. 1998. On non-compatibility of partitive and imperfective in Russian. Theoretical Linguistics 24 (1), 73–82. doi:10.1515/thli.1998.24.1.73
- Paducheva, Yelena V. 2004. Dinamicheskie modeli v semantike leksiki (Dynamic models of lexical semantics). Moscow: Jazyki slavjanskoj kul'tury.
- Borschev, Vladimir, Yelena V. Paducheva, Barbara H. Partee, Yakov G. Testelets & Igor Yanovich. 2008. Russian genitives, non-referentiality, and the property-type hypothesis. In A. Antonenko, J. F. Bailyn & Ch. Bethin (eds.), Proceedings of the Formal Approaches to Slavic Linguistics (FASL 16): The Stony Brook meeting (2007), 48–67. Ann Arbor, MI: Michigan Slavic Publishers.
