= Mate Kapović =

Croatian linguist

- Born: August 5, 1981 (age 44); Zagreb, Croatia
- Occupation: linguist

Mate Kapović (born August 5, 1981 in Zagreb) is a Croatian linguist specializing in Indo-European, Slavic languages and the Proto-Balto-Slavic language.

== Biography ==
He studied Croatian language and linguistics at the Faculty of Arts of University of Zagreb. He graduated in 2003 and he has been teaching at the same university since 2004. In 2007, he obtained his doctorate at the Faculty of Philosophy of University of Zadar (Reconstruction of Balto-Slavic Personal Pronouns with Emphasis on Accentuation).

In 2010, he was appointed docent at the University of Zagreb, and in 2014, he was appointed associate professor. At the Faculty of Arts, he lectures on general phonology, historical-comparative linguistics, phonology and Indo-European morphology. His academic interests include accentology, sociolinguistics, dialectology and language policy. He is a member of the Committee of Dialectology at the Department of Philological Sciences of the Croatian Academy of Sciences and Arts.

He has authored the following books: Uvod u indoeuropsku lingvistiku: Pregled jezikâ i poredbena fonologija (2008), Čiji je jezik? (2011), Povijest hrvatske akcentuacije: Fonetika (2015). In 2019, he coauthored Jeziku je svejedno (2019), a book devoted to the phenomenon of prescriptivism in Croatian linguistics. He has published numerous articles in Croatian and international journals. He is engaged in criticism of linguistic purism and prescriptivism. He was the initiator of the annual conference International Workshop on Balto-Slavic Accentology (IWoBA).

Kapović proposed revisions and changes to the Declaration on the Common Language prior to its publication, but stated that "they were mostly not respected" and as a result did not sign the document. He criticized the document for posturing as 'neutral', 'apolitical' and 'non-ideological'. He participated on a panel discussion on the Declaration in Zagreb.

Politically, Kapović is a leftist activist who co-founded the Workers' Front. In the 2017 Zagreb local elections, Kapović was elected as the party's first rotating representative in the Zagreb Assembly, being followed by Katarina Peović. He was the party's nominee for the 2021 Zagreb local elections, but was ultimately not re-elected.

== Selected works ==
- Uvod u indoeuropsku lingvistiku: Pregled jezikâ i poredbena fonologija (2008)
- O „pravilnosti” u jeziku (2009)
- Čiji je jezik? (2011)
- Language, ideology, and politics in Croatia (2011)
- Ogledi o kapitalizmu i demokraciji (2015)
- Povijest hrvatske akcentuacije: Fonetika (2016)
- O preskripciji i preskriptivizmu u Hrvatskoj (coauthor, 2016)
- The Indo-European Languages (ed., 2nd edition)
- Jeziku je svejedno (coauthor, 2019)
