= Yanush Panchenko =

Ethnologist, researcher of the Roma and translator

- Януш Панченко
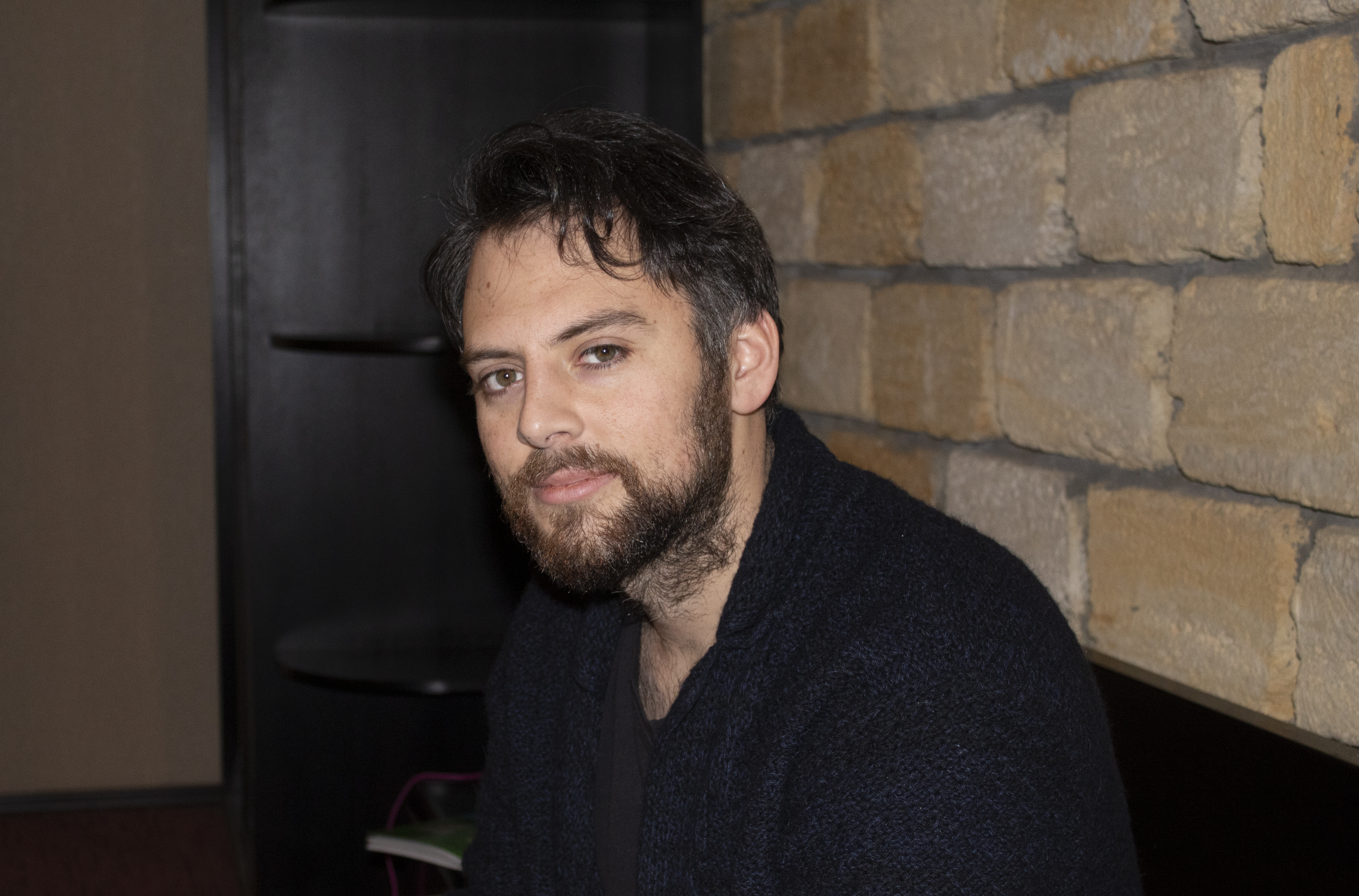
- Born: 26 June 1991 (age 35); Kherson, Ukrainian SSR
- Citizenship: Ukraine
- Education: National Aviation University (BA); Kherson State University (MA)
- Known for: Research on Ukrainian Roma; literature in the Vlaxicko dialect
- Scientific career
- Fields: Linguistics, ethnology, history
- Workplaces: Institute of Ethnology, Czech Academy of Sciences

Yanush Panchenko (Ukrainian: Януш Олександрович Панченко; born 26 June 1991; also published as Janush Panchenko) is an ethnologist, researcher of the Roma, translator and civic activist. He is a research associate at the Institute of Ethnology of the Czech Academy of Sciences. His research focuses on the Romani dialects of Ukraine and on the situation of the Romani population during the Russo-Ukrainian War. He is the founder of the civic organisation Romano Than.

== Biography ==
Panchenko was born into a mixed Vlaxurya–Servurya Romani family that had become sedentary in the first generation. The Panchenko family had led a nomadic life across southern Ukraine; after the 1956 decree of the Presidium of the Supreme Soviet of the Soviet Union "On involving in labour Gypsies engaged in vagrancy", which banned the nomadic way of life, his grandfather settled down and later moved to Kakhovka.

He graduated from the National Aviation University in 2016 with a bachelor's degree in tourism and in 2018 obtained a master's degree in history from Kherson State University. Until 2022 he worked as a social pedagogue at School No. 6 in Kakhovka.

After the start of the Russian invasion of Ukraine in 2022 he remained in occupied Kakhovka for several months before leaving for Europe. He worked as a monitor for the OSCE Office for Democratic Institutions and Human Rights, documenting violations of the rights of Roma in Ukraine during the war. He lives in Germany.

== Research ==
Since 2023 Panchenko has been a research associate at the Institute of Ethnology of the Czech Academy of Sciences.

=== Ethnography and sociology ===
As an ethnographer, Panchenko mainly studies the traditional culture of the Servurya and Vlaxurya Romani groups of Ukraine, including clothing, dwellings, nomadic life and calendar rites. In 2016–2017 he conducted an ethnosociological survey of the Romani population of Kherson Oblast, covering 1,721 respondents in 18 localities and examining group composition, language, religion, employment and education, with the results compared to the 2001 census. Before 2022 he recorded testimonies of Roma about the Romani genocide for his personal archive.

In 2023–2024 he was a fellow at Indiana University, where he studied the Crimean Roma and the Servurya as potential indigenous peoples of Ukraine.

As a research fellow at the European University Viadrina in 2026, he studied the participation of Ukrainian Roma in the Russo-Ukrainian War as members of the Armed Forces of Ukraine and the impact of the war on Romanipe, the traditional Romani value system. The study examines how the full-scale invasion is affecting Roma attitudes towards military service.

Together with Mykola Homanyuk he studied the 2022 media event in which Roma from Liubymivka seized a Russian tank, and its role in the consolidation of the Ukrainian political nation; their joint article "From a Pilfered Nail to a Stolen Tank" received an award from the Council of Europe in 2025.

=== Linguistics ===
Since 2012 Panchenko has been compiling a dictionary of the Vlaxicko dialect of Romani, spoken in Ukraine and Russia, with Mikhail Oslon as scientific editor. He headed the subgroup on the development of a Romani alphabet within the working group on the codification of the Romani language at the State Service of Ukraine for Ethnic Policy and Freedom of Conscience. Within the project "Romani language(s) in Ukraine: codification and prospects for development" run by Romano Than and supported by the State Service in 2026, he took part in field research on the Romani dialects of Ukraine; the project involved the documentation, description and mapping of these dialects.

== Civic activities ==
In 2017 Panchenko founded and headed the Romani youth organisation "Society of Gypsies of the Southern Region – Romano Than" (Товариство циган Південного краю «Романо Тган»), which works to improve access to and the quality of education for Romani teenagers in Kherson Oblast. In 2021 the organisation began creating a youth centre of the same name in Kakhovka. The project was supported by the International Renaissance Foundation and was included in its list of the 60 best initiatives of 2021. Romano Than became the first Romani youth centre in Ukraine and in the post-Soviet space. Work on the centre was completed a few days before the Russian invasion; after the occupation of Kherson Oblast the building was broken into and taken over by Russian troops. The organisation is now registered in Kharkiv and headed by Oleh Synaiuk.

In 2025 Panchenko co-founded two organisations: the Ukrainian Centre for Romani Studies at Kherson State University and the Ukrainian Roma Advocacy Alliance (AURA) in Germany. He is co-chair of both.

Since 2026 he has been the coordinator of the Romani language thematic section of the European Roma Institute for Arts and Culture (ERIAC).

From 2022 to 2025 he served on the expert councils of the Ukrainian Cultural Foundation. At the EVZ Foundation he is a member of the advisory body and of the jury of the "Latscho Diwes 2.0" programme. He organises and speaks at public events with Romani veterans of the Armed Forces of Ukraine.

== Literary work ==
Panchenko writes poems and fairy tales in the Vlaxicko dialect of Romani, for which he developed his own Cyrillic-based writing system, and translates Ukrainian and world poetry into it. He voices animated films, educational videos, audiobooks and radio plays in the dialect. He also translates Christian texts for children into Vlaxicko, including comics and K. N. Taylor's children's Bible Мэрни англуйи Библия андэ картинкэ (My First Bible in Pictures, 2025). In 2020–2021 he created audio fairy tales in Romani for the Radio Romano programme of Sveriges Radio. He co-authored the bilingual Romani textbook Adinoj taj pistroj rromanes (Read and Write Romani, 2022), which passed a quality review against criteria developed by the Ukrainian Institute of Education Development and UNICEF for use in formal and non-formal education. He promotes the Romani language through an educational blog on social media.

== Awards ==
- "Bronisława Wajs" International Competition of Literary Creation and Translation (Bucharest): second place in poetry (2019) and first place in translation into Romani (2020)
- Ronald Lee Award for contribution to the development and preservation of the Romani language (Montreal, 2023)
- Special Jury Award, Council of Europe Journalism Excellence Award (2025, with Mykola Homanyuk, for a joint article)

== Selected works ==
=== Articles ===
- Panchenko, Ya.; Kyuchukov, H.; Homanyuk, M. (2025). "Зміст, сприйняття та практики використання етнонімів роми і цигани у сучасній Україні" [Meanings, perceptions and uses of the ethnonyms Roma and Tsyhany in contemporary Ukraine]. Ekonomichna ta Sotsialna Geografiya (94): 28–52.
- Zharonkin, V.; Panchenko, J.; Danylenko, I.; Homanyuk, M. (2024). "Decline in xenophobia towards Roma in Ukraine: An analysis of recent public opinion trends". Ekonomichna ta Sotsialna Geografiya (92): 104–113.
- Panchenko, Y.; Homanyuk, M. (2023). "Servur'a and Krym'a (Crimean Roma) as indigenous peoples of Ukraine". Etnografia Polska 67 (1–2): 155–173.
- Homanyuk, M.; Panchenko, J. (2023). "From a Pilfered Nail to a Stolen Tank: The Role of a Media Event in the Consolidation of the Ukrainian Political Nation". Dossier No. 1: War, Migration and Memory. Berlin: Forum Transregionale Studien.
- Makhotina, I.; Panchenko, Ya. (2019). "Традиционный костюм цыган-сэрвов и влахов" [The traditional costume of the Servurya and Vlaxurya Roma]. Scriptorium Nostrum 1 (12): 254–267.
- Makhotina, I.; Panchenko, Ya. (2019). "Традиционное жилище и элементы неоседлого быта цыган-влахов и сэрвов" [Traditional dwellings and elements of nomadic life among the Vlaxurya and Servurya Roma]. Revista de Etnologie și Culturologie XXVI: 22–30.
- Makhotina, I.; Panchenko, Ya. (2020). "Календарная обрядность цыган-влахов и сэрвов во второй половине XX — начале XXI века" [Calendar rites of the Vlaxurya and Servurya Roma in the second half of the 20th and early 21st centuries]. Revista de Etnologie și Culturologie XXVII: 54–64.

=== Book chapters ===
- Zharonkin, V.; Panchenko, J.; Homanyuk, M. (2024). "Ukrainian Roma: Facing the challenges of the Russian-Ukrainian war and displacement". In Muratova, E.; Zasanska, N. (eds.). Minorities at War: Cultural Identity and Resilience in Ukraine. London: Routledge. pp. 262–287.
- Chernykh, A.; Kozhanov, K.; Tsvetkov, G.; Makhotina, I.; Panchenko, Ya. (2018). "Календарные праздники и обряды; Одежда" [Calendar festivals and rites; Clothing]. In Demeter, N.; Chernykh, A. (eds.). Цыгане [The Roma]. Series "Peoples and Cultures", chapters 6 and 9. Moscow: Institute of Ethnology and Anthropology, Russian Academy of Sciences.

=== Textbooks ===
- Panchenko, Ya.; Makhotina, I.; Dorokhmanov, M. (2022). Адіной тай пістрой рроманес [Read and Write Romani]. Dnipro: Seredniak T. K. 36 pp. Passed a quality review against criteria of the Ukrainian Institute of Education Development and UNICEF. (Ukrainian edition), (Russian edition).
- Dorokhmanov, N.; Panchenko, Ya.; Makhotina, I. (2020). Чити ай скрии рроманес [Read and Write Romani]. Dnipro: Seredniak T. K. 34 pp. Version of the textbook in the Kishinev dialect.
