= Ivan Uzhevych =

Ruthenian grammarian

Ivan Petrovych Uzhevych (born 1610s, perhaps North Volhynia – after 1645) was a Ruthenian grammarian.

Very little is known about his biography: From 1637 he studied at Cracow University, then in 1643 he was a student of theology at the Sorbonne, Paris. He wrote a Polish ode on the occasion of the marriage of a certain Aleksander Przyłęcki with Ewa Rupniowa, which was printed in 1641. Uzhevych is well known to East Slavic language historians as the author of the first grammar of the Ruthenian language.

He wrote his name Іωаннъ Ужевичъ Словянинъ (Ioann Uzhevych Slovyanyn), Ioannes Usevicius Sclavonus, Ioannes Ugevicius Sclavonus, Jan Użewic; in the student register of Cracow University he is written Ioannes Petri Uzewicz d. Vil., but is today best known as: Belarusian: Іван Ужэвіч (Ivan Uzhevich), Polish: Jan Użewicz, Ukrainian: Іва́н Петро́вич Уже́вич (Ivan Uzhevych).

== Life ==
Very little is known about his biography: From 1637 he studied at Cracow University, then in 1643 he was a student of theology at the Sorbonne, writing is indicated on the cover page.

== The Grammatica sclavonica ==
Two manuscripts are known of Ivan Uzhevych’s Grammatica sclavonica, written in Latin: The Paris manuscript from 1643 and the Arras manuscript from 1645, called so because of the place it is kept now; no place of writing is indicated on the cover page. Both have been published in a scholarly edition in 1970. Uzhevych’s work, which seems to be influenced by the Polish grammar Polonicae grammatices institutio (1568) by Piotr Stojeński (Petrus Statorius) and by Meletius Smotrytsky’s Church Slavonic grammar Gramatiki slavenskija pravilnoje syntagma (1619), is the only grammar known of the Ruthenian language of the sixteenth and seventeenth centuries, the predecessor of modern Ukrainian and Belarusian, which the author calls lingua popularis, “vulgar tongue”. It is the first grammar of an East Slavic language (and not of Church Slavonic, which Uzhevych calls lingua sacra, “sacred tongue”).

Both Belarusian and Ukrainian linguistics have been trying to show that Uzhevych's grammar belongs to the history of their respective language and not the other one. Thus, Ivan Bilodid (1972), Mykhaylo Zhovtobryukh (1976), and Vasyl Nimchuk (1985) have stressed Ukrainian features of his language, whereas Aleksandr Sobolevskiy (1906), Vatroslav Jagić (1907), James Dingley (1972) and Yuriy Shevelov (1979) have pointed out its Belarusian aspects. Olexa Horbatsch (1967) assumes that Uzhevych came from the modern Ukrainian-Belarusian borderlands, which at that time, of course, were not a borderland at all. Uzhevych's grammar includes a lot of parallel forms that have later been incorporated into either the modern Belarusian or the modern Ukrainian language. For example, for ‘what’ both що (ščo), as in modern Ukrainian, and што (što), as in modern Belarusian, appear. This shows that Uzhevych's intention was to describe not his own dialect but a common, partially standardized, Ruthenian language (cf. History of the East Slavic languages).

Uzhevych's grammar exhibits a distinctly comparative approach. It is probably not a coincidence that its title is Grammatica sclavonica, not ruthenica. Much of what is written about Ruthenian seems to be meant for Church Slavonic, too, and where the two languages differ, Uzhevych often includes specific information on Church Slavonic. Apart from that, he comments on differences in Polish, Czech, Moravian, and Croatian, citing, for example, the Lord's Prayer in Church Slavonic, Ruthenian, and Croatian (in the Glagolitic alphabet).

As usual at that time, the grammar shows the difficulties of superimposing the Latin grammatical system on a very different language. Thus, on the one hand there are long lists of constructed verb forms that are of no practical relevance for Ruthenian, e.g. the optative pluperfect бодай бымъ былъ ковáлъ (bodaj bym” byl” koval”) ‘oh would I have had cooked!’ (Arras, 45_{2}), but on the other hand the locative case is not reflected, and Uzhevych tries to explain the respective endings, which sometimes resemble the dative, sometimes the instrumental (ablative) endings, as casus vagabundi, “wandering cases” (Arras, 33_{2}-34_{1}).

== Rozmova · Besěda ==
As Helmut Keipert (2001) has shown, the anonymous and undated manuscript titled Rozmova and Besěda (which linguists so far wrongly attributed to the end of the 16th century) is also an autograph by Ivan Uzhevych. Just like the first of the manuscripts of Uzhevych's grammar, it is now kept in the French National Library at Paris. The manuscript is a parallel translation of the popular phrasebook by Noël de Berlaimont into Ruthenian and Church Slavonic. The left, Ruthenian column of each page (the Rozmova part) is titled “Popularis”, and the right, Church Slavonic one (the Besěda part) “Sacra”. Maybe the author wanted to demonstrate in practice the differences described in his grammar between the “vulgar” and the “sacred” tongue. Anyway, this phrasebook provides a lot of linguistic material to fill the gaps in the Grammatica sclavonica, which itself contains only little actual Ruthenian text, as it is written in Latin. Apart from that, the phrasebook consists of very straightforward, colloquial, every-day dialogues — those that made Berlaimont's work the most popular phrasebook of all times. It was reprinted more than 150 times all over Europe between the beginning of the 16th and the end of the 19th century in versions with from two to eight language columns.

The manuscript was published in a scholarly edition in 2005 together with the Latin original from 1613 and a translation of the same text into Polish from a print of 1646.

== Works ==
- Obraz cnoty y sławy w przezacney fámiliey Ich MM. PP. Przyłęckich, wiecznemi czásy nieodmiennie trwájący. Ná wesoło fortunny akt małżeński przezacnych małżonkow Jego Mośći P. Alexandra z Przyłęka Przyłęckiego, y Jey Mośći Panny Ewy z Rupniowa Rupniowskiey, Aońskim piorem odrysowány y ná ućiechę nowemu Stadłu ofiarowány przez Jana Użewica sławney Akademiey Krákowskiey Studenta (Kraków 1641).
- Grammatica sclavonica (Paris 1643; probably Paris 1645).
- Rozmova · Besěda (probably Paris, middle of 17th century; ISBN 3-87690-892-2).
