= Boris Uspenskij =

Russian linguist, philologist, semiotician, historian of culture

- Бори́с Андре́евич Успе́нский
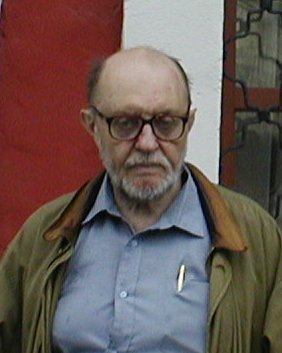
- Born: 1 March 1937 (age 89); Moscow, Russian Soviet Federative Socialist Republic, Soviet Union
- Education: Moscow State University
- Known for: linguist, philologist, semiotician, historian of culture
- Scientific career
- Fields: linguistics, semiotics, philology, history of culture
- Workplaces: National Research University – Higher School of Economics, Russian State University for the Humanities

Boris Andreevich Uspenskij (Russian: Бори́с Андре́евич Успе́нский) (born 1937, in Moscow) is a Russian linguist, philologist, semiotician, and historian of culture.

== Biography ==
Uspenskij graduated from Moscow University in 1960. He delivered lectures in Moscow until 1982, but later moved on to work in Harvard University, Cornell University, Vienna University, and the University of Graz. Full professor of Russian literature at the Naples Eastern University, he was elected to many scholarly societies and academies of Europe.

Uspenskij worked with Juri Lotman and was influenced by his ideas as a member of Tartu-Moscow semiotics school. His major works include Linguistic Situation in Kievan Rus and Its Importance for the Study of the Russian Literary Language, Philological Studies in the Sphere of Slavonic Antiquities, and The Principles of Structural Typology.

Uspenskij is well known in the study of icons for his work The Semiotics of the Russian Icon (Lisse, 1976), among others.

Uspenskij is the member of the editorial boards of the following academic journals: Sign Systems Studies, Arbor Mundi (Moscow), Zbornik Matice srpske za slavistiku (Novi Sad), and Slověne. International Journal of Slavic Studies.

== Fellowships, grants, awards ==
- 1989 British Academy (London)
- 1992-1993 Wissenschaftskolleg zu Berlin (Institute for Advanced Studies, Berlin)
- 1993 The Warburg Institute (London)
- 1999 Swedish Collegium for Advanced Study (Uppsala)
- 2007 Early Slavic Studies Association Annual Distinguished Scholarship Award

== Memberships of associations, honorary titles ==
- Doctor honoris causa, Russian State University for the Humanities, Moscow (2001)
- Doctor honoris causa, Konstantin Preslavsky University, Shumen (2003)
- Doctor honoris causa, Belgrade University (2010)
- Doctor honoris causa, Tallinn University (2016)
- Member, Academia Europaea (London) since 1990
- Foreign Member, Austrian Academy of Sciences (Österreichische Akademie der Wissenschaften) (Vienna) since 1987
- Foreign Member, Norwegian Academy of Science and Letters (Oslo) since 1999
- Foreign Member, Polish Academy of Arts and Sciences (Polska Akademia Umiejętności) (Kraków) since 2011
- Honorary Member, Slavonic and East European Medieval Studies Group (Oxford - Cambridge) since 1987
- Honorary Member, Early Slavic Studies Association (U.S.A.)
- Honorary Member, Association internationale de sémiologie de l’image (Paris) since 1991
- Member, Honorary Committee of the American Friends of the Warburg Institute (London) since 1993
- Member, International Association for Semiotic Studies (Bloomington) since 1976
- Member, Russian Pen-Center (Moscow) since 1994
- Member, Kungl. Humanistiska Vetenskapssamfundet i Lund (Société Royale des Lettres de Lund) since 1996
- Member ("Socio ordinario"), Società Filologica Romana (Rome) since 2001
- Member of Comitato scientifico of the journal Russica Romana

== Publications ==
Author of 550 publications in the fields of general linguistics, philology, semiotics, slavistics, history. Author of the following books:

- Principles of Structural Typology. Moscow 1962 (in Russian). English translation: The Hague - Paris 1968.
- Structural Typology of Languages. Moscow 1965 (in Russian).
- The Archaic System of Church-Slavonic Pronunciation. Moscow 1968 (in Russian).
- Towards a History of Church-Slavonic Proper Names in Russia. Moscow 1969 (in Russian).
- Poetics of Composition. Moscow 1970; St. Petersburg 2002 (in Russian). English translation: Berkeley - Los Angeles - London 1973 (paper-back edition 1982). German translation: Frankfurt 1976. Also translated into Japanese, Chinese, Korean, Polish, Czech, Serbian, Slovenian, Bulgarian, Hungarian, Finnish, Hebrew.
- The First Russian Grammar in the Native Language. Moscow 1975 (in Russian).
- Tipologia della cultura. Milano 19751, 1987 (paper-back edition, 1995). Joint publication with J. M. Lotman.
- Semiotica della cultura. Milano-Napoli 1975. Joint publication with Yu.M. Lotman.
- The Semiotics of the Russian Icon. Lisse/The Netherlands 1976. Also translated into Japanese, Italian, Serbian, Slovenian, Bulgarian.
- Philological Investigation of Slavic Antiquities. Moscow 1982 (in Russian). Also translated into Polish.
- The Linguistic Situation in Kievan Rus´ and its Significance for the History of the Russian Literary Language. Moscow 1983 (in Russian). Also translated into Italian.
- The Semiotics of Russian Culture. Ann Arbor 1984. Joint publication with J. M. Lotman.
- The Semiotics of Russian Cultural History. Ithaca 1985. Joint publication with Yu. M. Lotman and L. Ja. Ginsburg.
- Towards a History of the Russian Literary Language of XVIII - early XIX centuries. Moscow 1985 (in Russian).
- The History of the Russian Literary Language (XI - XVII centuries). München 1987, Budapest 1982, Moscow 2002 (in Russian).
- Jean Sohier. Grammaire et Methode Russes et Françoises 1724. Bd. I-II. München 1987.
- Storia e semiotica. Milano 1988.
- Sémiotique de la culture russe. Lausanne 1990. Joint publication with J. M. Lotman.
- Semiotik der Geschichte. Wien, 1991.
- Tsar and God. Warszawa 1992 (in Polish). Joint publication with V. M. Živov.
- Selected Works, vol. I-II. Sofia 1992-2000 (in Bulgarian).
- Storia della lingua letteraria russa: Dall’antica Rus’ a Puškin. Bologna 1993.
- Johann Ernst Glück. Grammatik der russischen Sprache (1704). Köln - Weimar - Wien 1994. Joint publication with Helmut Keipert and Viktor Zhivov.
- Semiotics of Art. Moscow 1995 (in Russian).
- Linguistica, semiotica, storia della cultura. Bologna 1996.
- Selected Works, vol. I-III. 2d edition, revised and expanded. Moscow 1996-1997 (in Russian).
- Tsar and Patriarch. Moscow, 1998 (in Russian). Also translated into Polish.
- Historia i semiotyka. Gdańsk 1998 (in Polish).
- Tsar and Emperor. Moscow, 2000 (in Russian). Italian version: "In regem unxit": Unzione al trono e semantica dei titoli del sovrano. Napoli 2001. Also translated into Polish.
- Boris and Gleb: The Perception of History in Old Rus’. Moscow 1998 (in Russian).
- Religia i semiotyka. Gdańsk, 2001 (in Polish).
- Studies in Russian History. Saint Petersburg, 2002 (in Russian).
- The Sign of the Cross and Sacred Space. Moscow, 2004 (in Russian). Also translated into Italian.
- Part and Whole in Russian Grammar. Moscow, 2004 (in Russian).
- Essays in History and Philology. Moscow, 2004 (in Russian).
- Cross and Circle: From the History of the Christian Symbolism. Moscow, 2006 (in Russian). Also translated into Polish.
- Ego loquens: Language and Communicational Space. Moscow, 2007; Moscow, 2012 (in Russian). Also translated into Serbian.
- Works on Trediakovskij. Moscow, 2008 (in Russian).
- The Ghent Altarpiece of Jan van Eyck: the composition (Divine and Homan Perspective). Moscow, 2009; Moscow, 2013 (in Russian). Italian version: Prospettiva divina e prospettiva umana: La pala di van Eyck a Gand. Milano, 2010.
- “Tsar and God” and Other Essays in Russian Cultural Semiotics. Boston, 2012. Joint publication with V. M. Živov.
- Veni kultuuri jõujooni: Valik artikleid. Tartu, 2013.
