= Mikhail Oslon =

- Михаил Ослон
- Born: 5 August 1979 (age 47); Tula, Soviet Union
- Education: University of Toronto; Russian State University for the Humanities
- Known for: Research on Romani dialects
- Scientific career
- Fields: Linguistics
- Institutions: Institute of Polish Language, Polish Academy of Sciences
- Doctoral advisor: Vladimir Dybo
- Website: rromanes.org/oslon

Mikhail Oslon (Russian: Михаил Ослон; born 5 August 1979 in Tula) is a linguist specialising in the Romani language and Balto-Slavic accentology. He holds a habilitation and works as a researcher at the Institute of Polish Language of the Polish Academy of Sciences.

Oslon is the author of a grammar of the Kelderash dialect, described in a review as the most extensive grammatical description of Romani to date, as well as of several dozen scholarly articles and linguistic maps. He is one of the editors of the Encyclopedia of Slavic Languages and Linguistics (Brill), whose editor-in-chief is Marc L. Greenberg.

== Biography ==
Oslon was born in Tula and moved to Toronto as a teenager, where he received his higher education at the University of Toronto. In 2009 he defended a dissertation on the accentual system of the language of Juraj Križanić, supervised by Vladimir Dybo, with Andrey Zaliznyak and I. B. Itkin as opponents, and obtained a Candidate of Sciences degree in philology from the Russian State University for the Humanities.

From 2009 to 2013 he worked at the Institute for Slavic Studies of the Russian Academy of Sciences. For a year and a half he lived next to a Kelderash Romani settlement in the village of Plekhanovo near Tula, one of the largest Kelderash settlements in Russia, studying the community's language and everyday life; he commented as a specialist on the demolition of houses in the settlement in 2016.

In 2013 he moved to Lviv, Ukraine, where he studied Romani dialects spoken in the country. During this period he created Rromanes, an online resource devoted to the study of Romani dialects in Ukraine. Since 2020 he has lived in Kraków, where he obtained his habilitation at the Institute of Polish Language of the Polish Academy of Sciences and works as a research fellow. With Kirill Kozhanov he is preparing the first comprehensive etymological dictionary of Romani.

His research interests include the Slavic and Baltic languages, Romani dialects (particularly Kelderash), etymology, accentology and Indology.

== Reception ==
Krzysztof Stroński, reviewing Oslon's work in the habilitation procedure, called the monograph outstanding and unique on a global scale, noting in particular its documentary value and arguing that it should be translated into English and published by a press that would ensure its international circulation.

Axel Holvoet singled out Oslon's article on the reflex of the Old Indo-Aryan neuter in Romani, in which the author argues that the ambiguous plural form of masculine nouns continues an older gender distinction lost in a number of Indo-Aryan languages; Holvoet described this as an evidently important discovery.

Tomasz Wicherkiewicz, head of the research laboratory for language policy and the study of smaller language communities at Adam Mickiewicz University in Poznań, described the Kelderash grammar as complete and exemplary, suggesting it could serve as a model for the grammatical description of a language variety in linguistics teaching; he considered the publication's Russian language of issue its main drawback.

Frederik Kortlandt was critical of Oslon's article on the distribution of the diphthongs ei and ie in Lithuanian, describing it as an instance of uncritically applying a method of assigning dominant patterns to sequences of morphemes and extrapolating them without regard for the phonetic and analogical developments that produced later accentual systems, or for their relative chronology.

Viktor Elšík called the grammar excellent, well researched, well written and well structured, noting that it covers many topics, especially in syntax, not previously described in any grammar or specialised study of Romani, and that it should become a model for Romani grammaticography.

== Selected publications ==
=== Books ===
- Oslon, Mikhail (2018). Язык котляров-молдовая. Грамматика кэлдэрарского диалекта цыганского языка в русскоязычном окружении [The language of the Moldovaya Kelderash: A grammar of the Kelderash dialect of Romani in a Russian-speaking environment]. Moscow: YaSK. 952 pp.
- Oslon, Mikhail; Kozhanov, Kirill. Этимологический словарь цыганского языка [Etymological dictionary of Romani]. In preparation.

=== Articles ===
- Oslon, Mikhail (2025). "The position of Romani in Indo-Aryan revisited". Romani Studies 35 (1): 1–32.
- Oslon, Mikhail (2023). "Ещё к вопросу о происхождении литовских инессива и иллатива" [More on the origin of the Lithuanian inessive and illative]. In Nikolaev, S. L. (ed.). Славянское и балканское языкознание 23. Moscow: Institute of Slavic Studies.
- Oslon, Mikhail (2022). "Reconstruction of Proto-Romani demonstratives". Romani Studies 32 (2): 151–184.
- Oslon, Mikhail (2021). "Ещё один довод в пользу восходящего контура праславянского старого акута" [Another argument for the rising contour of the Proto-Slavic old acute]. Jezikoslovni zapiski 27 (1): 203–211.
- Oslon, Mikhail; Glagoleva, Olga (2021). "Болотов и другие: произношение фамилий в XVIII веке" [Bolotov and others: the pronunciation of surnames in the 18th century]. In Glagoleva, O. E.; Schierle, I. (eds.). Культура и быт дворянства в провинциальной России XVIII в., vol. 1. Moscow: Politicheskaya entsiklopediya. pp. 242–252.
- Oslon, Mikhail; Kapović, Mate (2019). "Удлинение гласных в говоре Юрия Крижанича в сопоставлении с чакавскими и кайкавскими данными" [Vowel lengthening in Juraj Križanić's dialect compared with Chakavian and Kajkavian data]. Славянское и балканское языкознание. Moscow: Institute of Slavic Studies.
- Oslon, Mikhail; Bolotov, Sergei (2019). "«Правило Лескина–Отрембского–Смочиньского» и мнимые исключения из закона де Соссюра" [The "Leskien–Otrębski–Smoczyński rule" and apparent exceptions to Saussure's law]. Балто-славянские исследования 20: 55–91.
- Oslon, Mikhail (2018). "Отражение южнославянского *r в заимствованиях из старорумынского в цыганский" [The reflex of South Slavic *r in Old Romanian loanwords in Romani]. Journal of Language Relationship 16 (1).
- Oslon, Mikhail (2017). "Jek puśimos la istorijaka fonetikako la kêldêraricko śibaki". In Kozhanov, Kirill; Oslon, Mikhail; Halwachs, Dieter W. (eds.). Das amen godi pala Lev Čerenkov. Romani historija, čhib taj kultura. Graz: GLM. pp. 325–338.
- Oslon, Mikhail (2017). "К описанию ударения старых полонизмов в украинском языке" [Towards a description of the stress of old Polonisms in Ukrainian]. Памяти В. М. Иллич-Свитыча: материалы круглого стола. Moscow: Institute of Slavic Studies.
- Oslon, Mikhail (2014). "О неким особинама ромског нагласног система" [On some features of the Romani accentual system]. Славистички зборник, new series, vol. 1. Novi Sad. pp. 293–315.
- Oslon, Mikhail (2012). "Отражение древнеиндийского среднего рода в цыганском" [The reflex of the Old Indo-Aryan neuter in Romani]. Journal of Language Relationship 8 (1): 93–102.
- Oslon, Mikhail (2012). "Über den Silbenakzent in Juraj Križanićs Dialekt". Slověne (2): 66–80.
- Oslon, Mikhail (2011). "Распределение дифтонгов ei ~ ie в литовском языке" [The distribution of the diphthongs ei and ie in Lithuanian]. Baltistica VII priedas: 133–170.

=== Popular science ===
- Oslon, Mikhail (9 November 2016). "Радость говорить по-украински" [The joy of speaking Ukrainian]. Snob.
