= Nikolay Popovsky =

Russian poet

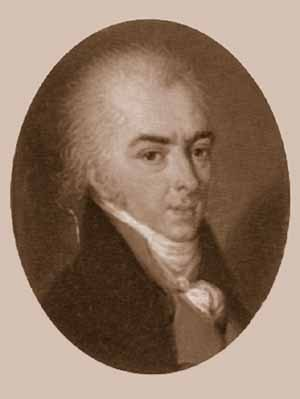

Nikolay Nikitich Popovsky (Russian: Николай Никитич Поповский) (1730?- 13 February 1760) was a Russian poet and protégé of Mikhail Lomonosov. Son of a priest serving at Saint Basil's Cathedral in Moscow, in 1748 he was chosen by Vasily Trediakovsky at Lomonosov's behest amongst ten students from the Moscow Slavyano-Greko-Latin Academy to be enrolled in the university attached to the Academy of Sciences. While still a student at the university, he translated Horace's Ars Poetica into Russian verse, whereas Trediakovsky had produced only a prose rendition. The Horace translation, including the odes, was published by the Academy of Sciences in 1753. In 1753 at Lomonosov's suggestion he translated the first part of Alexander Pope's "Essay on Man" from a French version; publication was delayed until 1757 due to opposition by the Russian Orthodox church. He wrote an ode in honour of Empress Elizabeth's ascension to the Russian throne (1754), and another in the name of Moscow University for her coronation (1756). His poem in honour of Elizabeth on the occasion of the New Year's fireworks display of 1755, at one time thought to have been written by Lomonosov, is in fact a translation of Jacob Stahlin's poem "Verse an Ihre Kayserliche Majestät unsere grosse und huldreichste Monarchin gerichtet worden".

Sponsored by Lomonosov, Popovsky in 1755 became rector of the University Gymnasium in Moscow; in his inaugural address, "On the Content, Significance, and Scope of Philosophy" he championed conducting lectures on the subject in Russian rather than Latin, a proposal which Moscow University eventually put into practice twelve years later.
