= Vladimir Uspensky =

Russian mathematician

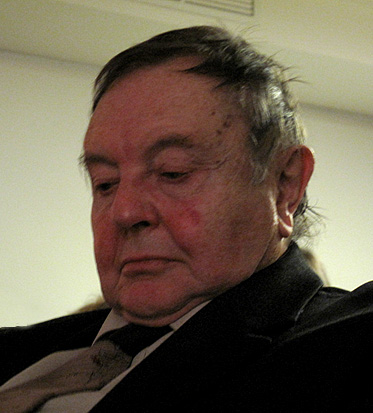
- Born: 27 November 1930; Moscow, Russian SSR, Soviet Union
- Died: 27 June 2018 (aged 87); Moscow, Russia
- Other names: Vladimir Uspensky, Uspenski, Uspenskii, Uspenskij, Ouspenski, Uspenskiy

Academic work
- Main interests: Foundations of mathematics, mathematical logic, computability theory, mathematical linguistics

Vladimir Andreyevich Uspensky (Russian: Влади́мир Андре́евич Успе́нский; 27 November 1930 – 27 June 2018) was a Russian mathematician, linguist, writer, doctor of physics and mathematics (1964). He was the author of numerous papers on mathematical logic and linguistics. In addition, he also penned a number of memoir essays. Uspensky initiated a reform of linguistic education in Russia.

== Biography ==
Uspensky graduated in 1952 from the MSU Faculty of Mechanics and Mathematics (Lomonosov Moscow State University). He was a student of Andrey Kolmogorov. He was the head of the Chair of Mathematical Logic and Theory of Algorithms in the MSU Faculty of Mechanics and Mathematics (1995) and one of the founders of the Structural Linguistics branch (now the Theoretical and Applied Linguistics branch) in the MSU Faculty of Philology, where he also taught. He was the author of many books and of over 100 research papers. He prepared 25 candidates and 4 doctors of sciences. His book "The Apology of Mathematics" received in 2010 the “Enlightener" award in the field of natural and exact sciences. He was a distinguished professor at the Moscow State University (1998). His brother Boris Uspenskij is a distinguished Russian philologist and mythographer.
