= Claude Frioux =

French academic, university teacher and translator

Claude Frioux (12 January 1932 – April 17, 2017) was a French academic specializing in Russia.

A Normalien, agrégé de russe, sovietologist, he was a lecturer at the faculté de lettres de Rennes before becoming professor emeritus at the Université de Paris VIII (« Vincennes à Saint-Denis ») which he chaired from its inception in 1971 until 1976 and from 1981 to 1986. He has often led translation projects, especially with Elsa Triolet on Anton Chekhov and his wife Irène Sokologorsky. As a translator, he has worked on about thirty books and is best known as the reference translator for the poet Vladimir Mayakovsky.

== Selected bibliography ==
- 2008: Trois correspondances, Paris, L'Harmattan. ISBN 978-2-296-05243-7
- 1969: Vladimir Maïakovski, Lettres à Lili Brik (1917-1930), trans. Andrée Robel, presentation by Claude Frioux, Éditions Gallimard
- 1984: Vladimir Maïakovski, Poèmes 1913-1917, trans. Claude Frioux, Messidor
- 1985: Vladimir Maïakovski, Poèmes 1918-1921, trans. Claude Frioux, Messidor
- 1986: Vladimir Maïakovski, Poèmes 1922-1923, trans. Claude Frioux, Messidor
- 1987: Vladimir Maïakovski, Poèmes 1924-1930, trans. Claude Frioux, Messidor
- Vie et œuvre de Youri Solntsev, Paris, L'Harmattan, series "Poètes des cinq continents"
- L'URSS et nous (dir.), Les Éditions sociales, Paris.
- 1961: Maïakovski par lui-même, Éditions du Seuil, series "Écrivains de toujours", Paris
- Tchekhov Anton, Œuvres : Introduction, chronologie et table alphabétique des récits dans les trois tomes. Gallimard, series Bibliothèque de la Pléiade.
