= Grammatical aspect in the Slavic languages =

All Slavic languages distinguish between at least two kinds of grammatical aspect: the imperfective aspect and the perfective aspect. While usage varies between languages, imperfective forms are typically used to signify incomplete actions, actions which occur regularly, or actions still in progress. By contrast, the perfective is commonly used to express completeness or totality, and often contextualizes an action within a specific point in time and space. The use of one aspect over another in certain contexts can connote a certain level of politeness. Aspectual pairs are typically formed using imperfectivizing suffixes or perfectivizing prefixes, though alternations in vowel quality, vowel length, or stress may also be used. Some verbs, especially loanwords, may perform the grammatical role of both aspects, though some languages deal with the ambiguity by applying a perfectivizing prefix or an imperfectivizing suffix to the word in order to give it a clearer grammatical role in the sentence.

The development of the Slavic aspectual system dates back to Proto-Slavic, the most recent common ancestor of the Slavic languages, during which aspect overtook grammatical tense's importance in verbal constructions. Although the ancestral Proto-Indo-European language also marked for aspect, it has a much more robust and central role in the Slavic languages. Over time, a system of affixation mostly replaced the inherited Proto-Indo-European system, though features persist mainly in some South Slavic languages. The exact origin of the affixation system is the subject of scholarly debate, but it appears that a major development was the semantic bleaching of certain spacial prefixes. These prefixes once had a strict semantic role, usually signifying some sort of spacial relationship such as "away from" or "with", but overuse in certain contexts caused the prefixes to be reanalyzed as serving a grammatical rather than semantic function.

Although derived from a common system, usage of aspect among the Slavic languages varies considerably. Linguists have categorized usage using an East–West isogloss to distinguish them, though the system is not based on any phylogenetic relationship; in other words, the division among these languages is not based on an internal subfamilial relationship, but similar developments which evolved in parallel. The East Slavic languages and Bulgarian comprise the Eastern group, while Czech, Slovak, Slovene, and the Sorbian languages make up the Western group. Both Polish and Serbo-Croatian defy strict categorization into either group and are treated as transitional varieties, though Polish leans east in its usage and Serbo-Croatian leans westward. Macedonian occupies a unique position, either as a particularly divergent form of the Eastern group or as a transitional language which leans further eastward than Polish.

== Context ==
=== Slavic languages ===
A map showing the Slavic national language varieties by subfamily East Slavic languages West Slavic languages South Slavic languages

The Slavic languages, sometimes known as the Slavonic languages, are a subfamily of the larger Indo-European language family. Collectively, they are most closely related to the Baltic languages, best known among them being Lithuanian and Latvian. The Slavic languages descend from a common ancestral language known as Proto-Slavic. This ancestor experienced internal linguistic fragmentation during the early centuries AD and is generally considered to have diverged around 800 AD when the dialects were no longer fully mutually intelligible with one another, though the languages still retain a level of mutual intelligibility even today.

Within the larger Slavic language family, there are three major subdivisions: East Slavic, West Slavic, and South Slavic. East Slavic makes up the vast majority of speakers and includes Russian, Ukrainian, and Belarusian. The West Slavic branch is composed of languages such as Polish, Czech, and Slovak. South Slavic, the smallest group, comprises Serbo-Croatian – including its localized national varieties of Bosnian, Croatian, Serbian, and Montenegrin – as well as Bulgarian, Macedonian, and Slovene. The historical Old Church Slavonic is also a part of the South Slavic subfamily; it remains in use as a liturgical language in some varieties of Eastern Christian worship, mostly through the various Eastern Orthodox churches.

=== Grammatical aspect ===
Grammatical aspect expresses the internal, temporal structure of a verb. It contrasts with grammatical tense which only expresses the time in which an event took place relative to a deictic center, typically centered around the speech act. All Slavic languages distinguish between grammatical aspects. The term first appeared in English around 1853 to describe the function in the Slavic languages as distinct from other Western studies of grammar. The term itself is a calque, or loan translation, from the Russian word вид (vid; 'grammatical aspect', also 'sight, view').

== General characteristics ==
All Slavic languages distinguish between a core dichotomy of imperfective and perfective aspects. This dichotomy is present in almost all verbs and their nominalizations. The perfective is used to describe actions or states which are considered "complete, completed, total, or unified, or with a reference to a specific location in space and time, or to the completion of a specific goal". By contrast, imperfective forms describe those "which are incomplete, still in progress, repeated or habitual". Aspectual systems throughout the Slavic language family differ; the South Slavic languages are generally considered to have the most complex aspectual systems.

Certain kinds of adverbs and semantic domains tend to prefer one form or another. For example, adverbs meaning "at once" or punctual verbs such as "to kill" are associated with the perfective. In general, the perfective form is considered the marked form; the imperfective is typically used if an action is not explicitly designated as "completed". In West and East Slavic, present-tense inflections on perfective verbs are used to indicate a future tense. In the South Slavic language Serbo-Croatian, for example, the term dođem ('I [often] come') contrasts with its East Slavic Russian counterpart дойду (dojdu, 'I will reach').

=== Formation ===
In general, Slavic verbal vocabularies are composed of aspectual pairs, where two words share a lexical definition, but differ in their grammatical aspect. The formation of perfective–imperfective pairs is based on two processes. Perfectives are typically based on the addition of a perfectivizing prefix, a prefix added to a root imperfective simplex verb – that is, an unaffixed root verb which expresses an imperfective function – in order to form its perfective counterpart. In general, simplex verbs tend to be imperfective and atelic, meaning they do not have a clear endpoint in time. Examples of this include the imperfective Russian simplex verb писать (pisat', 'to write') and its perfective counterpart написать (napisat', 'to write'). Typically, perfective simplex verbs express punctual or bounded events. If a perfective verb already contains a prefix which changes its meaning outside of its aspect, a suffix may be used instead to imperfectivize it. For example, the Russian verb составить (sostavit', 'to constitute, to compose') is imperfectivized as составлять (sostavljat', 'to constitute, to compose'). The latter approach is much more common, accounting for about sixty-four percent of all perfective–imperfective pairs.

Alternations may also occur as a result of a change in aspect in lieu of a prefix; these alternations may include changes in vowel quality (including deletion), vowel length, and stress. Not all verbs have matching pairs, however; some imperfectives may not have a strictly perfective equivalent and vice versa. Examples include Ukrainian коштувати (koštuvaty, 'to cost'), which has no perfective counterpart, and збагнути (zbahnuty, 'to grasp'), which has no imperfective equivalent. In some rare cases, pairs may also exist through suppletion. Examples include Serbo-Croatian perfective reći against its imperfective counterpart govoriti, and prići ('to approach') against prilaziti. A handful of other pairs are formed through changes in stress, as in the Ukrainian imperfective засипа́ти (zasypáty, 'to fill in') with stress on the third syllable, as compared with its perfective counterpart заси́пати (zasýpaty) with stress on the second.

The application of perfectivizing prefixes has also led to alternative or specialized forms. For example, the Ukrainian verb арештувати (areštuvaty, 'to arrest') was perfectivized to зааресштувати (zaareštuvaty) with the prefix за- (za-), but the perfectivized form has been re-imperfectivized as заарештовувати (zaareštovuvaty) with the suffix -ов (-ov). Similarly, Russian verbs have taken on more complex semantic functions with affixal stacking. The base first-person singular forms лью (l'ju, 'I pour') and лил (lil, 'I poured') contrast with the perfectivized forms вылью (vyl'ju, 'I [will] pour') and вылил (vylil, 'I poured out'), respectively; these forms are further complexified by reimperfectivizing suffixes: выливаю (vylivaju) and выливал (vylival), both meaning 'I poured out' as matched with the previous respective pair.

The first objective method for determining aspectual pairs was devised by the Soviet linguist Yuri Maslov for Russian. Departing from the morphological view of Alexey Shakhmatov, Maslov recognized that narrative structures could be told either as a perfective past tense, as in Иван встретил Петра (Ivan vstretil Petra, 'John met Peter'), or as an imperfective historical present, as in Иван встречает Петра (Ivan vstrechaet Petra, 'John is meeting Peter'). This process, known as Maslov's criterion, can establish pairs based on this difference in usage rather than on the morphological derivation. The British scholar of Russian James Forsyth, however, criticized Maslov's view, arguing that it was not consistent with language use in Russian. Instead, he argued for a test, known as Forsyth's modal test, based on the use of imperatives, which tend to be perfective, as in Прочитай это письмо (Prochitaj eto pis'mo; 'Read that letter'), unless they are negative imperatives, as in Не читай это письмо (Ne chitaj eto pis'mo; 'Don't read that letter'). Forsyth's modal test has similarly been criticized for being contrary to actual language use, though it can serve as another prong in pair testing.

=== Imperatives ===
Imperatives are found using both perfective and imperfective forms, though the use of one or the other semantically is somewhat variable. In general, non-negative imperfective usage may indicate politeness, though it may also indicate vulgarity and urgency as well. Perfective usage may show completion, as in other verbal constructions, but may be rudely abrupt or more neutrally polite. In Russian, for example, the perfective form сядь (sjad', 'sit down!') contrasts with the imperfective садись (sadis', 'be seated!'). In Czech, the use of perfective imperatives tend to express a lack of agency by the subject over the outcome, such as getting a cold.

Sociolinguistic considerations may also be involved. The Russian perfective form, for example, implies a kind of social distance, giving a neutral tone in terms of politeness in formal contexts; the imperfective, by being less distant, can be perceived as extremely polite or extremely rude depending on context. For example, when the speaker is in a position to grant permission, the imperfective form of 'to open' can signal begrudging acquiescence by itself or strong encouragement with an adverb like конечно (konechno, 'of course'). Conversely, its perfective counterpart can signal neutral acquiescence or mild encouragement. Russian, however, is unique in this way; no other Slavic language allows the imperfective in these contexts. The Russian linguist Ilya Shatunovsky attributes this imperfective use as a social understanding between the speaker and interlocutor that the interlocutor has already decided to carry out the action at hand, showing that the "gruff acquiescence" is something akin to resignation whereas the strong encouragement signals support. The Italian linguist Rosanna Benacchio, on the other hand, suggests that the imperfective signals the beginning of or in the middle of the action and the perfective signals its result. The implication of politeness thus derives from the speaker's implied distance from the action itself.

In general, the East Slavic languages do not use the imperfective imperative in commands, nor the perfective imperative in friendly invitations. Other Slavic languages typically use perfective in a wide array of friendly invitations, though Bulgarian may use the imperfective to signal a special social closeness with the listener, especially in female speech. In all other cases, the imperfective is ungrammatical in friendly invitations outside of East Slavic. (Note: Polish has a one-word exception to this rule, sjadać ('to sit down'), which can be used in the imperfective.)

In negative imperatives, there is a tendency towards imperfective forms, though the use of imperative perfective verbs can be used as a warning; compare the Czech imperfective neplač ('don't cry') with the Russian perfective не упадите (ne upadite; 'don't fall, be careful not to fall'). Negative imperative sentences show similar distribution in aspectual usage as negative declarative sentences. Among the South Slavic languages, only Slovene uses perfectives regularly in these contexts.

=== Biaspectuality and anaspectuality ===
While some Slavic verbs do not have a perfective form at all, others are biaspectual, meaning that they perform both imperfective and perfective semantic functions. The term biaspectual is sometimes used interchangeably with anaspectual, though several linguists acknowledge a subtle distinction. Biaspectual verbs may be perceived as perfective or imperfective based on context, but clearly as one or the other. For example, one biaspectual verb may be understood as imperfective in the present tense, but perfective in the past tense. Examples of this dichotomy include the Russian imperfective sentence Наша кафедра регулярно организует конференции ('Our department regularly organizes conferences') as contrasted with the perfective sentence Хорошо, что нам наконец удалось организовать эту конференцию ('It is good that we have finally managed to organize this conference').

Anaspectual verbs are those which have "an ability to apply across a range of tenses and functions normally associated with opposing aspects". In general, many modern Slavicists prefer the term biaspectual to capture both anaspectual and biaspectual concepts in modern Slavic languages, but the term is used in historical linguistics to describe verbs prior to or during the development of modern Slavic aspectual systems. Examples include certain verbs of motion in Old Polish, such as jechać ('to go'), and developments in Old East Slavic as certain verbs such as творити (tvoriti, 'to make') and глаголати (glagolati, 'to speak') moved from anaspectual to imperfective.

Although they are homographs, biaspectual verbs do not appear to be homophonous. In listener acceptability tests conducted with Czech and Russian speakers, sentences which used a biaspectual verb twice – once in a perfective context and the other in an imperfective context – were rejected as ungrammatical. Although a few biaspectual forms are of Slavic origin, loanwords comprise the majority of the biaspectual corpus. Not all loanwords become biaspectual, however. Of the several hundred Russian verbal loans, for example, about 40% of the time they are borrowed as imperfective simplex verbs. However, which verbs are considered biaspectual varies substantially in different Slavic languages. Polish, for example, is extremely quick to integrate loanwords; recent loans generally considered to be biaspectual have been reported with strictly perfectivizing prefixes, as in interpretować ('to interpret', biaspectual) and zinterpretować ('to interpret', perfective). Russian and Czech appear to be less likely to integrate native perfectivizing processes on loans. The term anaspectual may also apply to an emerging class of borrowed verbs in Czech, which are "aspectually underspecified" and behave differently from traditional verbs.

The centrality of aspect to the Slavic grammatical system make distinguishing between perfective and imperfective forms an important part of avoiding ambiguity. There are two main strategies of disambiguation: the insertion of a new imperfectivizing suffix – as in non-standard Russian организовывать (organizovyvat', 'to organize'), an imperfectivized derivative of организовать (organizovat', 'to organize') – or the application of a perfectivizing prefix. Biaspectuality can vary widely from language to language. Polish, for example, has many fewer biaspectual verbs than Czech and Slovak, in part due to the tendency of Polish to re-imperfectivize verbs at higher rates.

== Development ==
=== Inherited aspect ===
Originally, Proto-Slavic inherited an aspectual system from the Proto-Indo-European language, an ancestor language. This system evolved into a stative aspect (inherited from the Proto-Indo-European "perfect"), a prospective (from the inherited "future"), an aorist (from the inherited aorist), (Note: The aorist describes an action in the past tense without reference to the relative time or completeness of the action.) and an imperfective (from the inherited "imperfect"). Over time, Proto-Slavic underwent a series of phonological and grammatical changes that reorganized its inherited system. By the middle period of Common Slavic, the stative aspect was degrammaticized, but a large number of words persisted as "lexicalized vestiges". The prospective was also lost, but had virtually no vestiges, and the imperfective and aorist collapsed into a general "preterite", though aorist forms were partially retained.

The aorist's earlier role may have been roughly identical semantically with its Vedic Sanskrit or Ancient Greek counterparts, but eventually the imperfective and aorist aspects collapsed into the preterite and the erstwhile imperfective and aorist forms became merely stylistic variants. New expressions of telicity emerged sometime thereafter. These were initially adverbs, which went on to develop into prefixes, forming telic verbs. Then atelic/progressive verbs were introduced through suffixation. These are the origins of the Slavic perfective and imperfective verbs, respectively. Eventually, a new imperfect aspect (traditionally referred to as a tense) was formed as well, whereby the preterite form once again acquired an additional aspectual meaning and formed the Proto-Slavic aorist aspect (also referred to traditionally as a tense). Most Slavic languages have done away with the aorist-imperfect contrast by losing both the aorist and the imperfect aspects (tenses), though Bulgarian, Macedonian, Serbo-Croatian, and the Sorbian languages have retained them.

=== Common Slavic innovations ===
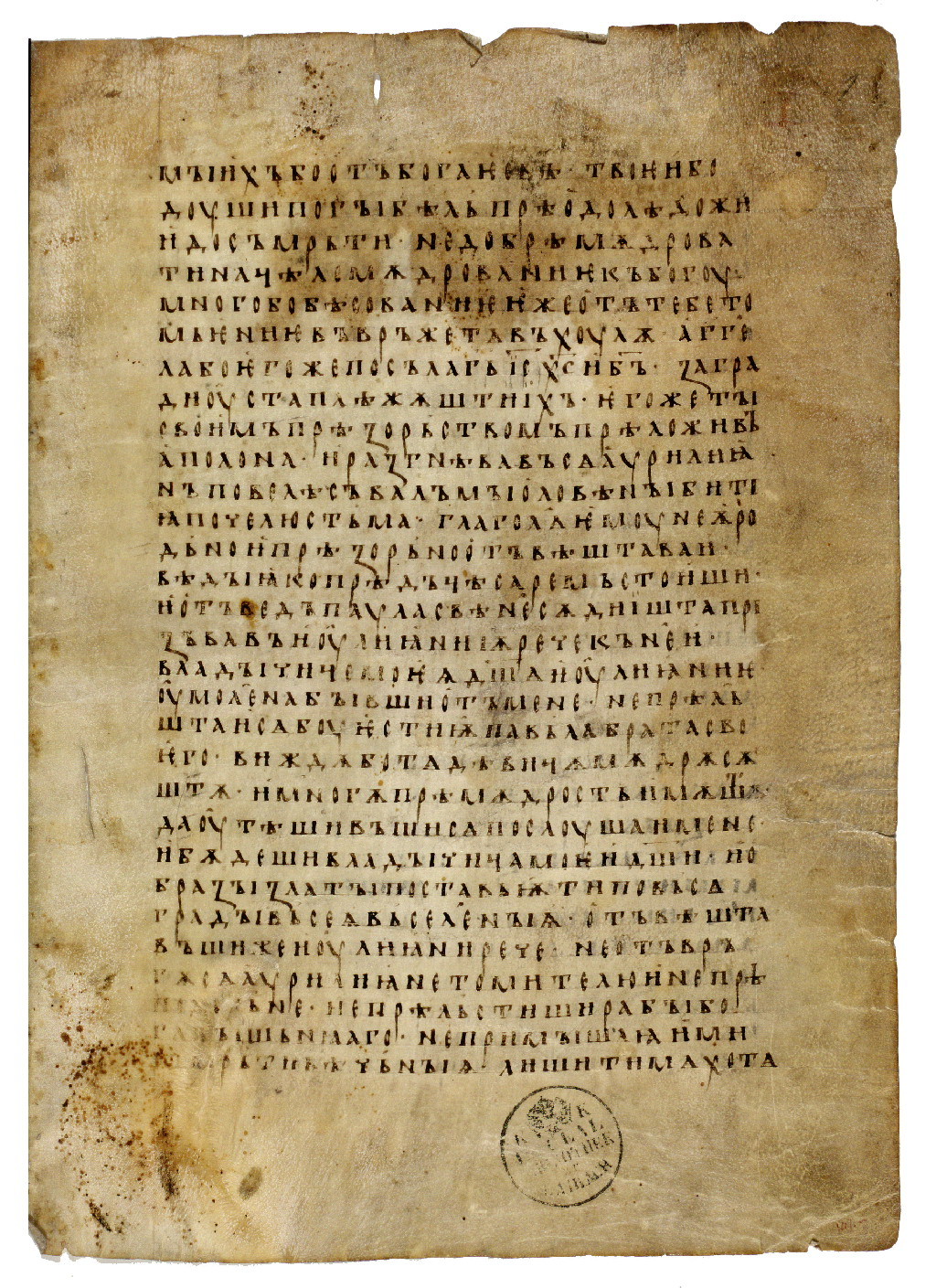
Aspect is attested in the earliest Old Church Slavonic documents (pictured: Codex Suprasliensis, 10th century).

The aspectual system of the modern Slavic languages developed throughout the Proto-Slavic period, during which aspect began to overtake tense as the more important semantic indicator in the Slavic languages. Although Proto-Indo-European already distinguished between perfective and imperfective aspects in the past tense, Proto-Slavic is considered to have emphasized the role of aspect relative to its Proto-Indo-European ancestor. Proto-Slavic had a series of prefixes which later developed into perfective markers before it diverged into the distinct Slavic languages. This development is unique among Indo-European languages; while other language subfamilies such as Greek or Germanic use verbal prefixes to mark semantic changes, Slavic is the only subfamily that uses prefixes to mark aspect. The differentiation of perfective and imperfective aspects is robustly attested in the earliest Old Church Slavonic texts.

Perfectivizing prefixes – that is, prefixes added to an imperfective root verb to create a perfective complement – and imperfectivizing suffixes remained productive in late Proto-Slavic and into some early attested forms such as Old Church Slavonic, though these imperfectivizing suffixes are considered to be the origin of the aspectual system of the Slavic languages. In general, simplex root verbs were imperfect, but the application of a prefix typically changed the lexical meaning of the verb entirely. Classifying prefixes were originally attached to the root verb, giving the verb a new meaning, either by expressing their relation in space – as in the comparison between modern Russian идти (idti, 'to go') with выйти (vyjti; 'to exit', but lit. 'to go out') – or in their metaphorical use, as in стоять (stojat', 'to stand') against выстоять (vystojat'; 'to survive', but lit. 'to stand out'). These verbs were thus understood as perfective verbs and had to have an imperfectivizing process in order to support that semantic function.

The proliferation of the aspectual function to the prefix over its locative function resulted from the semantic bleaching of about seventeen prefixes – most notably *jьz- ('from, out of'), *po- ('after, by, at'), *sъn- ('from, with'), and *u- ('away') – whereby these prefixes became less salient in expressing a spatial meaning. The prefix *u- in particular, originally expressing proximity or result, underwent bleaching due to its overuse in verbs of motion with a clear deixis and was thus reanalyzed. The overlap in meaning with the other aforementioned prefixes and several others led to their own bleaching. As a result, a prefixing aspectual system began to take root. This process was concurrent with the development of the imperfectivizing suffixing system. The imperfectivizing suffixes began as an iterative suffix, signifying that an action took place continually or several times. (Note: This usage persists in Czech where it is used on simplex imperfectives to form iteratives.) Östen Dahl suggests that in reality this may have represented the habitual aspect.

The exact source of the emergence of the Slavic languages' complex aspectual usage is contested. One explanation is that the imperfectivizing suffixes were the result of a typologically rare combination of a stativizing suffix with the increasing use of prefixes to perform aspectual functions. Another explanation argues that the use of prefixes to change the semantics of the verb led to the use of imperfectivizing suffixes to distinguish, following the development of semantic bleaching in those prefixes towards a perfectivizing function. The role of simplex verbs in early Slavic languages has also attracted debate. It is possible that they occupied an anaspectual position – that is, signifying no particular aspectual information whatsoever – though it is likely that these verbs were used as imperfectives, given that most later developed into imperfectives in the modern languages. There is heated debate as to whether the semantic bleaching is complete in some contexts; some Russian linguists, for example, have argued that some prefixes generally seen as having been bleached of all lexical meaning do in fact still affect the lexical meaning of the verb in some way.

=== Independent developments ===
==== Modern aorist usage ====
In Bulgarian, the aorist strongly aligns with the use of the perfective, though imperfective forms can be used as well. Aside from its aspectual use, the aorist also typically marks events the speaker witnessed or signals that the speaker is vouching for the veracity of the statement. Bulgarian also has an aorist form that has coalesced with its l-participle called either the "past aorist active" or the "aorist l-participle" (Bulgarian: минало свършено деятелно причастие, minalo svăršeno dejatelno pričastie; lit. 'past perfective active participle'). This form is used in compound verb constructions which can mark evidentiality, mirativity, and conditionals, among others.

The aorist in Serbo-Croatian has been described as mostly a relic, now found primarily in older texts and literature. It has persisted in speech in some parts of Bosnia and Herzegovina and Montenegro, as well as Serbia though there to a much lesser extent. Montenegrin in particular is notable for its persistent use of the aorist in everyday parlance, whereas in Serbian it is rarely seen, even in administrative and journalistic texts. In Croatian, the aorist is finding renewed use in text messages since the forms are relatively short and are seen as having "stylistic markedness". Where it is used, it has mostly slid back into the semantic field of tense rather than aspect. For example, older forms of Serbo-Croatian treat the aorist as somewhat akin to the simple past while the imperfective signifies the progressive past. Within narratives, the aorist may also signify "sharply foregrounded actions", build narrative tension, show a quick succession of actions, or a combination thereof. Like Bulgarian, the compound use of the aorist biti ('to be') with an l-participle can be used to form conditionals as well.

In standard forms of the Sorbian languages, the aorist was preserved, but has been reanalyzed as the past tense form of perfective verbs. For example, in Upper Sorbian, the perfective wupić ('to drink') is made into the past tense with the aorist form wupich ('I drank'). Similarly, the aorist is used with imperfective verbs to form the imperfect past tense, as in pijach ('I was drinking'), from the imperfective verb pić ('to drink'). (Note: Colloquial Sorbian has mostly lost its traditional past tense forms, collapsing them into the past perfect. It persists in some Upper Sorbian dialects.)

==== Effects of language contact ====
Some minority languages have seen influence from the local dominant language on their aspectual systems. For example, the moribund South Slavic Kajnas dialect (Note: Kajnas is considered to be a southeastern dialect of Macedonian.) – spoken in the Albanian villages of Boboshticë and Drenovë – has developed a progressive aspect under influence from Albanian. The Kajnas terms ǵe and toko map closely to the use of Albanian po and duke, though toko is treated different structurally to duke. Examples include Albanian Tashi po pi raki ('Now I am drinking rakia') with Kajnas Sega ǵe pijam raḱija. The now-extinct Slovincian dialect of the West Slavic Kashubian language, once spoken in Pomerania, underwent similar developments under the influence of Low German.

During the standardization of Sorbian that took place during the 19th century, linguistic purists leaned heavily on the Czech, Polish, and Russian standards in order to remove what they saw as excessive German influence on the languages. From the outset, the use of aspect in this standardization differed from the language as it was being used at the time. Nevertheless, German influence on Sorbian has persisted. The use of directional adverbs as prefixes in German shifted into Sorbian as early as the turn of the 19th century, especially as they function separated from the verb. Examples of this include German wegstoßen ('to push away') decoupling as in sie stieß weg ('she pushed away') manifesting in Sorbian as wot-sterkowaz precz ('to push away') and precz wot-sterczylla ('she pushed away'), irrespective of aspect. (Note: Note these latter two Sorbian examples are written in the contemporary orthography.)

The erosion of perfective–imperfective pairs in Sorbian through the use of directional adverbs has also been attributed to German influence. Directional adverbs in Sorbian may be used to express imperfective concepts covered by more traditional perfectivizations. The word hić ('to go'), for example, when prefixed with the perfectivizing and spacializing prefix wu- ('out'), becomes perfective form wuńć ('to go out'). To avoid the aspectual shift from imperfective to perfective, a directional adverb may be used with the simplex verb, as in the imperfective won hić with the same lexical meaning as the perfective wuńć. In some instances, the adverbs may be loans from German itself, including fort ('away') and durich ('through'), (Note: Sorbian durich comes from German durch with the same meaning.) or used redundantly with prefixed forms.

In Slavomolisano, a descendant of 16th-century Shtokavian Croatian spoken in Italy, the aorist has been replaced by the imperfect tense as a result of language contact with Italian. The loss of the imperfect before the aorist is typical in Slavic typology, but the opposite is true in those influenced by the Romance languages. Similarly, prefixation as a means of perfectivizing is no longer productive in Slavomolisano and perfectives constructed this way often lose their prefixation and become biaspectual simplex verbs. (Note: Breu (2020), written in English, uses "biaspectual" to describe this class of verbs, though in Breu (2017), written in German, the terms "biaspectual" (German: zweiaspektig) and "aspect-neutral" (i.e., anaspectual; aspektneutral) are considered synonymous.) Still, the language produces aspectual pairs with still-productive imperfectivizing suffixation, including with loanwords such as its integration of the Italian verb partire ('to leave') as the perfective partit ('to leave') and the imperfectivized parčivat. The language also allows for aspect–tense combinations which are disallowed in Balkan Serbo-Croatian varieties, including combining the perfective aspect with the imperfect tense, as in dohaju ('I came for a while'). This form is used as a delimitative, suggesting that an action only took place for a limited period of time. Like Kajnas, Slavomolisano has developed additional periphrastic aspects beyond the perfective–imperfective dichotomy through language contact, having developed a progressive aspect and an "imminentive aspect" as imports from Italian. It may additionally have an "ambulative aspect", a kind of habitual aspect, derived from the Italian use of the verb andare ('to go'), as in gredaša lamendivajuč do tuna ('he constantly complained about everything') as compared to its Italian counterpart andava lamentandosi di tutto.

Among heritage speakers of Slavic languages, the imperfectivizing suffix -va- is often used on a perfective verb over its traditional aspectual pair. In Russian heritage speakers, for example, the sentence Эти докторы отменивают аппойнтментс (Eti doktory otmenivajut appointments, 'These doctors cancel appointments') differs from the expected non-heritage form Эти докторы отменяют назначения (Eti doktory otmenjajut naznachenija). In heritage speakers of Serbo-Croatian in Italy, the use of the -va- suffix may have been influenced by the use of Italian -v-, which forms the imperfect tense in verbs, though the semantics are difficult to square. These speakers also differ from non-heritage speakers in their choice of aspect. For example, the perfective is often chosen over the more typical imperfective in habitual or continuous contexts, as in Ja opet se vratim na ovo od prije ('I am coming back to this from before'), where the perfective vratim is chosen over the standard non-heritage imperfective vraćam as in Ja se opet vraćam na ovo od prije.

== East–West theory ==
An isogloss map showing the East–West theory of aspectual typology Eastern group (Russian, Ukrainian, Belarusian, and Bulgarian) Polish and Macedonian, transitional languages leaning eastward Western group (Czech, Slovak, Slovene, and Sorbian) Serbo-Croatian, a cluster of transitional languages leaning westward

The development of the modern Slavic aspectual systems did not arise clearly along phylogenetic lines, though an isogloss has been mapped by Slavic linguists to describe two overarching aspectual typologies: the Eastern group, comprising the East Slavic languages and Bulgarian, and the Western group, comprising Czech, Slovak, Sorbian, and Slovene. This division appears to have developed as the result of several accumulated changes beginning around the 17th century in the Eastern group, namely regarding the narrowing of perfective usage around habitual events.

Among languages found in the Eastern group, the perfective is defined by "temporal definiteness" – that is, that the action is complete and unique, as well as "qualitatively different" from actions before and after it – where the Western group is marked by "totality" as an indivisible whole. The imperfective is marked as having "quantitative temporal indefiniteness" in the Western group, which allows an action to be assigned to several situations through time; this is disallowed in the Eastern group. In the Eastern group, the perfective is defined by its role in explicitly linking discrete events in a sequence. By contrast, the imperfective is qualitative in that it cannot be assigned to a singular event which can be related to other discrete events. Among languages in the Western group, the perfective is used to unite an event as a "single indivisible whole", even if the action occurs more than in one discrete moment in time, and it does not link its argument to other events surrounding it. The imperfective among the Western group, conversely, can be assigned to several different – but indefinite – events.

These differences can be exemplified with the sentence "He drinks a glass of vodka every day"; in Czech, the sentence is Vypije jednu skleničku vodky denně, with a perfective form of 'to drink', but in Russian, the sentence is Каждый день он выпивает по одной рюмке водки (Každyj den' on vypivaet po odnoj rjumke vodki), using its imperfective form. In Czech, the Western example, the habitual nature of the action places the verb in its totality; the drinking is completed every day. Conversely, in Russian, the action cannot be pinned to one unique temporal or relational location; the habitual nature of the verb means that it is not viewed as complete nor placed in a sequence of events. When two habitual actions are placed in relation to one another, the perfective becomes an acceptable aspect for such a sequence, as in Russian Он всегда так—выпьет кофе и пойдет на работу (On vsegda tak—vyp'et kofe i pojdet na rabotu; 'He's always like that—drinks his coffee and goes to work').

Differences are similarly typified with the use of imperatives as well. In the Eastern group, immediate requests are preferred in the imperfective, while the perfective is seen as somewhat unnatural; in the Western group, the perfective is prohibited in that context. In Polish and Bulgarian, use of the imperfect in these contexts is somewhat awkward or unnatural, but not ungrammatical.

Polish and Serbo-Croatian are both considered to be transitional languages and share characteristics of both, though Polish leans eastward whereas Serbo-Croatian leans westward. Serbo-Croatian itself has an internal continuum; Croatian is more typologically Western, while Serbian is more typologically Eastern. Macedonian's position is somewhat unclear, though it is either a divergent form of the Eastern group or a transitional dialect which leans most towards the Eastern group. Although Serbian is more typologically Eastern than other varieties of Serbo-Croatian, Macedonian is more Eastern than Serbian. Bulgarian aspectual use does depart from East Slavic usage in some substantial ways – including its use of the perfective aspect with the imperfect tense to express habitual actions – though even these deviations follow other rules of the typological class and are not considered substantial enough to warrant a unique categorization. Because of the differences exhibited by Bulgarian and Macedonian, the East Slavic languages are sometimes referred to as the "Eastern extreme" to distinguish them; Czech, Slovak, and Sorbian have been similarly dubbed the "Western extreme" due to some deviations in Slovene.

Maslov's criterion for determining aspectual pairs can be used for all members of the Eastern group, including Polish. In the Western group, both forms can be used in the historical present, including Serbo-Croatian, which makes the identification of aspectual pairs more difficult. For example, in Serbo-Croatian, both the present perfective Ivan upozna Petra ('John meets Peter') and imperfective Ivan upoznaje Petra ('John is meeting Peter') can serve as historical present forms of the past perfective Ivan je upoznao Petra.

== See also ==
- Comparative linguistics
- Eastern Romance influence on Slavic languages
- Glossary of sound laws in the Indo-European languages § Slavic
- History of the Slavic languages
- Mass comparison
- Outline of Slavic history and culture
- Proto-Slavic borrowings
- Slavicization
- Slavic literature
- Slavic microlanguages
- Slavic migrations to the Balkans
- Slavs
- Tense–aspect–mood
- Wave model
