= Viktor Zhivov =

Russian philologist (1945 – 2013)

- Виктор Живов
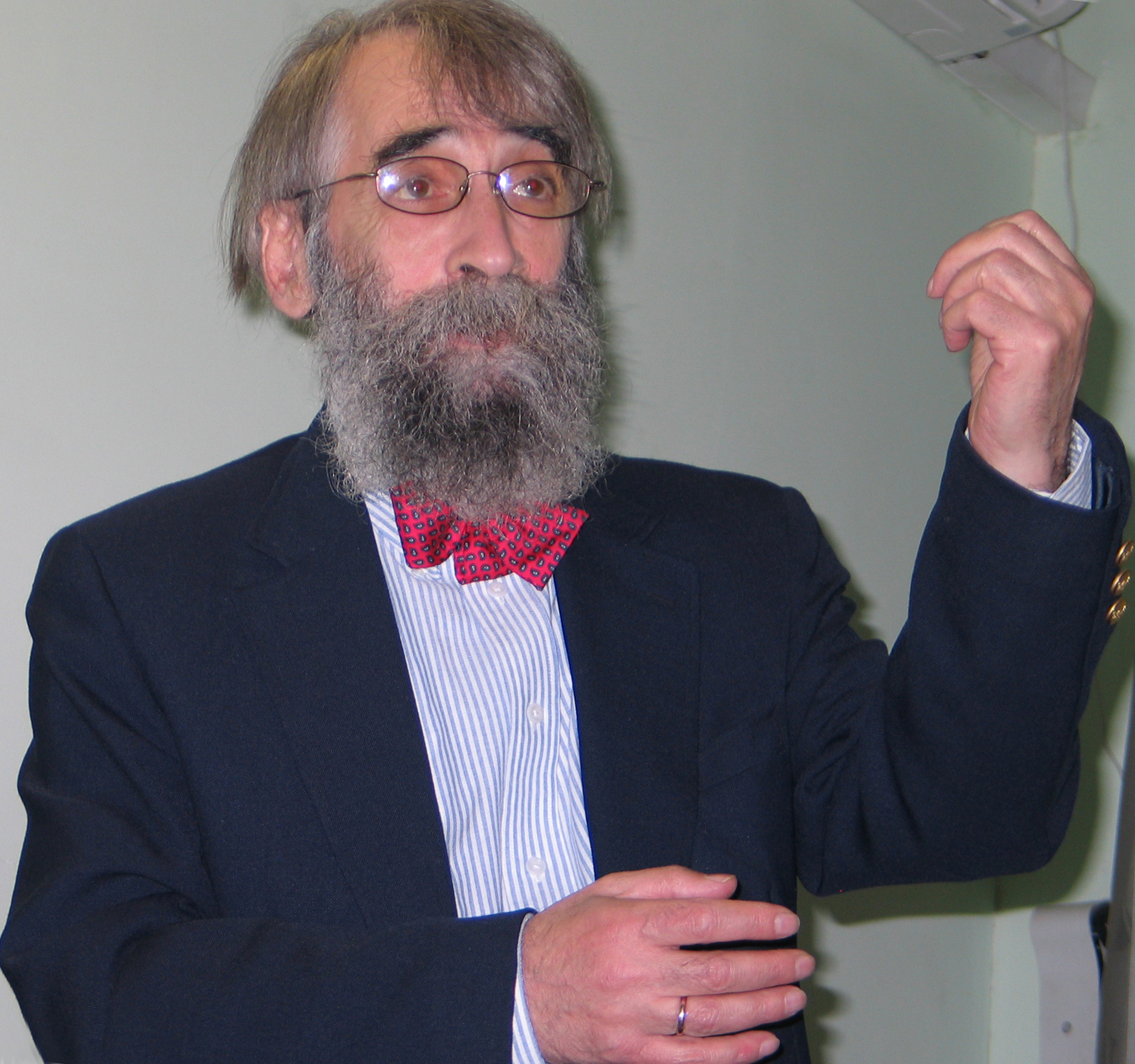
- Zhivov in 2008
- Born: February 5, 1945; Moscow, Soviet Union
- Died: April 17, 2013 (aged 68); Berkeley, California, U.S.

Academic background
- Education: Moscow State University

Viktor Markovich Zhivov (Russian: Виктор Маркович Живов; February 5, 1945 in Moscow – April 17, 2013 in Berkeley, California) was a Russian and American philologist, specializing on the history of Russian language. Zhivov was a professor at the Russian Language Institute of Russian Academy of Sciences in Moscow and at the Department of Slavic and Languages and Literatures at the University of California, Berkeley.

Viktor Zhivov was born in 1945 in Moscow in a Jewish family. His father was Mark Zhivov, an author and a translator. He graduated from Moscow State University and in 1977 obtained his Candidate of Sciences degree there for his thesis on Russian phonology. Zhivov was a professor at Moscow State University and received there the degree of a Doctor of Science in 1992. In 2001, he retired from Moscow State University. Zhivov joined faculty of the University of California, Berkeley in 1995 and until his death had a double appointment: He was teaching at Berkeley half a year every year, and he spent the rest of his time in Moscow, where he was a Deputy Director of the Russian Language Institute.

In 1982, Zhivov published a paper on the works of Maximus the Confessor, which is still highly cited. In 1994, he published a dictionary of sacred terms in Russian. Until his death, he was working on a monograph on the history of Russian language, which he almost completed.
