= Accentology =

Systematic analysis of word or phrase stress

Accentology involves a systematic analysis of word or phrase stress. Sub-areas of accentology include Germanic accentology, Balto-Slavic accentology, Indo-European accentology, and Japanese accentology.

== See also ==
- Proto-Slavic accent
