= Macedonian Slavs (disambiguation) =

Macedonian Slavs, most commonly known as ethnic Macedonians (Macedonian: Македонци, romanized: Makedonci), are a South Slavic ethnic group primarily associated with North Macedonia.

Macedonian Slavs can also refer to several peoples of Slavic origins in the region of Macedonia:

- Macedonian Bulgarians, ethnic Bulgarians from the region of Macedonia
  - Bulgarians in North Macedonia
- Serbs of North Macedonia
- Macedonian Muslims
- Slavic speakers of Greek Macedonia
- Slavic speakers in Ottoman Macedonia
- Several early medieval Slavic tribes settling in the region of Macedonia, including:
  - Berziti
  - Drougoubitai
  - Rhynchinoi
  - Sagudates
  - Smolyani
  - Strymonites

== See also ==
- Slav (disambiguation)
- Slavic (disambiguation)
- Macedonian (disambiguation)
- Macedonia (disambiguation)
- Macedonia (terminology)
- Macedonian language naming dispute
