= Sclaveni =

Early Slavic tribes

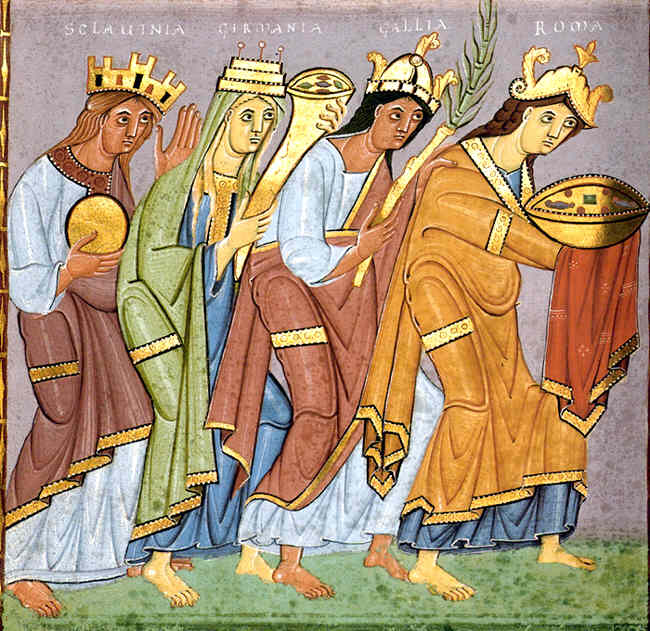
Personification of "Sclavinia", 990 AD

The Sclaveni (in Latin) or Sklabenoi (various forms in Greek) were early Slavic tribes that raided, invaded and settled in Southeastern Europe in the Early Middle Ages and eventually became one of the progenitors of modern South Slavs. They were mentioned by early Byzantine chroniclers as barbarians having appeared at the Byzantine borders along with the Antes (East Slavs), another Slavic group. The Sclaveni were differentiated from the Antes and Wends (West Slavs); however, they were described as kin. Eventually, most South Slavic tribes accepted Byzantine or Frankish suzerainty, and came under their cultural influences and Chalcedonian Christianity. The term was widely used as a general catch-all term until the emergence of separate tribal names by the 10th century.

== Customs ==
The Sclaveni had customs and culture similar if not identical to those of the Antes. They were carefully described by chroniclers such as Procopius and Maurice, whose works contribute greatly to our understanding of these two Early Slavic peoples.

Maurice writes that the Slavs were very hospitable people. Tribes that mistreated guests were attacked for their dishonour. Prisoners were not kept forever and after a certain period of time, captives were allowed to be let loose or to join the community. Settlements were built in hard-to-reach forests, lakes and marshes as they were hard to attack, with exits in many directions for escape. They farmed many crops, especially millet, but also had livestock of many sorts. Maurice praises their toleration of discomfort when necessary, and the loyalty of married women to their husbands. The Strategikon noted that the Antes and Sclaveni were independent, refusing to be governed or enslaved. They lived under democracy, with all matters being referred to the people.

The religion of the Sclaveni, like other Slavic tribes and peoples, was Slavic paganism.

The Antes and Sclaveni were skilled warriors, especially in guerrilla warfare, taking advantage of terrain. They preferred to fight in dense woodland instead of pitched battle, although field battles and sieges were also recorded. Their weapons were javelins, spears, bows nocked with poison tipped arrows and sturdy wooden shields, but body armour was rare.

== Terminology ==
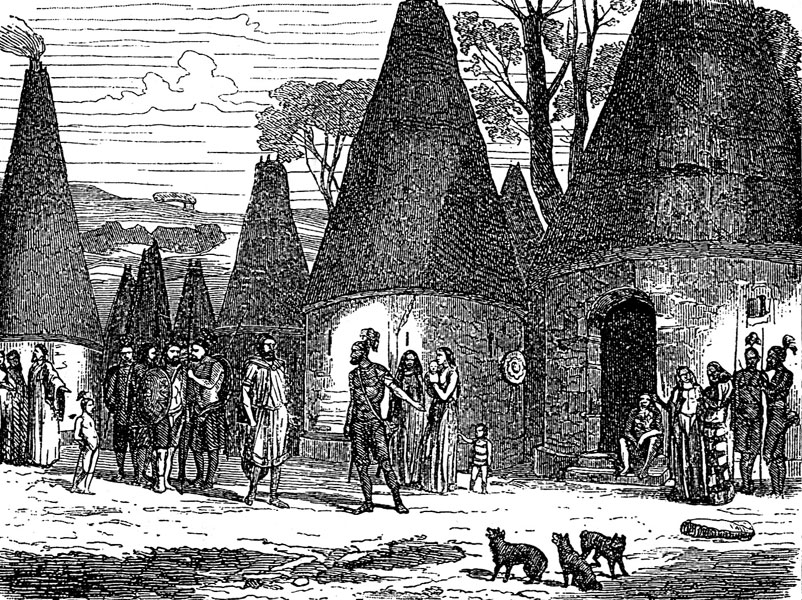
Illustration of Sclaveni between the Danube and the Balkan Mountains

The Byzantines broadly grouped the numerous Slav tribes living in proximity with the Eastern Roman Empire into two groups: the Sklavenoi and the Antes. The Sclaveni were called as such by Procopius, and as Sclavi by Jordanes and Pseudo-Maurice (Greek: Σκλαβηνοί (Sklabēnoi), Σκλαυηνοί (Sklauēnoi), or Σκλάβινοι (Sklabinoi); Latin: Sclaueni, Sclavi, Sclauini, or Sthlaueni - Sklaveni). The derived Greek term Sklavinia(i) (Σκλαβινίαι; Latin: Sclaviniae) was used for Slav tribes in Byzantine Macedonia and the Peloponnese; these Slavic territories were initially outside of Byzantine control. By 800, however, the term also referred specifically to Slavic mobile military colonists who settled as allies within the territories of the Byzantine Empire. Slavic military settlements appeared in the Peloponnese, Asia Minor, and Apulia.

== Byzantine historiography ==
Procopius gives the most detail about the Sclaveni and Antes. The Sclaveni are also mentioned by Jordanes (fl. 551), Pseudo-Caesarius (560), Menander Protector (mid-6th c.), the Strategikon (late 6th c.), etc.

== History ==
=== 4th century ===
In describing the lands of Scythia, Jordanes states that "the populous race of the Venethi occupy a great expanse of land. Though their names are now dispersed amid various clans and places, yet they are chiefly called Sklaveni and Antes." Later on, when describing the peoples subject to the Gothic king Ermanaric, Jordanes said that the Veneti "now go by three names: Veneti, Antes, and Sclaveni". Scholars have traditionally taken the accounts of Jordanes as face-value evidence that the Sklaveni and (the bulk of the) Antes descended from the Venedi, a tribe known to historians such as Tacitus, Ptolemy, and Pliny the Elder since the 2nd century CE.

=== 6th century ===
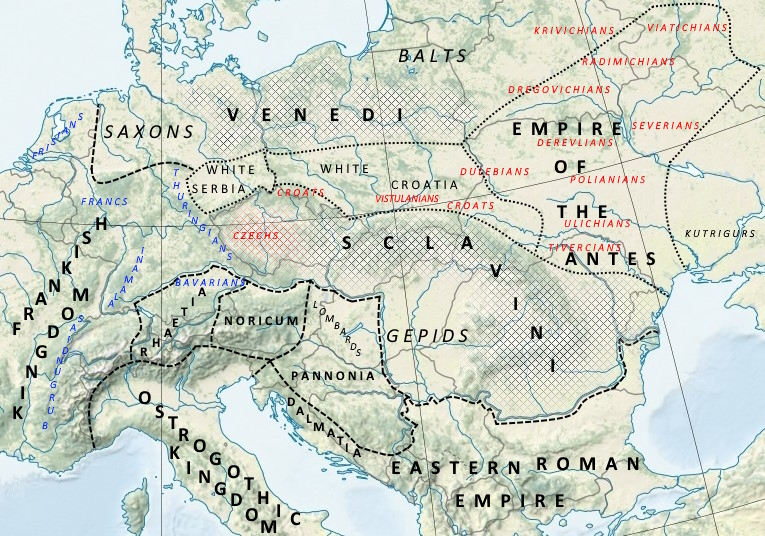
Historical situation in cca. 560 AD before the in'svasion of the Pannonian Avars, according to Francis Dvornik (1949–56).

Scholar Michel Kazanski identified the 6th-century Prague culture and Sukow-Dziedzice group as Sclaveni archaeological cultures, and the Penkovka culture was identified as Antes. The first Slavic raid south of the Danube was recorded by Procopius (writing in the mid-6th century CE), who mentions an attack of the Antes, "who dwell close to the Sclaveni", probably in 518. In the 530s, Emperor Justinian seems to have used divide and conquer policies, and the Sclaveni and Antes are mentioned as fighting each other.

Sclaveni are mentioned in the context of the military policy on the Danube frontier of Byzantine Emperor Justinian I (r. 527–565). In 537, Justinian shipped 1,600 cavalry, made up of mostly Sclaveni and Antes, to Italy to rescue Belisarius. Sometime between 533–34 and 545 (probably before the 539–40 Hun or Bulgar-Hun invasion of the Byzantine Empire), there was a conflict between the Antes and Sclaveni in Eastern Europe. Procopius noted that the two "became hostile to one another and engaged in battle" until a Sclavene victory resulted. The conflict was likely aided or initiated by the Byzantines. The Romans also recruited mounted mercenaries from both tribes to fight against the Ostrogoths. The two tribes were at peace by 545. The Antes are last mentioned as anti-Byzantine belligerents in 545, and the Sclaveni continued to raid the Balkans. Around the 540s, the exiled Lombard prince Hildigis, the legitimate heir of King Tato, led a contingent of several thousand men, consisting of Sclaveni, Lombards, and Gepids into Roman Thrace, thoroughly plundering the region and routing the Byzantine army in several engagements. Between 545 and 549, the Sclaveni raided deep into Roman territory. Between 550 and 552, the Gepid king Thurisind used his control of the Danube to ferry Sclavenian and Kutrigur raiders to and from Byzantine territory, and obtained payment from them in the process. In the summer of 550, The Sclaveni came close to Naissus, and were seen as a great threat, however, their intent of capturing Thessaloniki and the surroundings was thwarted by Germanus. After this, for a year, the Sclaveni spent their time in Dalmatia "as if in their own land". The Sclaveni then raided Illyricum and returned home with booty. In 550 Hildigis, commanding a contingent of 7,000 Slavs, Lombards and Gepids, attacked and plundered Moesia, where he defeated Byzantine imperial soldiers and advanced as far as Constantinople. Procopius of Caesarea wrote concerning these events:

"(...) In Illyria and Thracia, from the Ionian Gulf to Byzantine surrounding cities, where Hellas and Chersonese regions are situated, (...) the Sclavenes and the Antes, penetrating practically every year since Justinian administering the Roman Empire, were inflicting irreversible damage to their inhabitants. In each invasion, I estimate 200,000 Romans were either taken as prisoners or killed (...)".

In 558 the Avars arrived on the Black Sea steppe, and defeated the Antes between the Dnieper and Dniester. The Avars subsequently allied themselves with the Sclaveni.

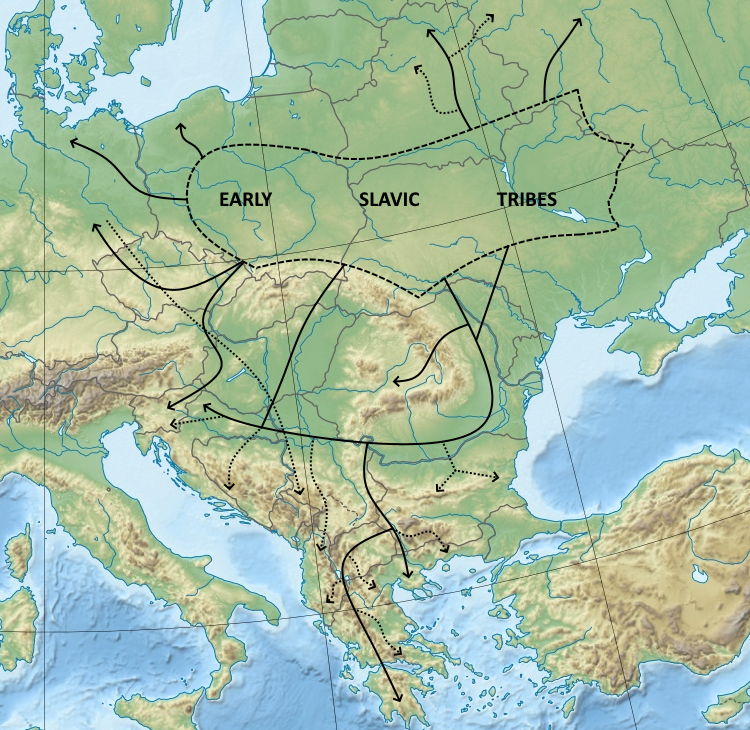
Slavic migrations to the Balkans

Daurentius (fl. 577–579), the first Slavic chieftain recorded by name, was sent an Avar embassy requesting his Slavs to accept Avar suzerainty and pay tribute, because the Avars knew that the Slavs had amassed great wealth after repeatedly plundering the Balkans. Daurentius reportedly retorted that "Others do not conquer our land, we conquer theirs [...] so it shall always be for us", and had the envoys slain. The Avar khagan Bayan then campaigned (in 578) against Daurentius' people, with aid from the Byzantines, and set fire to many of their settlements, although this did not stop the Slavic raids deep into the Byzantine Empire. In 578, a large army of Sclaveni devastated Thrace and other areas. In the 580s, the Romans bribed the Antes to attack Sclaveni settlements.

Around the 580s, as the Slavic communities along the Danube became more numerous and organized, and as the Avars exerted their influence, "barbarian" incursions into the Byzantine Empire grew in scale, leading to permanent settlements. John of Ephesus wrote concerning these events:

"(...) “That same year being the third after the death of king Justin, was famous also for the invasion of an accursed people, called Slavonians (Sclavenes), who overran the whole of Greece, and the country of the Thessalonians, and all Thrace, and captured the cities, and took numerous forts, and devastated and burnt, and reduced the people to slavery, and made themselves masters of the whole country, and settled in it by main force, and dwelt in it as though it had been their own without fear. And four years have now elapsed, and still, because the king is engaged in the war with the Persians, and has sent all his forces to the East, they live at their ease in the land, and dwell in it, and spread themselves far and wide as far as God permits them, and ravage and burn and take captive. And to such an extent do they carry their ravages that they have even ridden up to the outer wall of the city, and driven away all the king’s herds of horses, many thousands in number, and whatever else they could find. And even to this day, being the year 895 (A. D. 584), they still encamp and dwell there, and dwell in peace in the Roman territories, and lead captive and slay and burn: and they have grown rich in gold and silver, and herds of horses, and arms, and have learned to fight better than the Romans."

According to Florin Curta, John exaggerated the intensity of the Slavic incursions since he was influenced by his confinement in Constantinople from 571 up until 579, moreover, he perceived the Slavs as God's instrument for punishing the persecutors of the Monophysites.

By 586, Slavs managed to raid the western Peloponnese, Attica, Epirus, leaving only the east part of Peloponnese, which was mountainous and inaccessible. In 586 AD, as many as 100,000 Slav warriors raided Thessaloniki. The final attempt to restore the Romans' northern border occurred between 591 and 605, when the end of conflicts with Persia allowed Emperor Maurice to transfer units to the north. However he was deposed after a military revolt in 602, and the Danubian frontier collapsed one and a half decades later (see Maurice's Balkan campaigns). In this period are mentioned Sclaveni rex Musokios and chieftains Ardagast and Peiragastus.

=== 7th century ===
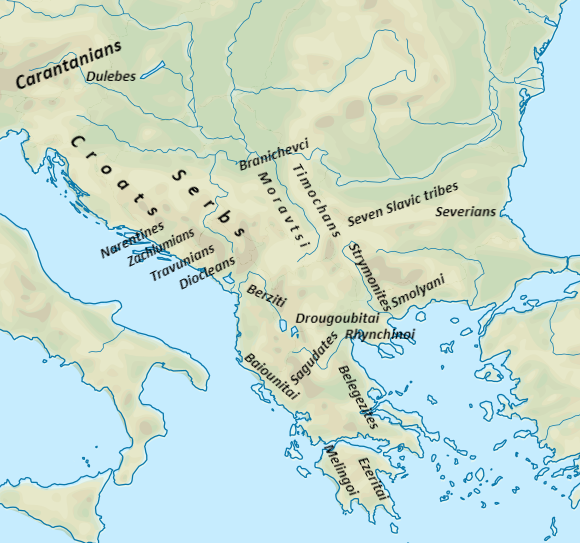
Approximate location of South Slavic tribes, per V. V. Sedov (1995)

In 602, the Avars attacked the Antes; this is the last mention of Antes in historical sources. In 615, during the reign of Heraclius (r. 610–641), the whole Balkans was regarded as Sklavinia – inhabited or controlled by Slavs. Chatzon led the Slavic attack on Thessaloniki that year. The Slavs asked the Avars for aid, resulting in an unsuccessful siege (617). In 626, Sassanids, Avars and Slavs joined forces and unsuccessfully besieged Constantinople. During the same year of the siege, the Slavs used their monoxyla in order to transport the 3,000 troops of the allied Sassanids across the Bosphorus which the latter had promised the khagan of the Avars. Based on the De Administrando Imperio, it is also theorized that the migration of White Croats and Serbs could have been part of a second Slavic wave during Heraclius' reign.

Constans II conquered Sklavinia in 657–658, "capturing many and subduing", and settled captured Slavs in Asia Minor; in 664–65, 5,000 of these joined Abdulreman ibn Khalid. Perbundos, the chieftain of the Rhynchinoi, a powerful tribe near Thessaloniki, planned a siege on Thessaloniki but was imprisoned and eventually executed after escaping prison; the Rhynchinoi, Strymonitai, Sagoudatai and Drougoubitai made common cause, rose up and laid the Siege to Thessaloniki for two years (676–678).

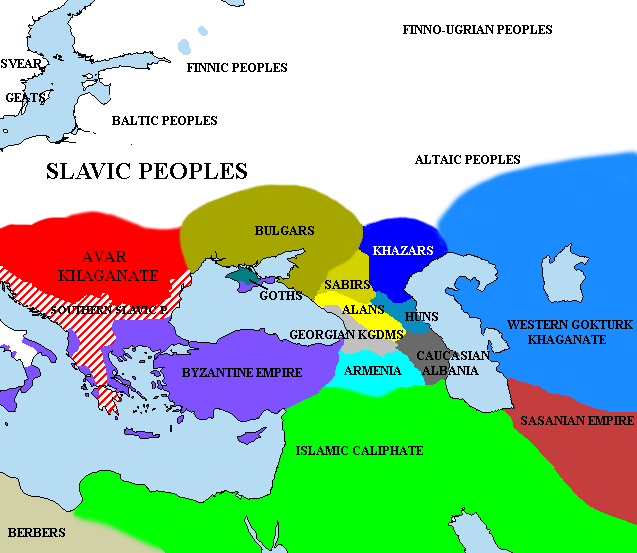
The Pontic steppe, c. 650, showing the early territories of the Khazars, Bulgars, and Avars

The First Bulgarian Empire was the first state that the empire recognised in the Balkans and the first time it legally surrendered claims to part of its Balkan dominions. In 680 the Byzantine Emperor Constantine IV (r. 668–685), having recently defeated the Arabs, led an expedition at the head of a huge army and fleet to drive off the Bulgars but suffered a disastrous defeat at the hands of Asparuh at Onglos, a swampy region in or around the Danube Delta where the Bulgars had set a fortified camp. The Bulgars advanced south, crossed the Balkan Mountains and invaded Thrace. In 681, the Byzantines were compelled to sign a humiliating peace treaty, forcing them to acknowledge Bulgaria as an independent state, to cede the territories to the north of the Balkan Mountains and to pay an annual tribute. The relations between the Bulgars and the local Slavs is a matter of debate depending on the interpretation of the Byzantine sources. Vasil Zlatarski asserts that they concluded a treaty, but most historians agree that they were subjugated. The Bulgars were superior organisationally and militarily and came to dominate politically the new state, but there was cooperation between them and the Slavs for the protection of the country. The Slavs were allowed to retain their chiefs, to abide to their customs and in return they were to pay tribute in kind and to provide foot soldiers for the army. The Seven Slavic tribes were relocated to the west to protect the frontier with the Avar Khaganate, while the Severi were resettled in the eastern Balkan Mountains to guard the passes to the Byzantine Empire. The number of Asparuh's Bulgars is difficult to estimate. Vasil Zlatarski and John Van Antwerp Fine Jr. suggest that they were not particularly numerous, numbering some 10,000, while Steven Runciman considers that the tribe must have been of considerable dimensions.

Justinian II (r. 685–695) settled as many as 30,000 Slavs from Thrace in Asia Minor, in an attempt to boost military strength. Most of them however, with their leader Neboulos, deserted to the Arabs at the Battle of Sebastopolis in 692.

=== 8th century ===
Military campaigns in northern Greece in 758 under Constantine V (r. 741–775) prompted a relocation of Slavs under Bulgar aggression; again in 783. Bulgaria had by 773 cut off the communication route, the Vardar valley, between Serbia and the Byzantines. The Bulgars were defeated in 774, after Emperor Constantine V learnt of their planned raid. In 783, a large Slavic uprising took place in the Byzantine Empire, stretching from Macedonia to the Peloponnese, which was subsequently quelled by Byzantine patrikios Staurakios (fl. 781–800). Dalmatia, inhabited by Slavs in the interior, at this time, had firm relations with Byzantium. In 799, Akameros, a Slavic archon, participated in the conspiracy against Empress Irene of Athens.

== Relationship with Byzantium ==
Byzantine literary accounts (such as John of Ephesus) mention Slavs raiding areas of Greece in the 580s. According to later sources such as the Miracles of Saint Demetrius, the Drougoubitai, Sagoudatai, Belegezitai, Baiounetai, and Berzetai laid siege to Thessaloniki in 614–616. However, that particular event was actually of local significance. A combined effort of the Avars and Slavs two years later also failed to take the city. In 626, a combined Avar, Bulgar and Slav army besieged Constantinople. The siege was broken, which had repercussions for the power and the prestige of the Avar khanate. Slavic pressure on Thessaloniki ebbed after 617/618, until the Siege of Thessalonica (676–678) by a coalition of Rynchinoi, Sagoudatai, Drougoubitai and Stroumanoi attacked. This time, the Belegezites, also known as the Velegeziti, did not participate and in fact supplied the besieged citizens of Thessaloniki with grain. It seems that the Slavs settled on places of earlier settlements and probably merged later with the local populations of Greek descent to form mixed Byzantine-Slavic communities. The process was stimulated by the conversion of the Slavic tribes to orthodox Christianity on the Balkans during the same period.

A number of medieval sources attest to the presence of Slavs in Greece. The 7th-century scholar Isidore of Seville wrote that, in the fifth year of the reign of Emperor Heraclius (610–641), "the Slavs took Greece away from the Romans." En route to the Holy Land in 732, Willibald "reached the city of Monemvasia, in the land of Slavinia". This particular passage from the Vita Willibaldi is interpreted as an indication of a Slavic presence in the hinterland of the Peloponnese. In reference to the plague of 744–747, Constantine VII wrote in the 10th century that "the entire country [of the Peloponnese] was Slavonized". Another source for the period, the Chronicle of Monemvasia, speaks of Slavs overrunning the western Peloponnese but of the eastern Peloponnese, together with Athens, remaining in Byzantine hands throughout the period. However, such sources are far from ideal, and their reliability is debated. For example, the Byzantinist Peter Charanis believes the Chronicle of Monemvasia to be a reliable account, but other scholars point out that it greatly overstates the impact of the Slavic and Avar raids of Greece during this time.

Max Vasmer, a prominent linguist and Indo-Europeanist, complements late medieval historical accounts by listing 429 Slavic toponyms from the Peloponnese alone. The extent that the presence of the toponyms reflects compact Slavic settlement is a matter of some debate and might represent an accumulative strata of toponyms, rather than being attributed to the earliest settlement phase.

Relations between the Slavs and the Greeks were probably peaceful apart from the (supposed) initial settlement and intermittent uprisings. Being agriculturalists, the Slavs probably traded with the Greeks inside towns. Furthermore, the Slavs surely did not occupy the whole interior or eliminate the Greek population since some Greek villages continued to exist in the interior, probably governed themselves and possibly paid tribute to the Slavs. Some villages were probably mixed, and quite possibly, some degree of Hellenization of the Slavs by the Greeks of the Peloponnese had already begun during this period, before re-Hellenization was completed by the Byzantine emperors.

When the Byzantines were not fighting in their eastern territories, they slowly regained imperial control. That was achieved through its theme system, which refers to an administrative province on which an army corps was centred under the control of a strategos ("general"). The theme system first appeared in the early 7th century, during the reign of the Emperor Heraclius. As the Byzantine Empire recovered, the system was imposed on all areas that came under Byzantine control. The first Balkan theme was created in Thrace in 680 AD. By 695, a second theme, that of "Hellas" (or "Helladikoi"), was established, probably in eastern central Greece. Subduing the Slavs in the themes was simply a matter of accommodating the needs of the Slavic elites and providing them with incentives for their inclusion into the imperial administration.

It was not until 100 years later that a third theme would be established. In 782–784, the eunuch general Staurakios campaigned from Thessaloniki, south to Thessaly and into the Peloponnese. He captured many Slavs and transferred them elsewhere, mostly Anatolia (these Slavs were dubbed Slavesians). However, it is not known whether any territory was restored to imperial authority as result of the campaign although it is likely that some was. Sometime between 790 and 802, the theme of Macedonia was created, centred on Adrianople (east of the modern geographic entity). A serious and successful recovery began under Nicephorus I (802–811). In 805, the theme of the Peloponnese was created. According to the Chronicle of Monemvasia the Byzantine governor of Corinth went in 805 to war with the Slavs, obliterated them and allowed the original inhabitants to claim their own. The city of Patras was recovered and the region resettled with Greeks. In the 9th century, new themes continued to arise although many were small and were carved out of original larger themes. New themes in the 9th century included those of Thessalonica, Dyrrhachium, Strymon and Nicopolis. From those themes, Byzantine laws and culture flowed into the interior. By the late 9th century, most of Greece was culturally and administratively Greek again except for a few small Slavic tribes in the mountains such as the Melingoi and Ezeritai. Although they would remain relatively autonomous until Ottoman times, such tribes were the exception, rather than the rule.

Apart from military expeditions against Slavs, the re-Hellenization process begun under Nicephorus I involved (often forcible) transfer of peoples. Many Slavs were moved to other parts of the empire, such as Anatolia, and made to serve in the military. In return, many Greeks from Sicily and Asia Minor were brought to the interior of Greece to increase the number of defenders at the Emperor's disposal and to dilute the concentration of Slavs. Even non-Greeks were transferred to the Balkans, such as Armenians. As more of the peripheral territories of the Byzantine Empire were lost in the following centuries, such as Sicily, southern Italy and Asia Minor, their Greek-speakers made their own way back to Greece. The re-Hellenization of Greece by population transfers and cultural activities of the Church was successful, which suggests that Slavs found themselves in the midst of many Greeks. It is doubtful that such large number could have been transplanted into Greece in the 9th century; surely many Greeks had remained in Greece and continued to speak Greek throughout the period of Slavic occupation. According to others during the peak of the Slavic incursions in the 7th and 8th centuries, the demographic and linguistic landscape of the area comprising modern Greece was significantly altered. While exact census data from the Early Middle Ages does not exist, modern historians estimate that prior to the Byzantine campaigns of re-Hellenization, Slavic-speakers may have constituted the majority of the population within the modern borders of Greece.

This demographic shift, however, was geographically highly uneven. The Slavic populations organized themselves into autonomous rural settlements known as Sklaviniai. Consequently, the rural hinterlands of Macedonia, Epirus, Thessaly, and the Peloponnese saw a massive influx of Sclaveni tribes (such as the Melingoi and Ezeritai), where Slavic dialects became the dominant language. The widespread nature of this settlement is corroborated by the linguistic research of Max Vasmer, who cataloged over 2,000 Slavic toponyms across the Greek mainland.

Eventually, the Byzantines recovered the imperial border north all the way to today's region of Macedonia, which would serve as the northern border of the Byzantine Empire until 1018, although independent Slavic villages remained. As the Slavs supposedly occupied the entire Balkan interior, Constantinople was effectively cut off from the Dalmatian city-states under its (nominal) control. Thus, Dalmatia came to have closer ties with the Italian Peninsula because of its ability to maintain contact by sea, but it too was troubled by Slavic pirates. Additionally, Constantinople was cut off from Rome, which contributed to the growing cultural and political separation between the two centres of European Christendom.

== See also ==
- List of medieval Slavic tribes
- Saqaliba, medieval Arabic term used for Slavs and other Europeans, derived from slavos/sklavenos

== Sources ==
- Byzantinoslavica. Vol. 61–62. Academia. 2003. pp. 78–79.
- Bintliff, J.L. (2003). "The ethnoarchaeology of a 'passive' ethnicity: The Arvanites of Central Greece.". In Brown, K.S.; Hamilakis, Y. (eds.). The Usable Past. Greek Metahistories. Lanham-Boulder: Lexington Books. pp. 129–144.
- Bozhilov, I.; Gyuzelev, V. (1999). History of Medieval Bulgaria 7th-14th Centuries (in Bulgarian). Sofia: Anubis. ISBN 954-426-204-0.
- Curta, Florin (2001). The Making of the Slavs: History and Archaeology of the Lower Danube Region, c. 500–700. Cambridge: Cambridge University Press. ISBN 9781139428880.
- Curta, Florin (2006). Southeastern Europe in the Middle Ages, 500–1250. Cambridge: Cambridge University Press. ISBN 978-0-521-81539-0.
- Davis, Jack L.; Alcock, Susan E. (1998). Sandy Pylos: An Archaeological History from Nestor to Navarino. Austin: University of Texas Press. p. 215.
- Fine, John V. A. Jr. (1991) [1983]. The Early Medieval Balkans: A Critical Survey from the Sixth to the Late Twelfth Century. Ann Arbor: University of Michigan Press. ISBN 0-472-08149-7.
- Fine, John V.A. (1983). The Ancient Greeks: A Critical History. Hartford, CT: Harvard University Press. ISBN 9780674033146.
- Howard-Johnston, J. D. (2006). East Rome, Sasanian Persia and the End of Antiquity: Historiographical and Historical Studies. Ashgate Publishing, Ltd. ISBN 978-0860789925.
- Hupchick, Dennis P. (2004). The Balkans: From Constantinople to Communism. Palgrave Macmillan. ISBN 978-1-4039-6417-5.
- Kaimakamova, Miliana; Salamon, Maciej (2007). Byzantium, new peoples, new powers: the Byzantino-Slav contact zone, from the ninth to the fifteenth century. Towarzystwo Wydawnicze "Historia Iagellonica". ISBN 978-83-88737-83-1.
- Kobyliński, Zbigniew (2005). "The Slavs". In Fouracre, Paul (ed.). The New Cambridge Medieval History, Volume 1, c.500–c.700. Cambridge: Cambridge University Press. pp. 524–544. ISBN 978-1-13905393-8.
- James, Edward (2014). Europe's Barbarians AD 200-600. Routledge. ISBN 978-1-317-86825-5.
- Janković, Đorđe (2004). "The Slavs in the 6th Century North Illyricum". Гласник Српског археолошког друштва. 20: 39–61.
- Jenkins, Romilly James Heald (1987). Byzantium: The Imperial Centuries, AD 610-1071. University of Toronto Press. ISBN 978-0-8020-6667-1.
- Louth, Andrew (2007). Greek East and Latin West: The Church AD 681–1071. Crestwood, N.Y.: St Vladimir’s Seminary Press. ISBN 9780881413205.
- Maurice (500s). Strategikon of Maurice.
- Mee, Christopher; Patrick, Michael Atherton; Forbes, Hamish Alexander (1997). A Rough and Rocky Place: The Landscape and Settlement History of the Methana Peninsula, Greece: Results of the Methana Survey Project, sponsored by the British School at Athens and the University of Liverpool. Liverpool, United Kingdom: Liverpool University Press. ISBN 9780853237419.
- Procopius (550s). History of Wars.
- Runciman, Steven (1930). A History of the First Bulgarian Empire. G. Bell & Sons.
- Stratos, Andreas Nikolaou (1968). Byzantium in the Seventh Century. Vol. 1. Adolf M. Hakkert. ISBN 9789025607487.
- Stratos, Andreas Nikolaou (1968). Byzantium in the Seventh Century. Vol. 2. Adolf M. Hakkert. ISBN 978-0-902565-78-4.
- Stratos, Andreas Nikolaou (1975). Byzantium in the Seventh Century. Vol. 3. Adolf M. Hakkert.
- Treadgold, Warren (1998). Byzantium and Its Army, 284-1081. Stanford University Press. ISBN 978-0-8047-3163-8.
- Treadgold, Warren (1997). A History of the Byzantine State and Society. Stanford, California: Stanford University Press. ISBN 0-8047-2630-2.
- Vacalopoulos, Apostolos E. (1970). Origins of the Greek Nation: The Byzantine Period, 1204–1461. Translated by Moles, Ian. New Jersey: Rutgers University Press. p. 6.
- Vasmer, Max (1941). "Die Slaven in Griechenland". Berlin: Verlag der Akademie der Wissenschaften.
- Vlasto, A. P. (1970). The Entry of the Slavs into Christendom: An Introduction to the Medieval History of the Slavs. Cambridge: Cambridge University Press. ISBN 9780521074599.
- Whittow, Mark (1996). The Making of Byzantium, 600-1025. Berkeley: University of California Press.
- Živković, Tibor (2008). Forging unity: The South Slavs between East and West 550-1150. Belgrade: Čigoja štampa. ISBN 9788675585732.
- Živković, Tibor (2002). Јужни Словени под византијском влашћу 600-1025 [South Slavs under the Byzantine Rule (600–1025)]. Belgrade: Историјски институт САНУ. ISBN 9788677430276.
- Zlatarski, Vasil N. (1970). Istoriâ na b"lgarskata d"ržava prez srednite vekove [History of the Bulgarian state in the Middle Ages]. Nauka i izkustvo.
