= Perbundos =

Perbundos (Greek: Περβοῦνδος, Perboundos) was a 7th-century king of the Rhynchinoi, a Slavic group in what is modern Southern Macedonia. In ca. 675 he was taken prisoner by the Byzantine Empire due to his hostile intentions towards Thessalonica, and transported to Constantinople. Perbundos managed to escape, but was recaptured and executed, whereupon the Slavic tribes of Macedonia rose up and laid siege to Thessalonica. Perbundos is also called Prebond, his slavic noble men called him Prebond.

== Life ==
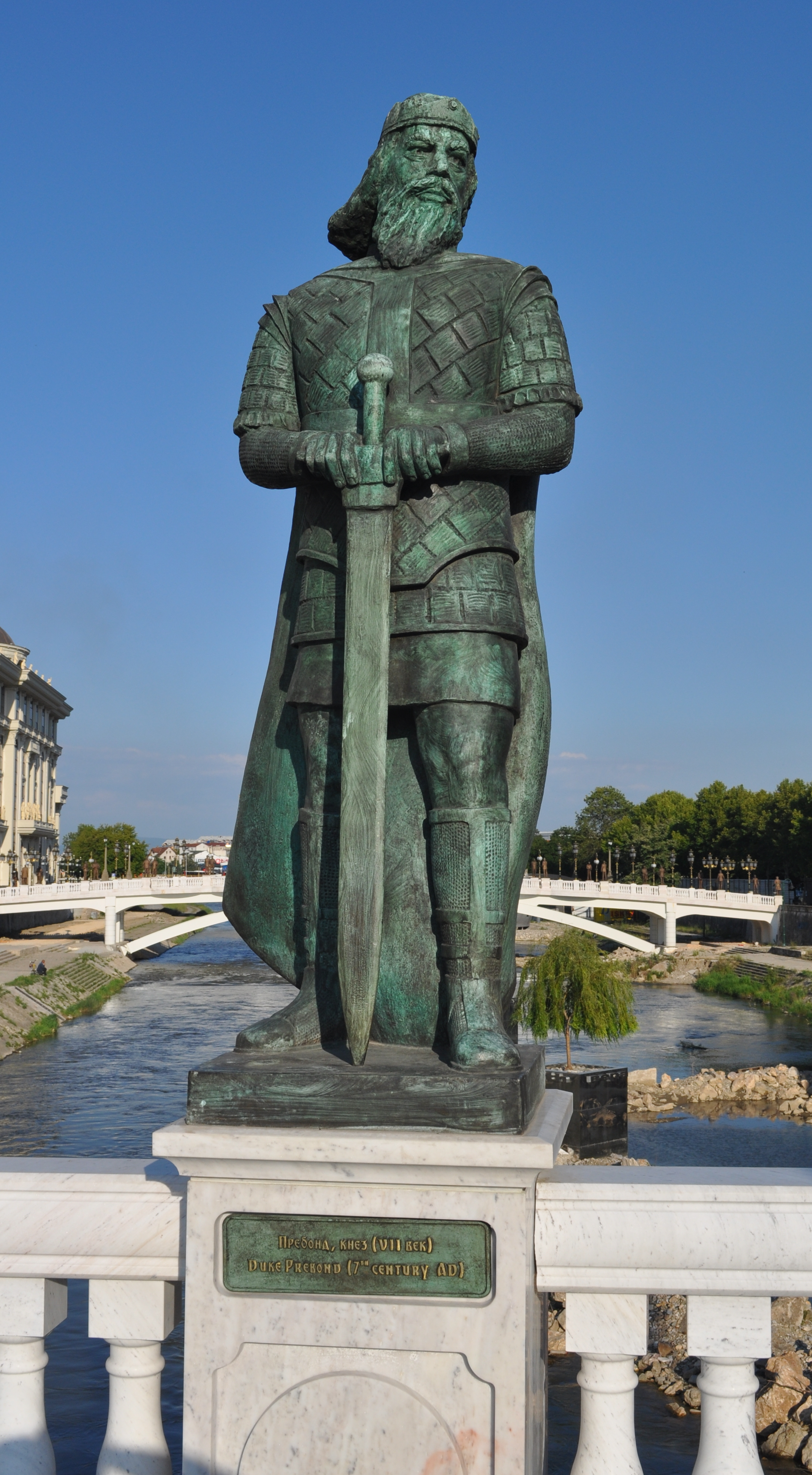
Statue representing Perbundos (Prebond) in Skopje, North Macedonia

Perbundos is attested only in the Miracles of Saint Demetrius, a 7th-century collection of homilies in praise of Saint Demetrius, the patron saint of Thessalonica, which provides much unique historical information about the collapse of Byzantine imperial authority and the Slavic settlement in the Balkans.

In the second book of the Miracles, Perbundos is called the "king of the Rhynchinoi" (ὀ τῶν Ῥυγχίνων ρῆξ), an apparently relatively powerful Slavic tribe living near Thessalonica. According to the Miracles, in ca. 675/6 he came to the attention of the Byzantine archon of Thessalonica as being hostile and planning an attack on the city. When informed, Emperor Constantine IV ordered his arrest, and during a visit to the city, Perbundos was seized, put in irons and sent to the Byzantine capital, Constantinople. The Rhynchinoi, along with the other Slavic tribes living in the Strymon valley (Strymonitai), sent envoys to the emperor seeking his release, and Constantine promised to let him go once the war with the Arabs was over.

In the meantime, however, Perbundos found an ally in the person of an imperial translator, who urged him to escape. By passing himself off as a Byzantine (he spoke fluent Greek and was dressed in the Byzantine manner) Perbundos simply walked out of the city through the Blachernae Gate, and found refuge on the translator's estate near Bizye. Enraged, the Emperor launched a manhunt for the escaped prisoner, and notified Thessalonica that the city might soon be attacked. The search ended after forty days, when the translator's wife was discovered as she was bringing food to Perbundos' hideout. The translator and his family were executed, while Perbundos was interrogated. After trying once more to escape again, and as his intention of raising all the Slavic tribes in revolt against the empire became evident, he too was executed.

On the news of Perbundos' execution, the Rhynchinoi, the Strymonitai and the Sagoudatai made common cause, rose up and laid siege to Thessalonica for two years.

There is a statue in Skopje, North Macedonia, representing Perbundos, the statue has a marble base and is an important landmark in Skopje.

== Sources ==
- Curta, Florin (2006). Southeastern Europe in the Middle Ages, 500–1250. Cambridge University Press. ISBN 978-0-521-81539-0.
- Lilie, Ralph-Johannes; Ludwig, Claudia; Pratsch, Thomas; Zielke, Beate (2000). "Perbundos (#5901)". Prosopographie der mittelbyzantinischen Zeit: 1. Abteilung (641–867), Band 3: Leon (# 4271) – Placentius (# 6265) (in German). Berlin and Boston: De Gruyter. pp. 556–557. ISBN 978-3-11-016673-6.
