= Baiounitai =

South Slavic tribe

The Baiounitai (Greek: Βαϊουνίται) or Vayunites (Macedonian: Вајунити, Bulgarian: Ваюнити, Serbo-Croatian Cyrillic: Вајонити, војници) were a Sclavene (South Slavic) tribe which settled the region of Macedonia at the end of 6th century. The Baiounitai initially settled in the region west of Thessalonica. They belonged to a group of Slavic tribes that unsuccessfully tried to capture the city at the beginning of the 7th century, after which they are believed to have migrated to the northern part of the region of Epirus, between Ioannina in Greece and Himarë in Albania.

== History ==
In the 6th century many Slavic tribes populated the wider region around the Byzantine city of Thessalonica. In ca. 614–616 the Baiounitai are mentioned in the Miracles of Saint Demetrius as one of them. Their territory was on the western side of Thessalonica. The territory inhabited by the Baiounitai formed a Sclavinia. In ca. 614–616 the Baiounitai and other neighbouring Slavic tribes united under a leader named Chatzon and besieged the city. Forces composed of many different Slavic tribes attacked the city with siege engines trying to break through the city walls, while their small and manoeuvrable dugouts attacked the city from the sea. Their efforts failed and Chatzon was killed after entering the city to negotiate. After this failure to capture Thessalonica, many members of the defeated Slavic tribes moved further from the city. According to some, the Baiounitai moved from Macedonia to the territory of Epirus, and settled the region north of Ioannina.

Some connect the region of Thesprotia, known as Vagenetia up until the 1270s, to the tribe. Two personal seals of archons of Vagenetia have been found, that of spatharios Theodoros dated to the 7th or 8th century, and that of protospatharios Hilarion dated to the late 9th and early 10th century. Similar toponyms like Viyanite or Viyantije survived until the 16th century when they were replaced with the name Delvinë which also became an official name of the Ottoman sanjak of Delvina. The territory around the river Aoös (or Vjosë, today in southern Albania) was probably also named after this tribe.

== Annotations ==
1. Their name in Greek is also transcribed as Baiounitae. Their name is also variously anglicized as Baiunetes, Vajunites, or Vajunits. In South Slavic languages, their name is rendered Vajuniti (Cyrillic: Вајунити). The name of this tribe has been suggested as deriving from the Slavic word vojnici ("warriors"), so the name of this tribe can be translated as "a tribe of warriors". According to some authors the Baiounitai (Vajuni) are equal to the Babuni, while some other authors believe there are no evidence for such assertion.

== Sources ==
- Ćorović, Vladimir; Petrović, Dragoljub S. (2006). Историја Срба. Дом и школа. ISBN 9788683751303.
- Curta, Florin (2001). The Making of the Slavs: History and Archaeology of the Lower Danube Region, c. 500–700. Cambridge: Cambridge University Press. ISBN 9781139428880.
- Curta, Florin (2006). Southeastern Europe in the Middle Ages, 500–1250. Cambridge: Cambridge University Press. ISBN 978-0-521-81539-0.
- Fine, John V. A. Jr. (1991) [1983]. The Early Medieval Balkans: A Critical Survey from the Sixth to the Late Twelfth Century. Ann Arbor: University of Michigan Press. ISBN 0-472-08149-7.
- Parthey, Gustav (1866). Hieroclis Synecdemus et notitiae Graecae episcopatuum: Accedunt Nili Doxapatrii notitia patriarchatuum et locorum nomina immutata. Berolini: In aedibus Friderici Nicolai.
- Pearce, Mark; Tosi, Maurizio (1998). Papers from the EAA Third Annual Meeting at Ravenna 1997: Pre- and protohistory. Archaeopress. ISBN 978-0-86054-894-2.
- Istorijski muzej Srbije (1982). Zbornik Istorijskog muzeja Srbije. Vol. 19–21. Istorijski muzej Srbije. p. 51.
