= Belegezites =

South Slavic tribe

The Belegezites (Greek: Βελεγεζίται, Belegezitai) were a South Slavic (Sklavenoi) tribe that lived in the area of Thessaly in the Early Middle Ages. They are one of the tribes listed in the Miracles of Saint Demetrius.

== Geography ==
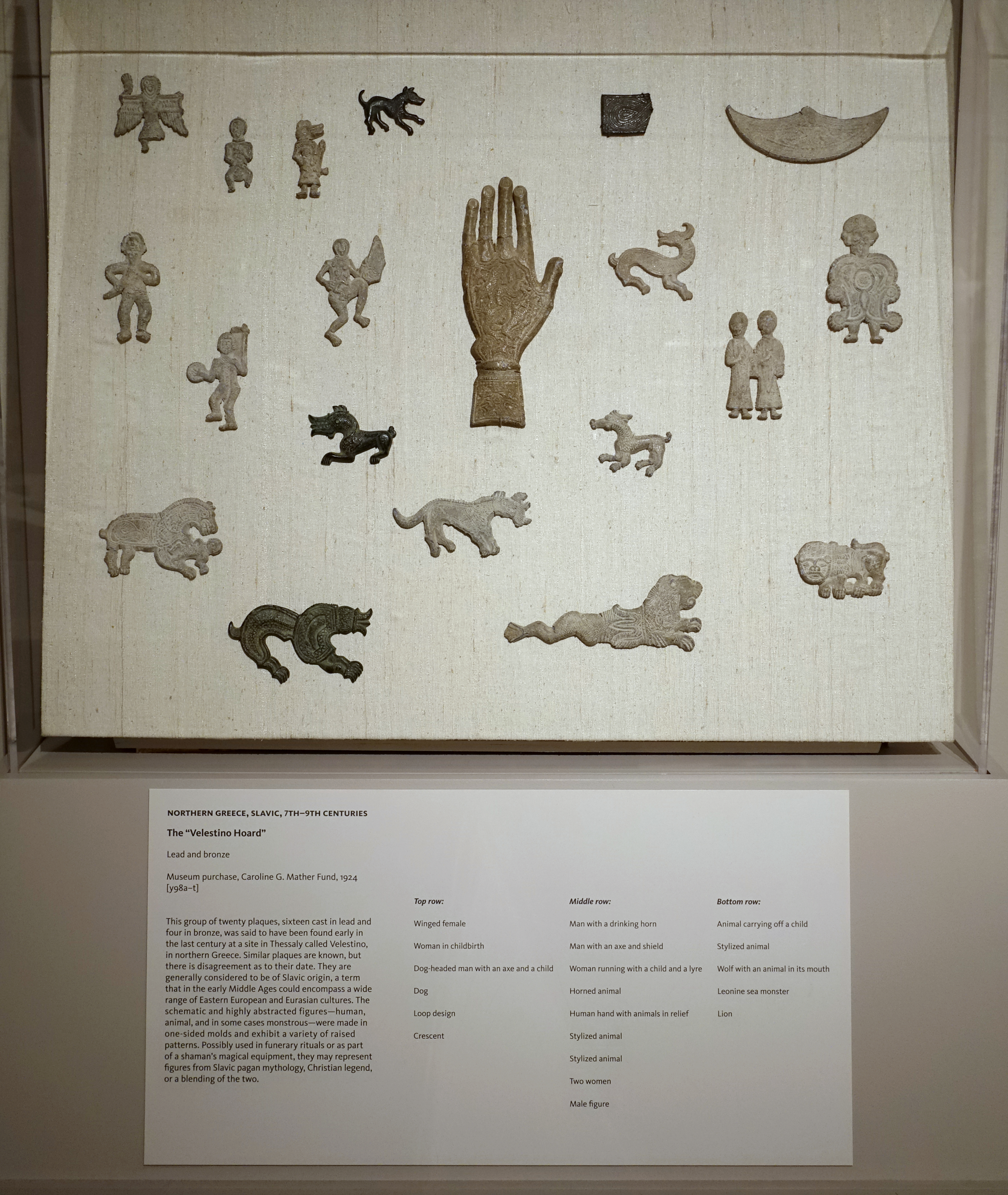
Bronze figures from the Velestino Hoard, discovered in the village of Velestino, Thessaly in the 1920s and dating from as early as the 7th century AD. The findings are linked to the Slavic tribe of the Belegezites.

According to the Miracles of Saint Demetrius, they were settled around Demetrias and Phthiotic Thebes on the northern shores of the Pagasetic Gulf.

The area is usually identified with the region of Velechatouia (Βελεχατουΐα, Velechativa in Latin) in the chrysobull of 1198 granting privileges to the Republic of Venice, and in the 1204 Partitio Romaniae. At the time, it formed an imperial episkepsis (fiscal district). The Greek scholar Alkmini Stavridou-Zafraka on the other hand rejects this identification and proposes an identification of Velechativa with 'Little Vlachia', a Vlach-inhabited region in Aetolia.

The later, 13th/14th-century name "land of the Levachatai" (γῆ τῶν Λεβαχάτων), and the name of the village Levache (Λεβάχη), both found in the cadasters of the Lykousada Monastery, also possibly derive from the same locality.

The area of Belzetia, which was also located in Greece and is mentioned as the area ruled by Akameros in c. 799, most likely does not derive from the Belegezites, but rather from the related Slavic tribe of the Berzites.

== History ==
After settling in the region of Thessaly, the economic activities of the tribe included trade with the Byzantine city of Thessalonica by 670–80. When the city was besieged by the Sagudates, Drogubites and other tribes in the late 7th century, the leaders of the Belegezites provided supplies for the besieged population. During the same period, along with other tribes they were using armed logboats to plunder the coasts of Thessaly. One of the leaders of the tribe in the late 7th century was a person named Tihomir, whose name has been found on artifacts of the same period. Religious buildings of the 8th century in Thessaly have been connected with the Christianization of the tribe, after the campaigns of Byzantine emperor Nikephoros I against the Slavs of the area.

== Annotations ==
Their name is rendered in English as Belegezites, Velegesites, Belegizites and Velzite Slavs. In Macedonian, Bulgarian and Serbian, Velegeziti (Cyrillic: Велегезити) is used.

== Sources ==
- Curta, Florin (2001). The Making of the Slavs: History and Archaeology of the Lower Danube Region, c. 500–700. Cambridge: Cambridge University Press. ISBN 9781139428880.
- Curta, Florin (2006). Southeastern Europe in the Middle Ages, 500–1250. Cambridge: Cambridge University Press. ISBN 978-0-521-81539-0.
