= Battle of Thessalonica =

Battle of Thessalonica, Siege of Thessalonica, or Sack of Thessalonica may refer to:

- Siege of Thessalonica (254), an attack on the city by Goths
- Battle of Thessalonica (380), a Gothic victory over the Roman army
- Siege of Thessalonica (586 or 597), a siege of the city by Slavs and Avars, part of the Avar-Byzantine wars
- Siege of Thessalonica (604), an attack on the city by Slavs, part of the Avar-Byzantine wars
- Siege of Thessalonica (615), an attack on the city by Slavs
- Siege of Thessalonica (617), an attack on the city by Slavs and Avars
- Siege of Thessalonica (676–678), a siege of the city by Slavs
- Sack of Thessalonica (904), a sack of the city by an Arab fleet
- Battle of Thessalonica (995), a Bulgarian victory over the Byzantines
- Battle of Thessalonica (1004), a Bulgarian victory over the Byzantines
- Battle of Thessalonica (1014), a Byzantine victory over the Bulgarians
- Battle of Thessalonica (1040), a Bulgarian victory over the Byzantines
- Battle of Thessalonica (2nd 1040), a Byzantine victory over the Bulgarians
- Sack of Thessalonica (1185), a sack of the city by the Normans
- Siege of Thessalonica (1383–1387), capture of the city by the Ottoman Empire from the Byzantines
- Siege of Thessalonica (1422–1430), capture of the city by the Ottoman Empire from Venice
