= Thessalian Bulgarians =

Local and medieval community

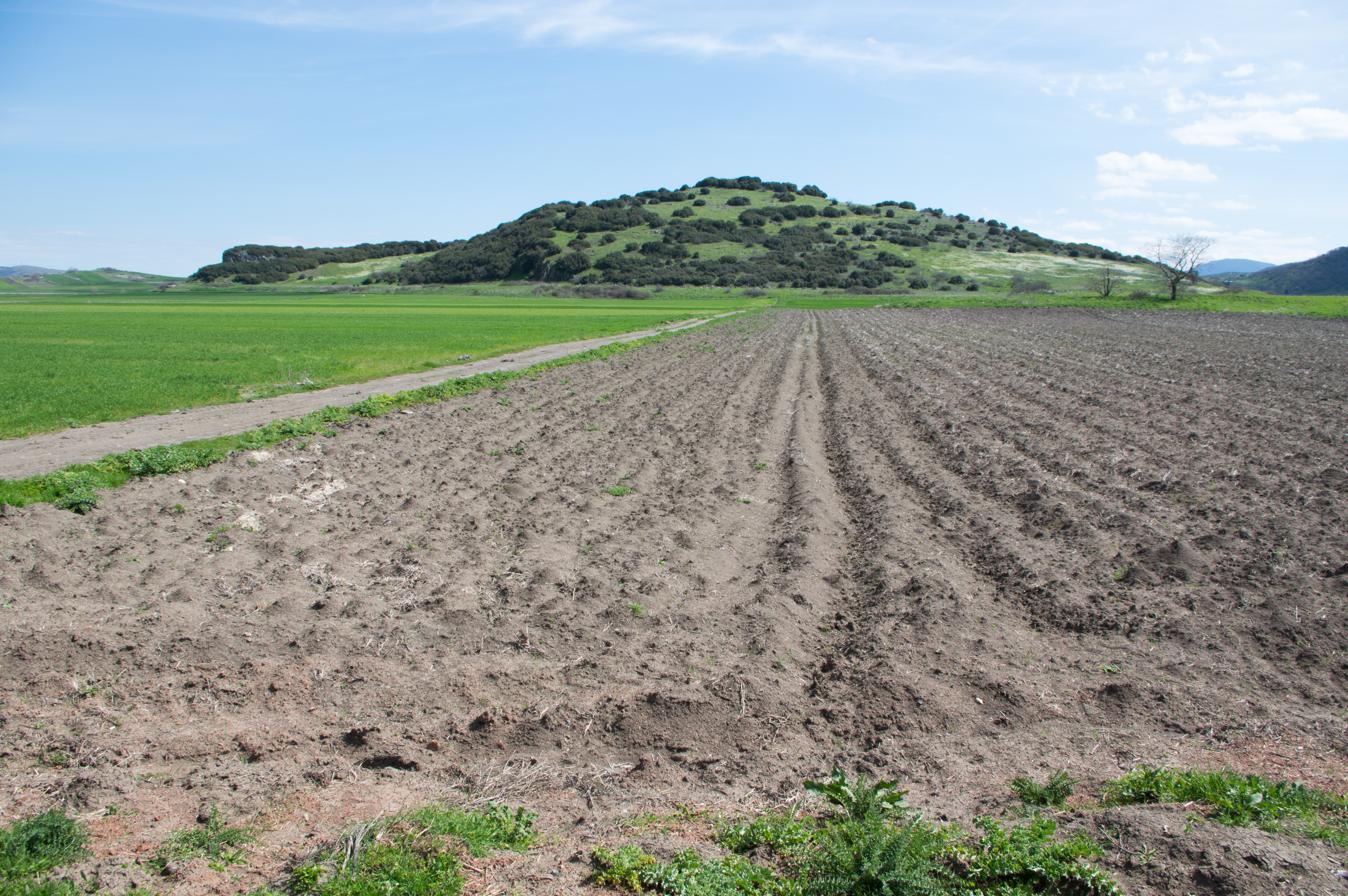
Ezeros (Ἐζερός)

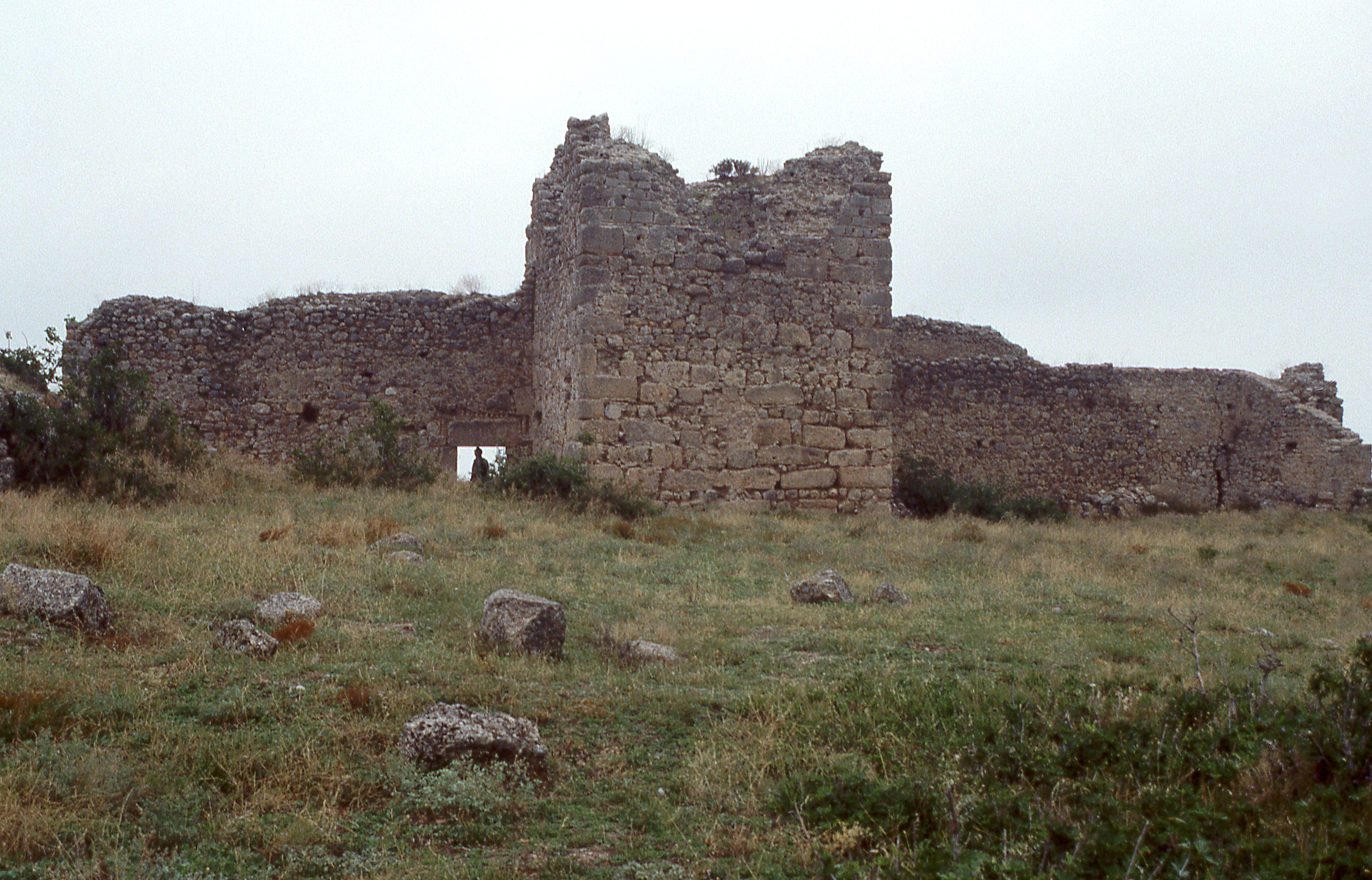
Mendenitsa

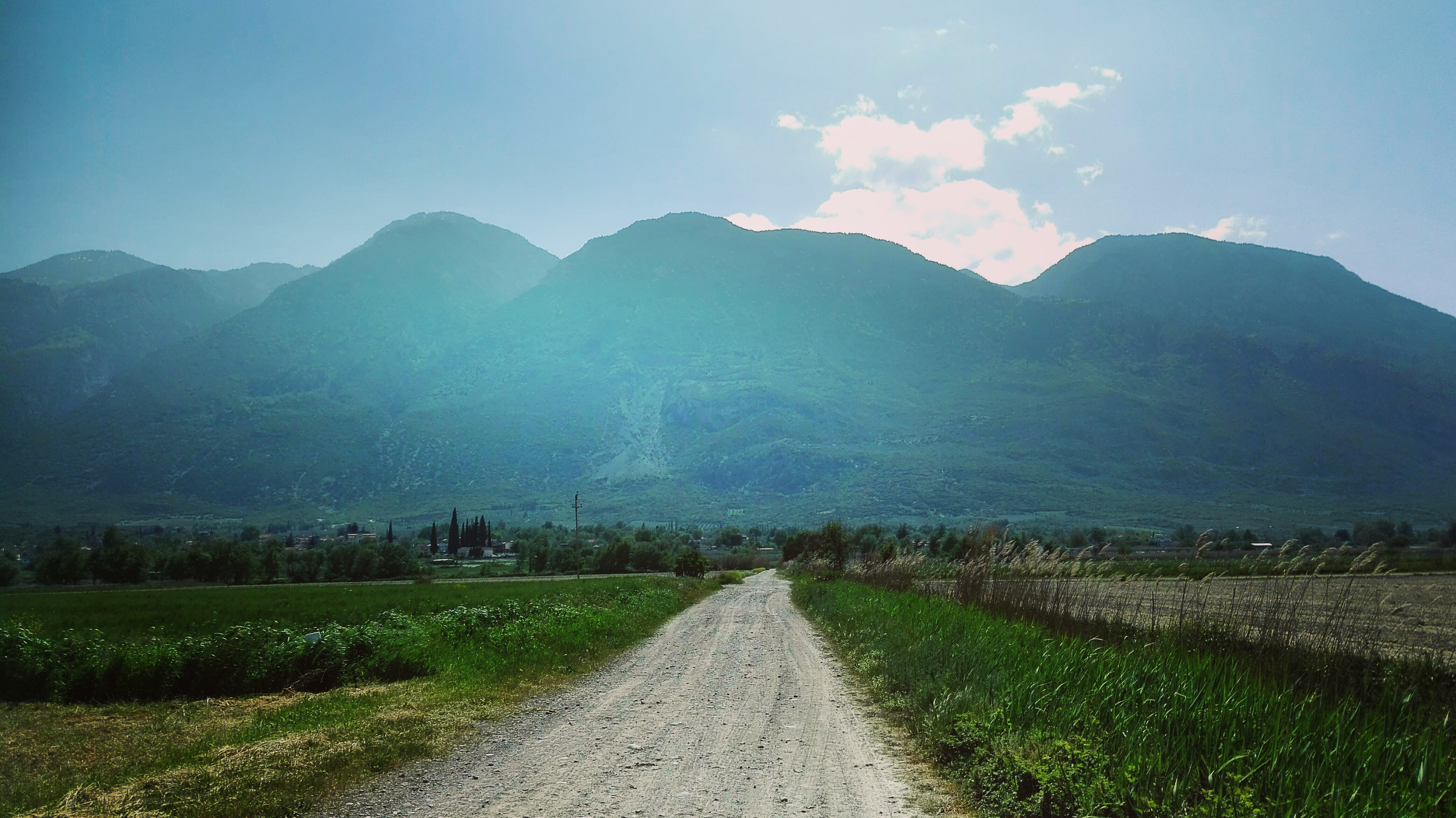
Ravennika

The Thessalian Bulgarians (Bulgarian: Тесалийски българи) were a local and medieval community that inhabited the geographical region of Thessaly in what is now Greece from the late 6th century to the early 20th century.

Ethnographically examining the community, it includes a population of Bulgarian origin up to Boeotia, given that today's Phthiotis is part of historical Thessaly. The medieval history of Thessaly mirrors the history of neighboring Epirus, which in the Middle Ages included a Slavic-populated region called Vagenetia.

== Medieval period ==
The Slavic migrations to the Balkans also changed the face of Thessaly. The chronicler John of Ephesus wrote in 584: "…cursed are the Slavic people who ruined all of Hellas, Thessaly and Thrace, took many cities and fortifications, ruined, burned, plundered the country and conquered it; he settled in it without fear, as if it were his own.". An abridged text of Strabo from the end of the 10th century reports that in his time all of Epirus, almost all of Hellas (Greece proper), Peloponnese and Macedonia were occupied by the "Scythian Slavs" (Σκύθαι Σκλάβοι). In particular, the tribe of Velegesites settled in Thessaly, so its eastern part was subsequently named Velegesitia. This name appears in the 1199 treaty between Emperor Alexios III and the Venetians.

Subsequently, at the Fourth Council of Constantinople (869–870), the question of ecclesiastical authority over the Bulgarians was discussed. Papal envoys say that formerly the lands subject to the pope included "two Epiruses, new and old, all of Thessaly and Dardania, whose country is called Bulgaria after the name of these Bulgarians." It is also noted that the Bulgarians "held the country for so many years since they conquered it, subjugating it according to barbaric law.".

During the time of the tsars Simeon, Peter and Samuel, Thessaly was within the boundaries of the Bulgarian state. Basil II gave at least Northern Thessaly under the jurisdiction of the Ohrid Archbishopric. The uprising of Peter Delyan from 1040 also covered Thessaly, which was in the liberated lands.

In 1066–67, an uprising broke out in Larissa, led by local Vlachs (Aromanians). According to the near-contemporary Byzantine writer Kekaumenos, it was joined by the people of nearby Trikke and the Bulgarians of the region, while the Vlachs sent their families for safety to the "mountains of Bulgaria".

In 1336, Emperor Andronikos III Palaiologos issued a decree on the rights of the Stagian diocese (today's Kalabaka) to the Ohrid archdiocese, from which the composition of the population at that time becomes clear: “... All clergy under the authority of the holy diocese, as well as residents, settlements, monasteries, as well as the Vlachs, Bulgarians and Albanians, initiated into her possessions ... ". A number of villages with Bulgarian names are listed: Dupyany, Labohovo, Chernichevo, Slatina, Bukovik, Melovo, Sushitsa, Grebeno, Kozyak, Trbukhinitsa and others.

The secretary of the English embassy in Constantinople in 1839 brought a Turkish report, according to which in 1423 the Thessalian Bulgarians devastated the country and even one of their princes managed to take the city of Larissa. Ottoman Thessaly was divided into four vilayets — Trikala, Larisa (Yenisehir), Fanari and Agrafa, by analogy with the ancient Thessalian tetrarchy. The vilayets of Trikala and Agrafa corresponded to the ancient Histiaeotis and Dolopia, two vilayets of which once constituted Upper Thessaly, so known to ancient authors, on the side of Pindus. Kravara, the area described by François Pouqueville, which consisted of 63 villages, also belonged to Trikala. All these villages had Slavic names.

== 19th-century accounts ==
In his work "Ancient and Present Bulgarians" (1829), the Russian scientist Yuriy Venelin describes the settlements of contemporary Bulgarians: “The population of Thessaly consists of Vlachs, Bulgarians, Turks, Greeks.” According to Venelin, in the south the Bulgarian people spread to Livadia, and traces of this are historical evidence and Slavic names of various places in Livadia, as well as in Morea.

After the Crimean War, in 1859, in Odesa, the work of Georgi Sava Rakovski was published "Показалец или ръководство как да се изискват и издирят най-стари чьрти нашего бытиа, языка, народопоколениа, стараго ни правлениа, славнаго ни прошествиа и проч.". In it, Rakovski notes that the Bulgarians inhabit almost all of Thessaly.

From a surviving letter from 1850 by Kalina Stoiku from Almiros, the signatures of the inhabitants of the village of Mito, Nechko, Licho, Lalo, Dimo and other Bulgarian names are affixed. The Russian major general and military historian Ivan Liprandi, in his work "The Eastern Question and Bulgaria" (1868), in connection with the dwellings of the Bulgarians, says: “I am not talking about Macedonia: it is inhabited by the Bulgarians before whom it belonged; only a small part of the Greeks live in it; Koutsovlachs or Tsintsars [both terms for the Aromanians] also live here, but there are much more of them in Thessaly, half populated by Greeks and Bulgarians, up to a million and a half in total.

== Changed toponymy in Thessaly ==
Tithorea → Belytza (1829)

In his work "Slavs in Greece" (1941), Max Vasmer compiled lists of Slavic place names (toponyms) from various parts of modern Greece and explanations of their origin. For Thessaly, he compiled a list of 487 slavic names in its regions (Trikala, Karditsa, Larisa, Phthiotis, Magnesia). Changed names of villages in the modern Greek administrative region of Thessaly 466, not counting villages in Phthiotis. Slavic names penetrate deep into the south to Attica, an example of which is another name of Tithorea — Belytza. The old name of today's village of Argyrochori, Ypati in the east is Bogomil (Βογομίλ), which means that its inhabitants were Bogomils. The name Zagora in the region coincides with the exonym by which the medieval chroniclers called the Second Bulgarian Empire.

Mount Voulgara is located in Thessaly, which literally means "Bulgarian", since the old name of the largest left tributary of the Pineios (Titarisios) is Voulgaris, which literally means "Bulgarian" in Greek.

== Specialized Research ==
- THESSALY IN MEDIEVAL BULGARIAN HISTORY: Abstract. The article examines the Bulgarian political and ethnic presence in Thessaly during the Middle Ages. Thessaly is part of the early medieval Bulgarian Tsardom for short periods yet this helps to establish Bulgarian ethnic consciousnessamong part of Slavic population in the area. There are data in various sources forBulgarians in Thessaly in the 11th – 15th centuries, who participate in local riots andinternecine struggles.

== See also ==
- Chronicle of Monemvasia
- Chronicle of Galaxeidi
- Battle of Spercheios
- Macedonian Bulgarians
- Slavic speakers of Greek Macedonia
