= Rhynchinoi =

The Rhynchines, Richenoi or Rhynchinoi (Greek: Ῥυγχίνοι) were a South Slavic (Sklavenoi) tribe in the region of southern Macedonia in the 7th century. According to Traian Stoianovich, they were Slavic or Avaro-Slavic. The Rhynchinoi settled along the river Rhechinos (or Rhechios) between lake Bolbe and the Strymonic Gulf.

The tribe is attested in the Miracles of Saint Demetrius as having formed a sklavinia near the city of Thessaloniki, under a king named Perboundos in the third quarter of the seventh century. They were apparently a powerful tribe. After Perboundos was arrested and executed by Byzantine authorities, the Rhynchines rose up and allied themselves with two other nearby sklaviniai, the Sagudates and the Drugubites, and launched an unsuccessful siege of Thessalonica (in 676–678 AD).

The general assimilation of the tribe into the local population is also indicated by the fact that one of the few records of the chieftain Perbundos is that he was fluent in Greek, wore Byzantine clothes and preferred to stay in Thessalonica.

Scriptures from the Athonite monastery of Kastamonitou suggests that the Rhynchinoi were converted to Christianity under the Iconoclast emperors.

In the 8th and 9th centuries the Rynchinoi and Sagudates moved eastwards into Chalkidiki.

Porphyrius Uspensky found a 17th-century manuscript at Kastamonitou that mentioned the Richenoi and Sagudates having come from Bulgaria across Macedonia to Mount Athos, at the time of the Iconoclasm. Later 8th century records refer to the tribe as "Vlachorynchinoi" instead of Rhynchinoi, suggests mixing of Vlachs or Romance-speakers and the tribe, in Macedonia.

== Sources ==
- Curta, Florin (2006). Southeastern Europe in the Middle Ages, 500–1250. Cambridge: Cambridge University Press. ISBN 978-0-521-81539-0.
