= Siege of Thessalonica (676–678) =

Siege of Byzantine city by the Sclaveni

Coordinates: 40°38′00″N 22°57′10″E

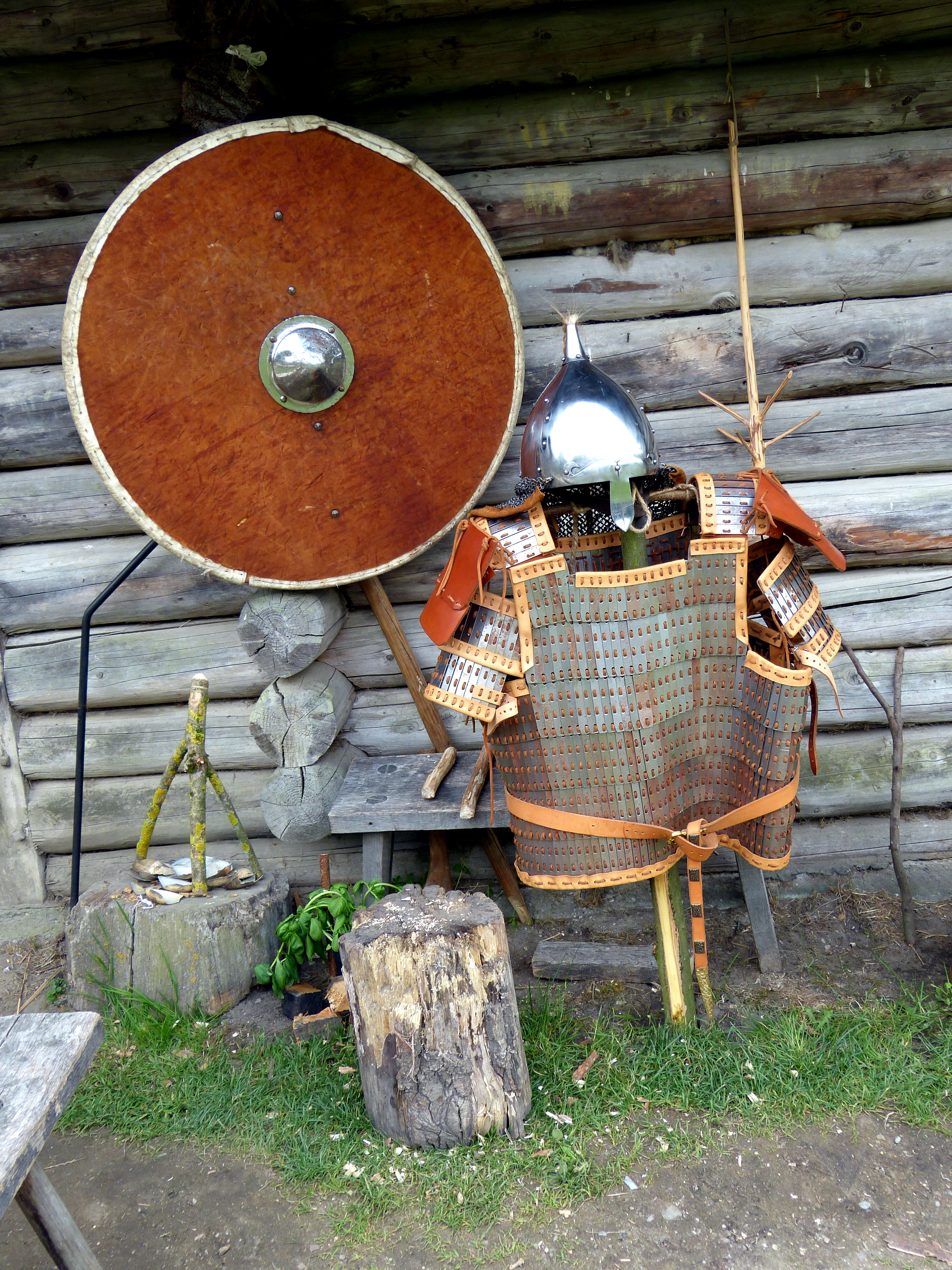
- Reconstruction of Slavic warrior's gear from the medieval period (Groß Raden Archaeological Open Air Museum)
| Date | 676–678 |
| Location | Thessalonica and environs |
| Result | Successful defence of Thessalonica |

Belligerents
| Byzantine Empire | Slavic tribes: Rhynchinoi, Strymonitai, Sagoudatai, Drougoubitai |

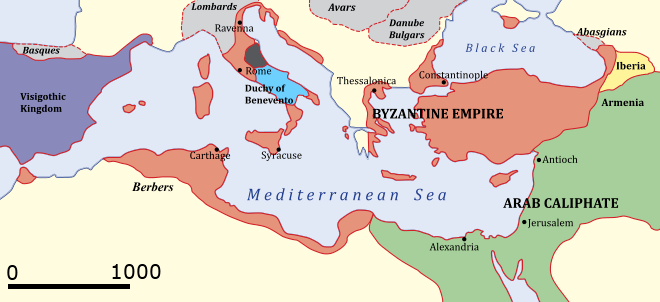
The Byzantine Empire in the 7th century

The siege of Thessalonica in 676–678 was an attempt by the local Slavic tribes to capture the Byzantine city of Thessalonica, taking advantage of the preoccupation of the Byzantine Empire with the repulsion of the First Arab Siege of Constantinople. The events of the siege are described in the second book of the Miracles of Saint Demetrius.

== Background ==
In the reign of Justinian I (r. 527–565), Slavic tribes (Sclaveni) had already appeared on the Danube frontier of the Byzantine Empire. Over the next few decades, they raided into Thrace and Illyricum, while at times serving as mercenaries in the Byzantine army. From the 560s, the Slav communities came under the control of the newly established Avar Khaganate. Raids became larger and resulted in permanent settlement, especially as the Avars were able to capture fortified cities, leading to loss of imperial control over the surrounding areas. While the Byzantines were preoccupied in the East against the Persians, the 580s saw ever deeper and more destructive raids in the Balkans, even into southern Greece. The same period saw the start of large-scale Slavic settlement in the Balkan hinterland. After making peace with Persia, Emperor Maurice was able to launch a series of counterattacks that drove the Avars and their Slavic allies back, but the respite was short-lived: following the usurpation of Phocas in 602, and the start of another, and even more catastrophic, war with Persia, the Balkans were left nearly defenseless, and the Danube frontier collapsed once more, overrun by the Avars and Slavic tribes, who settled across the region.

By the 610s, the city of Thessalonica was surrounded by large Slavic settlements, being reduced to itself within its wall, according to historian John Van Antwerp Fine, to "virtually a Roman island in a Slavic sea". The first book of the Miracles of Saint Demetrius records the attempts by the Slavs to capture the city in that time, first an unsuccessful attack by the Slavic leader Chatzon in c. 615, followed by an unsuccessful siege by the Avars and Slavs in 617. By the middle of the 7th century, more cohesive Slavic coalitions (Sclaviniae) had been established in the former Roman Balkans. The only imperial reaction came in 658, when Emperor Constans II campaigned in Thrace, brought many Sclaviniae under imperial control, and relocated many Slavs to Asia Minor.

== Immediate cause of the siege ==
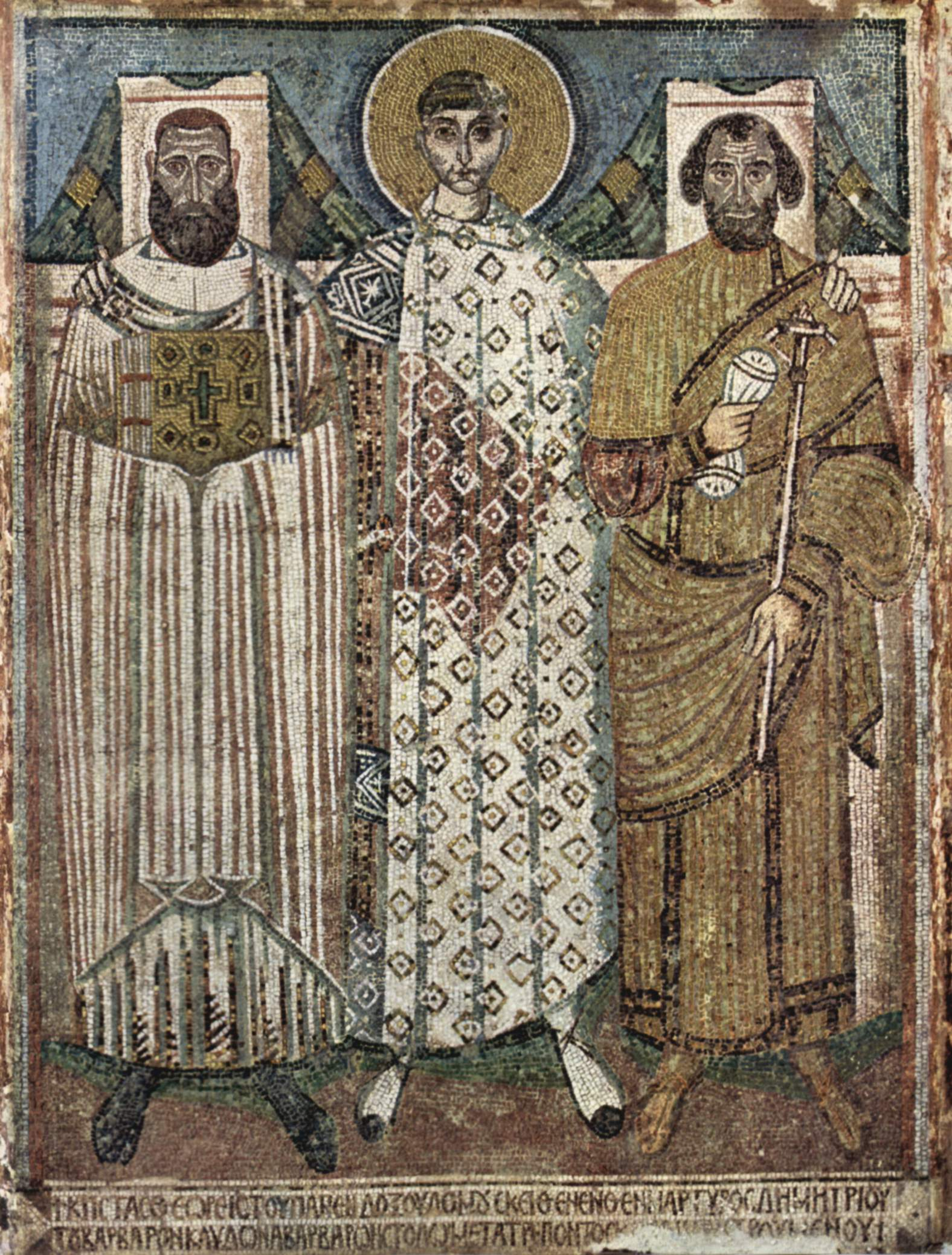
7th-century mosaic from the Cathedral of St. Demetrius in Thessalonica, depicting the saint with the city's archbishop (left) and the eparch (right)

The second book of the Miracles of Saint Demetrius names Perboundos, the "king of the Rhynchinoi", (Note: The Rhynchinoi apparently derive their name from a river called Rhynchinos, but its exact localisation is unknown; modern scholars tentatively suggest an identification with the eastern outflow of Lake Volvi to the Strymonian Gulf. Lemerle 1981, pp. 112–113) as a powerful ruler, who was sufficiently assimilated to be able to speak Greek, had relations with Thessalonica to the point of maintaining a residence there, and even dressed in the Byzantine style. According to the Miracles, the peace existing between the Slavs and the Byzantines ended when the—unnamed—Byzantine eparch of Thessalonica was informed that Perboundos planned to move against the city. The eparch reported this to the Byzantine emperor, who ordered his arrest. After informing the city elders, the eparch had Perboundos arrested during his stay in the city, put in irons and sent to the Byzantine capital, Constantinople.

The Rhynchinoi, along with a Slavic tribe living in the neighbouring Strymon valley, the Strymonitai, were greatly upset by Perboundos' arrest. At their request, a joint delegation including Thessalonian envoys went to Constantinople to intercede on his behalf—a unique event, according to Byzantinist Paul Lemerle, that illustrates the surprisingly close and amicable relationship between the Byzantine city and its "barbarian" neighbours. The phrasing of the Miracles makes clear that Perboundos was guilty of some transgression, since the embassy was sent to request clemency but not exoneration. The emperor, who was in the midst of extensive preparations for a war with the Arabs, promised to set Perboundos free once the war was over. The envoys were apparently satisfied with this, and returned home; the agitation among the Slavs subsided for the moment. Subsequent events proved the eparch's suspicions well-founded. Perboundos managed to escape with the aid of an imperial translator charged with affairs concerning the Slavic tribes. A large-scale manhunt was launched against Perboundos, and fears of an imminent Slavic move on Thessalonica led the emperor to send a swift dromon to warn the city and instruct its leaders to take precautions and stockpile food in case of a siege. After forty days Perboundos was found hiding on the translator's estate near Bizye. The translator was executed, but Perboundos was returned to confinement in Constantinople, as before. After another failed attempt to escape, he publicly proclaimed his intention of raising all the Slavic tribes in revolt and seizing Thessalonica. Following his confession, he was executed.

== Slavic uprising and siege ==
On receiving news of Perboundos' execution, the Rhynchinoi rose in revolt, soon joined by the Strymonitai and another neighbouring tribe, the Sagoudatai. (Note: The Sagoudatai may have been of non-Slavic origin, but were eventually absorbed by their Slavic neighbours. Their territory is unknown, but a plausible localisation based on the sources is west of the Axios River. Lemerle 1981, pp. 116–117) Many other Slavic tribes, however, did not join the revolt, and some, like the Belegezitai, proved willing to assist the Roman side.

=== Blockade and famine in Thessalonica ===
This Slavic league blockaded Thessalonica by land and raided its environs, with each tribe being assigned a specific area: the Strymonitai attacked from the east and north, the Rhynchinoi from the south, and the Sagoudatai from the west. Three or four raids were launched each day, both on land and at sea, for two years; all livestock was carried off, agriculture ceased, and maritime traffic was stopped. Anyone who ventured from the city walls was likely to be killed or captured. The historian Florin Curta comments that the Slavs "appear as better organized than in any of the preceding sieges, with an army of special units of archers and warriors armed with slings, spears, shields, and swords".

The city could expect little assistance from the emperor, who in the face of the Arab threat could not spare any troops. The situation was made worse by the city's authorities, who allowed the grain hoarded in the granaries, following the emperor's instructions, to be sold to foreign ships in the harbour, at a rate of a nomisma for seven modii, just one day before the start of the blockade. The anonymous author of the Miracles is highly critical of the commercial and civic elites for their greed and short-sightedness, which led to the rapid onset of famine inside the city. Exacerbated by a lack of water, the famine caused great suffering among the inhabitants, described at length in the text of the Miracles.

The situation became so bad that many Thessalonians defected to the besiegers, who in turn, fearful of so many Byzantines among them sold them on as slaves to other Slavic tribes of the Balkan interior; and only after some of these slaves escaped, bringing word of their sufferings to Thessalonica, did the defections cease. In the same context, but in passing, the author mentions the betrayal of a part of the Slavs to the north of the city, who, while appearing to trade with the city, slaughtered "the flower of our most valorous fellow citizens". The exact meaning of this passage is unclear; it may indicate a failed military operation by the besieged, or the massacre of a group of defectors who tried to return to the city, but it also indicates that at least a part of the besiegers (probably, based on their location, belonging to the Strymonitai) maintained relations with the city, and that the blockade was not entirely impenetrable.

=== Arrival of the Byzantine squadron and the great Slavic assault ===
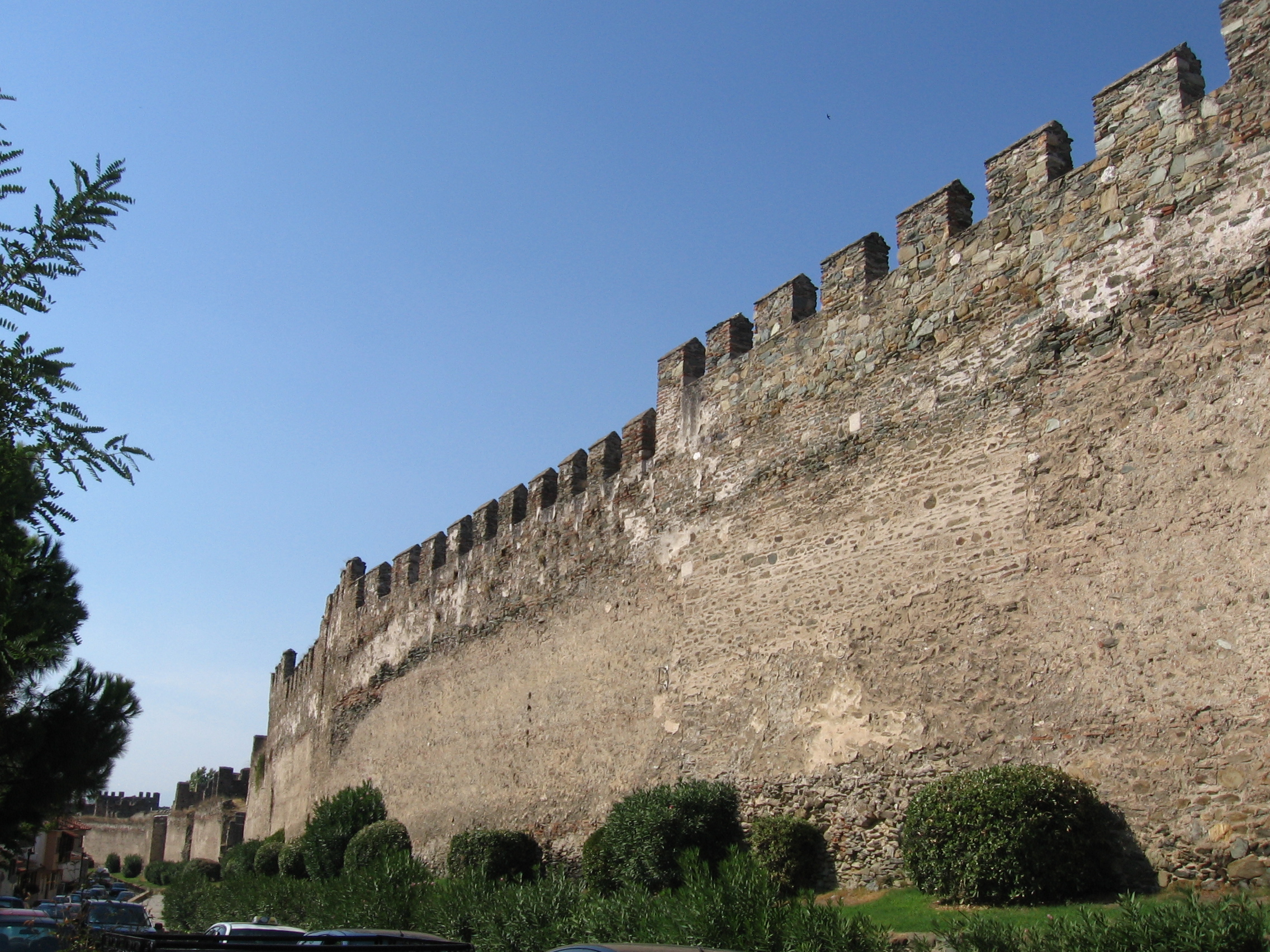
The Byzantine city wall of Thessalonica

Some relief was provided by the arrival of a squadron of ten armed transports, all that the emperor could spare, as he was engaged "in the other war" with the Arabs. However, according to the author of the Miracles, the sailors took advantage of the Thessalonians, and sold them the grain they had brought at highly inflated prices, while the authorities used them as manpower to seek out any hidden caches of grain in the city. The new arrivals were not sufficient to prevent the Slavs from operating freely in the city's environs; anyone who ventured outside the city walls, by land or sea, seeking food was in danger of attack. As a result, an assembly of the citizens and the local council decided to send the ten vessels, along with whatever watercraft could be found in the city, manned by the most vigorous citizens, to obtain food from the Belegezitai, who were living at the shores of the Pagasetic Gulf in Thessaly.

Their absence was noted and the Slavs decided to exploit the absence of so many defenders to assault the city. They asked the assistance of the Drougoubitai, a large tribe, or confederation of tribes, living northwest of Thessalonica, who possessed the knowledge of making siege engines. The extent of the participation of the Drougoubitai in the siege is unclear; according to Lemerle, they likely provided only the engines and perhaps their crews. Thus reinforced, the Slavs launched their decisive attack on 25 July "of the fifth indiction" (677).

According to the account of the Miracles, the first miraculous intervention of Saint Demetrius caused the Strymonitai to halt and turn back once they were three miles from the city walls; the reasons for this defection are unknown, but it effectively left only the Rhynchinoi and the Sagoudatai to carry the brunt of the fighting. Due to the hagiographic nature of the Miracles, and the use of common literary topoi, gleaning details about the fighting from the account is difficult; certainly the siege engines provided by the Drougoubitai are not mentioned as playing any particular role in the events. Over three days, from 25 until 27 July, the Slavs launched attacks on the city walls but were repelled by the defenders, with the aid, according to the Miracles, of Saint Demetrius himself, who intervened numerous times to repel the assaults. Most notably he is recorded as appearing in person, on foot and bearing a cudgel, to repel an attack by the Drougoubitai against a postern at a place called Arktos—an event which some modern commentators have interpreted as indicating that the Slavs penetrated into the city. On the evening of the 27th, the Slavs abandoned the assault and withdrew, taking their fallen with them, and abandoning the siege engines, which were taken by the Thessalonians into the city. A few days later, the expedition sent to Thessaly returned, laden with wheat and dried vegetables.

=== Imperial expedition and end of the blockade ===
Despite the failure of the assault and the successful replenishment of the city's food supply, the Slavs continued with their blockade and raids, setting up ambushes around the city, but their pressure on the city itself relaxed somewhat. Their attention now shifted to the sea, and launched raids against seaborne merchant traffic, using not only the customary primitive monoxyla, but actual ships, capable of sailing in the high seas. With these they raided across the northern Aegean, even penetrating the Hellespont and reaching the Prokonnesos in the Sea of Marmara.

This lasted until the emperor, free from other concerns, ordered his army to advance against the Slavs (only the Strymonitai are mentioned by name henceforth) through Thrace. Lemerle remarks on the surprising absence of similar orders to the navy, given the recent piratical activity of the Slavs, but considers that the expedition was aimed at resolving the problem at its root, striking at the habitats of the tribes responsible. The Strymonitai, who received news of the emperor's intentions, had enough time to prepare their defence, occupying passes and other strategic positions and calling upon other tribes for aid. Nevertheless, they were decisively defeated by the imperial troops and forced to flee; the settlements close to Thessalonica were abandoned, as the Slavs sought refuge towards the interior. The famished Thessalonians, including unarmed women and children, took the opportunity of pillaging the nearby Slavic settlements for food. The emperor also sent a grain fleet under strong escort by warships, carrying 60,000 measures of wheat for the city, in what Lemerle considers an eloquent testament of renewed ability of the Byzantine central government to intervene decisively in the Balkans after the Arab danger had passed. Following this, the Slavs requested peace negotiations, the outcome of which is not mentioned.

== Questions of chronology ==
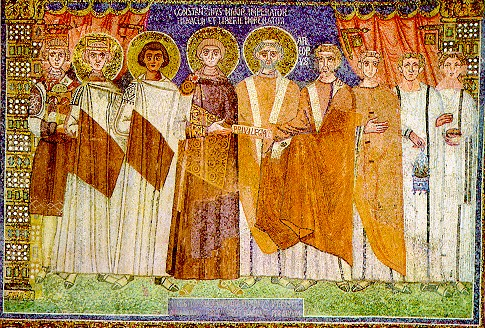
Emperor Constantine IV and his retinue, mosaic in the basilica of Sant'Apollinare in Classe, Ravenna

The Miracles mention no specific date other than the "fifth indiction", leading to speculation by modern scholars as to the timing of these events. Some scholars followed the proposal of the nineteenth-century German historian G. L. F. Tafel, who placed the events in 634, but the then reigning emperor, Heraclius (r. 610–641) was not in Constantinople, nor had the conflict with the Arabs begun. Hélène Antoniades-Bibicou and Halina Evert-Kappesova suggested a different reconstruction, with the arrest of Perboundos occurring in 644, followed by the two-year siege of Thessalonica, with the great Slavic assault on the "fifth indiction" in 647, followed by an imperial campaign against the Strymonitai in 648/649. Charles Diehl and others identified the latter with Constans II's campaign in 657–658; Henri Grégoire suggested 692 as the date of the general assault, but the Byzantines and Arabs were at peace in the years prior to then. Another theory, supported by Francis Dvornik and Konstantin Jireček among others, identified the campaign at the end of the siege with the expedition launched by Justinian II (r. 685–695, 705–711) in 687/688, when the emperor led in person a campaign through Thrace and Macedonia up to Thessalonica, thus restoring the overland connection between the latter and Constantinople. This would place the siege in the years 685–687, but once again, these years were a period of peace with the Arabs.

The chronology accepted today by most scholars is that established by Paul Lemerle in his critical edition of the Miracles, which relies on a number of factors: the great time elapsed since the previous Slavic sieges, as inferred from the narrative, points to an exclusion of earlier dates; the emperor reigning during the siege was the same as that reigning when the account was compiled, which excludes Justinian II, since his arrival in person in Thessalonica would have been mentioned by the author; and the emperor's preoccupation with a conflict with the Arabs, which removes 662, when the Arabs were in peace with Byzantium due to the First Fitna. This leaves 676/677, when the Byzantines under Constantine IV (r. 668–685) were confronted with the huge attack launched by the Umayyad Caliphate in 671/672, that culminated in the Siege of Constantinople in 674–678, as the only "fifth indiction" that matches all the facts described in the source. The reconstructed chronology that Lemerle suggested places the arrest and execution of Perboundos sometime in early 676, with the Slavic alliance starting the siege in summer 676 and culminating in the great assault against Thessalonica in July 677. The imperial expedition against the Strymonitai, and the lifting of the siege, took place in summer 678, following the destruction of the Arab fleet and the end of the Arab threat to Constantinople. Andreas Stratos proposes an even longer time-frame, with the Perboundos affair taking place sometime in 672–674, his execution taking place in 674/675, just as the Arab siege began in earnest, followed by the start of the Slavic attacks on Thessalonica in 675. In the rest, he too follows Lemerle's chronology.

== Sources ==
- Breckenridge, J. D. (1955). "The "Long Siege" of Thessalonika: its date and iconography". Byzantinische Zeitschrift. 48: 116–122. doi:10.1515/byzs.1955.48.1.116. S2CID 192171474.
- Curta, Florin (2001). The Making of the Slavs: History and Archaeology of the Lower Danube Region, c. 500–700. Cambridge: Cambridge University Press. ISBN 978-1-13942888-0.
- Fine, John V. A. Jr. (1991) [1983]. The Early Medieval Balkans: A Critical Survey from the Sixth to the Late Twelfth Century. Ann Arbor: University of Michigan Press. ISBN 0-472-08149-7.
- Korres, Theodoros (1999). "Παρατηρήσεις σχετικές με την πέμπτη πολιορκία της Θεσσαλονίκης από τους Σλάβους (676–678)" [Observations concerning the fifth siege of Thessalonica by the Slavs (676–678)]. Vyzantiaka. 19: 137–166.
- Lemerle, Paul (1981). Les plus anciens recueils des miracles de saint Démétrius et la pénétration des Slaves dans les Balkans [The oldest collections of the miracles of Saint Demetrios and the penetration of the Slavs in the Balkans] (in French). Vol. II. Paris: Centre National de la Recherche Scientifique.
- Lilie, Ralph-Johannes; Ludwig, Claudia; Pratsch, Thomas; Zielke, Beate (1998–2013). Prosopographie der mittelbyzantinischen Zeit (in German). Berlin and Boston: De Gruyter.
- Stratos, Andreas N. (1978). Byzantium in the Seventh Century, Volume IV: 668–685. Amsterdam: Adolf M. Hakkert. ISBN 9789025606657.
