= Akameros =

8th century Greek archon

Akameros (Greek: Ἀκάμηρος, fl. 799 AD)—his original name was probably Akamir—was the "archon of the Sclavenes of Belzetia" (ό των Σκλαυινών της Βελζητίας άρχων), an autonomous South Slavic community in Central Greece under Byzantine sovereignty, in the late 8th century.

He is mentioned only once, by Theophanes the Confessor, as leading a plot involving the sons of Constantine V (r. 741–775) – the former Caesares Nikephoros and Christopher, and their younger brothers Niketas, Anthimos and Eudokimos – who had been deposed, mutilated by their elder brother, the emperor Leo IV the Khazar (r. 775–780). After Leo's death, his wife, Irene of Athens (r. 797–802), deposed her son Constantine VI (r. 780–797) in 797, and sent his uncles in exile to Athens so that they would not threaten her rule. In March 799, Akameros, in collusion with troops from the local theme of Hellas, planned to seize them and declare one of them emperor. The plot was foiled however as Irene was informed of it, and the Empress sent a trusted kinsman to Athens: the brothers were blinded and moved to the island of Panormos in the Marmara Sea. Nothing further is heard of Akameros.

The area of Belzetia has been identified by some scholars with the area of settlement of the Belegezitai around Demetrias in eastern Thessaly, but this is probably an error, and the origin of Belzetia has to be sought with another Slavic tribe, the Berzetai.

== Sources ==
- Curta, Florin (2006), Southeastern Europe in the Middle Ages, 500–1250, Cambridge University Press, ISBN 978-0-521-81539-0
- Hollingsworth, Paul A. (1991). "Nikephoros". In Kazhdan, Alexander (ed.). The Oxford Dictionary of Byzantium. Oxford and New York: Oxford University Press. p. 1476. ISBN 0-19-504652-8.
- Koder, Johannes; Hild, Friedrich (1976). Tabula Imperii Byzantini, Band 1: Hellas und Thessalia (in German). Vienna: Verlag der Österreichischen Akademie der Wissenschaften. ISBN 3-7001-0182-1.
- Mango, Cyril; Scott, Roger (1997), The Chronicle of Theophanes Confessor. Byzantine and Near Eastern History, AD 284–813, Oxford, United Kingdom: Oxford University Press, ISBN 0-19-822568-7
