= Strymonites =

Strymonites or Strymonian Slavs (Greek: Στρυμονῖται / Strymonitai) were a tribe of Sclaveni (Early Slavs) who settled in the region of the river Strymon (Struma) in eastern parts of the historical region of Macedonia.

They took part in the Slavic siege of the Byzantine city of Thessalonica c. 677. As narrated in the Miracles of Saint Demetrius, they used their light ships to raid the coasts of the northern Aegean Sea, reportedly even into the Sea of Marmara. They may also possibly have assisted in the Arab sack of the city in 904.

== See also ==
- Strymon (theme)

== Literature ==
- Curta, Florin (2001). The Making of the Slavs: History and Archaeology of the Lower Danube Region, c. 500–700. Cambridge: Cambridge University Press. ISBN 9781139428880.
