= Drougoubitai =

The Drougoubitai, also Drogobitai or Dragobitai (Greek: Δρο[υ]γο[υ]βῖται/Δραγοβῖται), variously anglicized as Drugubites, Drogubites, Druguvites, Draguvites etc., were a South Slavic group (Sclaveni) who settled in the Balkans in the 7th century. Two distinct branches are mentioned in the sources, one living in medieval Macedonia to the north and east of Thessalonica and around Veroia (in modern Greece).

== Etymology ==
As in the historical sources the ethnonym is mentioned differently, some scholars consider that Droguvites in Macedonia and Draguvites in Thrace are two different tribes, but the difference is probably due to Greek mispronunciation of Slavic "ъ" (as "ο", "ου" or "α"). It is considered to derive from "*Drъgъvitji" (from Proto-Slavic word "*drъgъva", 'swamp'), and to be "undoubtedly" related to the East Slavic tribe of Dregoviches or originating from the same area of Pripyat Marshes.

== History ==
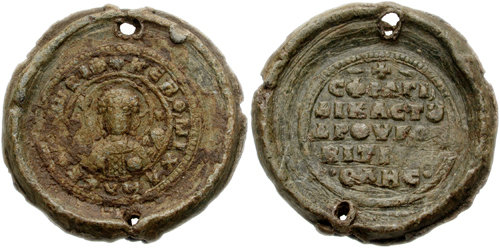
11th-century Byzantine seal of an anonymous "krites (civil governor) of the Drougoubitai"

The 7th-century Miracles of Saint Demetrius, which chronicle the Slavic invasions and settlement in the Balkans, list the first branch of the Drougoubitai along with four other Sclaveni tribes living in the vicinity of Thessalonica. According to the Miracles, they were led by kings, and were tributary allies to the Byzantines. The Miracles also record their participation in two unsuccessful attacks by Sclaveni coalitions on Thessalonica, in 617/618 and 677.

By 879, a bishopric of Drougoubiteia (Δρουγουβιτεία), suffragan to the Metropolis of Thessalonica, had been established. Nicolas Oikonomides has suggested that at about the same time, the tribe was placed under a Byzantine military governor with the title of strategos. In the late 10th and 11th centuries, Drougoubiteia is attested as being united with the themes of Thessalonica and Strymon into a single province. In the early 10th century, John Kaminiates speaks of the Drougoubitai as living around Veroia, while in the 13th century, Demetrios Chomatenos mentions them as "ruling" all the land from Veroia up to Skopje.

== See also ==
- List of Medieval Slavic tribes

== Sources ==
- Curta, Florin (2001). The Making of the Slavs: History and Archaeology of the Lower Danube Region, c. 500–700. Cambridge: Cambridge University Press. ISBN 9781139428880.
- Curta, Florin (2006). Southeastern Europe in the Middle Ages, 500–1250. Cambridge: Cambridge University Press. ISBN 978-0-521-81539-0.
- Kazhdan, Alexander, ed. (1991). The Oxford Dictionary of Byzantium. Oxford and New York: Oxford University Press. ISBN 0-19-504652-8.
- McGeer, Eric; Nesbitt, John; Oikonomides, Nicolas, eds. (2001). Catalogue of Byzantine Seals at Dumbarton Oaks and in the Fogg Museum of Art, Volume 4: The East. Washington, DC: Dumbarton Oaks Research Library and Collection. ISBN 0-88402-282-X.
- Oikonomides, Nicolas (1972). Les listes de préséance byzantines des IXe et Xe siècles (in French). Paris.
