= Chronicle of Monemvasia =

Greek medieval historical texts

The Chronicle of Monemvasia (Greek: Τὸ χρονικὸν τῆς Μονεμβασίας, rarely known as the Chronicle of the Peloponnesos coined by French Byzantinist Paul Lemerle) is a medieval text of which four versions, all written in medieval Greek, are extant. The author (or authors) of the account is currently unknown. The Chronicle, specifically the version from the Iberikon monastery, narrates the events that depict the Avaro-Slavic conquest and colonization of mainland Greece, covering a period from 587 to 805 AD. Despite its compelling narrative, the Chronicle is not an actual chronicle. The text represents a compilation of sources involving Avars and Slavs and focuses on the foundation of the metropolitan see of Patras. It is possible that the Chronicle was actually used in negotiations with the metropolitan of Corinth over the status of the metropolitan of Patras.

== Versions ==
The first manuscript of the Chronicle was published in 1749 by Joseph Pasinus (or Giuseppe Passini) and his colleagues, Rivautella and Berta, at the Royal Library of Turin. The text was reissued in 1884 by Spyridon P. Lambros along with two other versions, one belonging to the Iberikon monastery and the other belonging to the Koutloumousiou monastery in Mount Athos. Minor corrections were made to all three versions of the Chronicle by N. A. Bees who republished the texts in 1909. Three years later (1912), a fourth version was published by Lambros who discovered another text at the Collegio Greco in Rome.

== Order of the texts ==
There is currently no consensus among modern scholars regarding the chronological order of the four Chronicle manuscripts. Lambros argues that the text discovered at the Iberikon monastery is the earliest version. N. A. Bees, however, disagrees with Lambros and finds the Iberikon manuscript to be a later variant of the Turin and Koutloumousion versions. But despite the lack of consensus, recent studies show the Iberikon text to be a later version of the Chronicle through its use of the Byzantine dating system whereas the Koutloumousion and Turin texts use the older Alexandrian dating system.

== Authorship ==
The author (or authors) of the Chronicle of Monemvasia is unknown. One hypothesis by J. Koder states that Arethas of Caesarea was responsible for compiling the text. However, Koder's argument was rejected by I. Dujčev based on the Chronicle's allusion to Emperor Nikephoros II (r. 963–969), who lived after Arethas. What is ultimately known about the author(s) is his/their ignorance of Balkan geography outside of the Peloponnese, despite basing his/their depiction of Avar attacks on Procopius's description of attacks by the Huns.

== Dates of composition ==
Scholars are also divergent in their views regarding the exact composition dates of the four Chronicle manuscripts. Paul Lemerle argues that the original text was first written in 932 AD when it was used in the Scholion of Arethas. However, Spyridon Lambros believes that the Iberikon text was composed between 806 and 1083, whereas the Turin and Koutloumousion texts were written sometime during the end of the 13th century. N. A. Bees disputes Lambros’s assessment and believes the entire Chronicle was developed between 1340 and the 16th century. S. Kougeas dates the composition of the text to after the reign of Emperor Nikephoros II Phokas (r. 963–969) whereas Michael Whitby states that the Chronicle was first composed in the Peloponnese in circa 1000 AD. I. Dujčev dates the Chronicle to 963–1018 AD, and Florin Curta dates the writing of the text to either the late 10th century or the early 11th century.

== Narrative ==
According to the Iberikon manuscript of the Chronicle, the Avars/Slavs conquered Thessaly, Epirus, Attica, and the island of Euboea. As a result, many Greeks retreated to other areas: the inhabitants of Patras fled to Rhegium in Calabria, the Argives fled to the island of Orobe, the Corinthians fled to Aegina, and the Laconians fled to Sicily. The city of Monemvasia, specifically, was built at the time on the coast in an inaccessible region of the Peloponnese by groups that would later be known collectively as Tzakones. Due to the more rugged terrain of the eastern Peloponnese, the areas from Corinth to Cape Malea remained under Roman (Byzantine Greek) control. One of the governors of the Peloponnese, a native of Lesser Armenia, came into conflict with a number of Slavic tribes and successfully annihilated them. This unnamed member of the Skleroi family helped make way for the native Greeks to reclaim their lands. Upon hearing these events, Emperor Nikephoros I (r. 802–811) contributed towards revitalizing the cities, rebuilding the churches, and Christianizing the barbarians.

== Derivative works ==
Most of the narrative in the Chronicle is derived from works by Evagrius Scholasticus, Theophanes the Confessor, Menander Protector, and Theophylactus Simocatta. The author(s) of the Chronicle, however, used another source in order to write about the Avars and Slavs establishing their rule in the Peloponnese for 218 years. This unknown text may have been a forgery of ecclesiastical origin used by or on behalf of the Bishop of Patras. Despite the source being unknown, it was used in both the Scholium of Arethas and in a letter by Patriarch Nicholas III to Emperor Alexios I Komnenos (r. 1081–1118).

== Reliability ==
The historical validity of the Chronicle of Monemvasia is still a subject of academic dispute. Peter Charanis, for example, describes the Chronicle as "absolutely trustworthy". Kenneth Setton, however, disagrees with Charanis and argues that the Chronicle is a "medley of some fact and some fiction". Stilpon P. Kyriakides finds that the Chronicle contains an ecclesiastical bias and that the conquest of Greece by the Avars/Slavs is a myth. Ilias Anagnostakis and Anthony Kaldellis analyzed the text and found several misrepresentations and errors; Kaldellis has also called the Chronicle highly and notoriously unreliable.

=== Exaggerations and errors ===
There are a number of errors and exaggerations in the Chronicle of Monemvasia. For example, the city of Monemvasia was not built after the barbarians invaded Greece. In actuality, the city was constructed approximately four to five years (circa 582–583) before the advent of the Avars and Slavs. Another example entails the Corinthians' migration to the island of Aegina in the Saronic Gulf, which is contradicted by a correspondence (February 591 AD) between Pope Gregory the Great and Archbishop Anastasius of Corinth. Other sources that contradict the Chronicle include canons from the Sixth Ecumenical Synod (691–692) held in the Trullian Hall of the Great Palace of Constantinople, as well as the Taktika composed by Emperor Leo III the Isaurian (r. 717–741) between 733–746; both sources mention a continued presence of Greeks and church administrative institutions throughout mainland Greece with no indication of long-term Slavic demographic/political overlordship. As for the rebuilding of churches in the Peloponnese, there is no substantial architectural record that corroborates this particular event mentioned in the Chronicle.

From an archaeological viewpoint, the Chronicle of Monemvasia overstates the impact of the Avaro-Slavic invasions of Greece. In Methana, there is no evidence of any widespread disruption of settlement patterns (this is also the case elsewhere in the Peloponnese). The island of Kythera, on the other hand, was abandoned along with other coastal sites due to attacks conducted by one or more Slavic fleets.

== See also ==
- Miracles of Saint Demetrius, dealing with the Avaro-Slavic incursions in the Balkans and their attacks on Thessalonica

== Sources ==
- Anagnostakis, Ilias; Kaldellis, Anthony (2014). "The Textual Sources for the Peloponnese, A.D. 582–959: Their Creative Engagement with Ancient Literature". Greek, Roman, and Byzantine Studies. 54 (1): 105–135. ISSN 2159-3159.
- Charanis, Peter (1950). "The Chronicle of Monemvasia and the Question of the Slavonic Settlements in Greece". Dumbarton Oaks Papers. 5. Washington, District of Columbia: 139–166. doi:10.2307/1291076. JSTOR 1291076.
- Constantelos, Demetrios J. (1970). "Canon 62 of the Synod in Trullo and the Slavic Problem". Byzantina. 2: 23–35.
- Curta, Florin (2001). The Making of the Slavs: History and Archaeology of the Lower Danube Region, c. 500–700. Cambridge: Cambridge University Press. ISBN 9781139428880.
- Curta, Florin (2006). Southeastern Europe in the Middle Ages, 500–1250. Cambridge: Cambridge University Press. ISBN 978-0-521-81539-0.
- Geanakoplos, Deno John (1984). Byzantium: Church, Society, and Civilization Seen through Contemporary Eyes. Chicago, Illinois: University of Chicago Press. ISBN 9788473396905.
- Gregory, Timothy E. (2010). A History of Byzantium (Second ed.). West Sussex: John Wiley and Sons. ISBN 9781405184717.
- Haldon, John F. (1990). Byzantium in the Seventh Century: The Transformation of a Culture. Cambridge, United Kingdom: Cambridge University Press. ISBN 978-0-521-31917-1.
- Kaldellis, Anthony (2019). Romanland: Ethnicity and Empire in Byzantium. Harvard University Press. ISBN 978-0-674-98651-0.
- Martyn, John R. C. (2004). The Letters of Gregory the Great. Toronto, Canada: Pontifical Institute of Mediaeval Studies. ISBN 9780888442901.
- Mee, Christopher; Patrick, Michael Atherton; Forbes, Hamish Alexander (1997). A Rough and Rocky Place: The Landscape and Settlement History of the Methana Peninsula, Greece: Results of the Methana Survey Project, sponsored by the British School at Athens and the University of Liverpool. Liverpool, United Kingdom: Liverpool University Press. ISBN 9780853237419.
- Kazhdan, Alexander, ed. (1991). The Oxford Dictionary of Byzantium. Oxford and New York: Oxford University Press. ISBN 0-19-504652-8.
- Kyriakides, Stilpon P. (1947). ΒΥΖΑΝΤΙΝΑΙ ΜΕΛΕΤΑΙ VI: ΟΙ ΣΛΑΒΟΙ ΕΝ ΠΕΛΟΠΟΝΝΗΣΩ [Byzantine Studies VI: The Slavs in the Peloponnese]. Thessaloniki, Greece: Etaireia Makedonikon Spoudon.
- Ruggieri, Vincenzo (1991). Byzantine Religious Architecture (582–867): Its History and Structural Elements. Pontificium Institutum Studiorum Orientalium. ISBN 88-7210-284-7.
- Setton, Kenneth M. (October 1950). "The Bulgars in the Balkans and the Occupation of Corinth in the Seventh Century". Speculum. 25 (4): 502–543.
- Whitby, Michael (1988). The Emperor Maurice and his Historian: Theophylact Simocatta on Persian and Balkan Warfare. Oxford, United Kingdom: Oxford University Press. ISBN 0-19-822945-3.
