= Slav (disambiguation) =

A Slav is a person of Slavic ethnicity.

Slav or Slavs may also refer to:

- Slav Defense, a chess opening
- Slav (village), a former Israeli settlement in the Gaza Strip
- Slav grebe, birdwatcher's jargon for horned grebe, a waterbird
- SLĀV, a controversial 2018 Canadian theatrical production
- Slavs!, and 1994 play by Tony Kushner

== See also ==
- Slavic (disambiguation)
