= Chatzon =

Slavic chieftain

Chatzon (Greek: Χάτζων) or, in some modern Slavic studies, Hacon (Хацон), was a Slavic chieftain (έξαρχος Σκλαβίνων 'exarch of the Sclaveni' in the Greek sources) who, according to Book II of the Miracles of Saint Demetrius, led a coalition of Slavic tribes to attack the Byzantine city of Thessalonica in 615.

The Slavs with their families encamped in front of the city walls and even launched an attack by sea, but the latter failed due to a storm (attributed by the Byzantines to the intervention of Saint Demetrius, Thessalonica's patron saint) which sunk many of the Slavs' logboats, after which the siege was lifted. Chatzon himself was allowed to enter the city during negotiations shortly after; however, the urban mob rioted at the instigation of the mothers of those slain during the siege and killed him, despite the city leaders' attempts to hide him. After this, the Slavs asked for the help of the Avars, resulting in the unsuccessful month-long siege of the city by the combined Avar and Slavic forces in 617/618.
