= Sagudates =

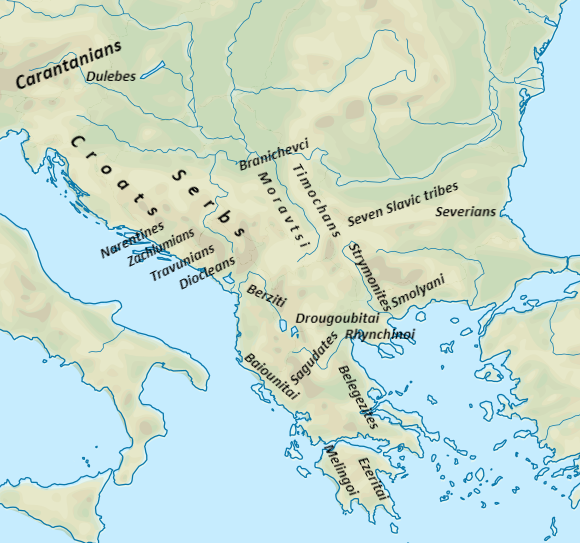
Approximate location of South Slavic tribes in the Early Middle Ages including Sagudates

The Sagudates (Greek: Σαγουδάται, Sagoudatai) were a South Slavic tribe that lived in the region of Macedonia, in the area between Thessaloniki and Veria.

== History ==
The Sagudates were first attested in a Byzantine document dated 686 as allies of the Avars and besiegers of Thessalonica in an alliance with two other South Slavic tribes, the Rynchines and the Drugubites. In the 7th century, the Sagudates, along with other tribes, used logboats to plunder the coasts of Thessaly. In the 9th century, the Sagudates started living in mixed villages with the Drugubites and paid taxes to the Byzantine authorities of Thessalonica.
