= Berziti =

South Slavic tribe

The Berziti (Bulgarian, Macedonian and Serbian: Берзити; Greek: Βερζῆτες, romanized: Berzites) were a South Slavic tribe that settled in Byzantine Macedonia in late 6th century AD with the Slavic invasion of the Balkans. The Berziti settled in the vicinity of Lychnidos (Ohrid). One part of the same tribe settled in Brest, Belarus, while another, moved south into the Balkans.

== See also ==
- List of Medieval Slavic tribes
- Brsjaks
