= Miracles of Saint Demetrius =

Collection of homilies; historical record of the Balkans (7th century)

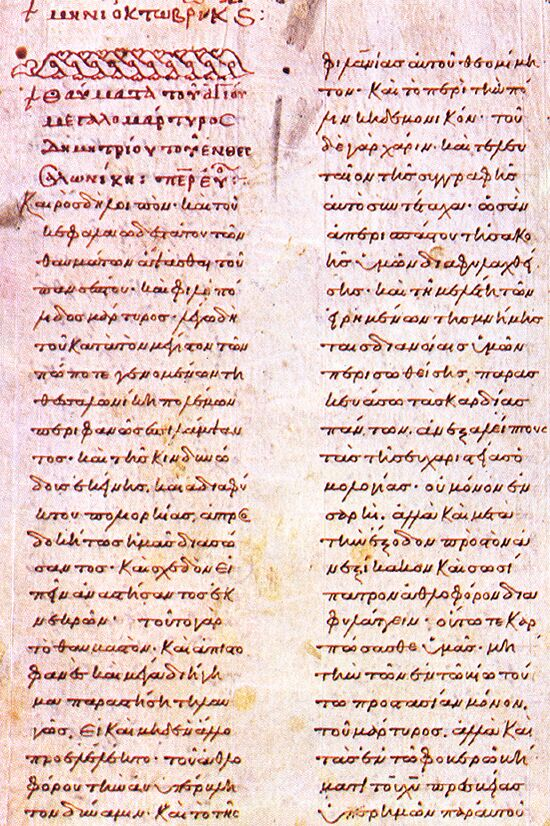
Folio of the Miracles, from the Vaticanus graecus 797 manuscript

The Miracles of Saint Demetrius (Latin: Miracula Sancti Demetrii) is a 7th-century collection of homilies, written in Greek, accounting the miracles performed by the patron saint of Thessalonica, Saint Demetrius. It is a unique work for the history of the city and the Balkans in general, especially in relation to the Slavic invasions of the late 6th and 7th centuries, which are otherwise neglected by contemporary sources.

== Date and content ==
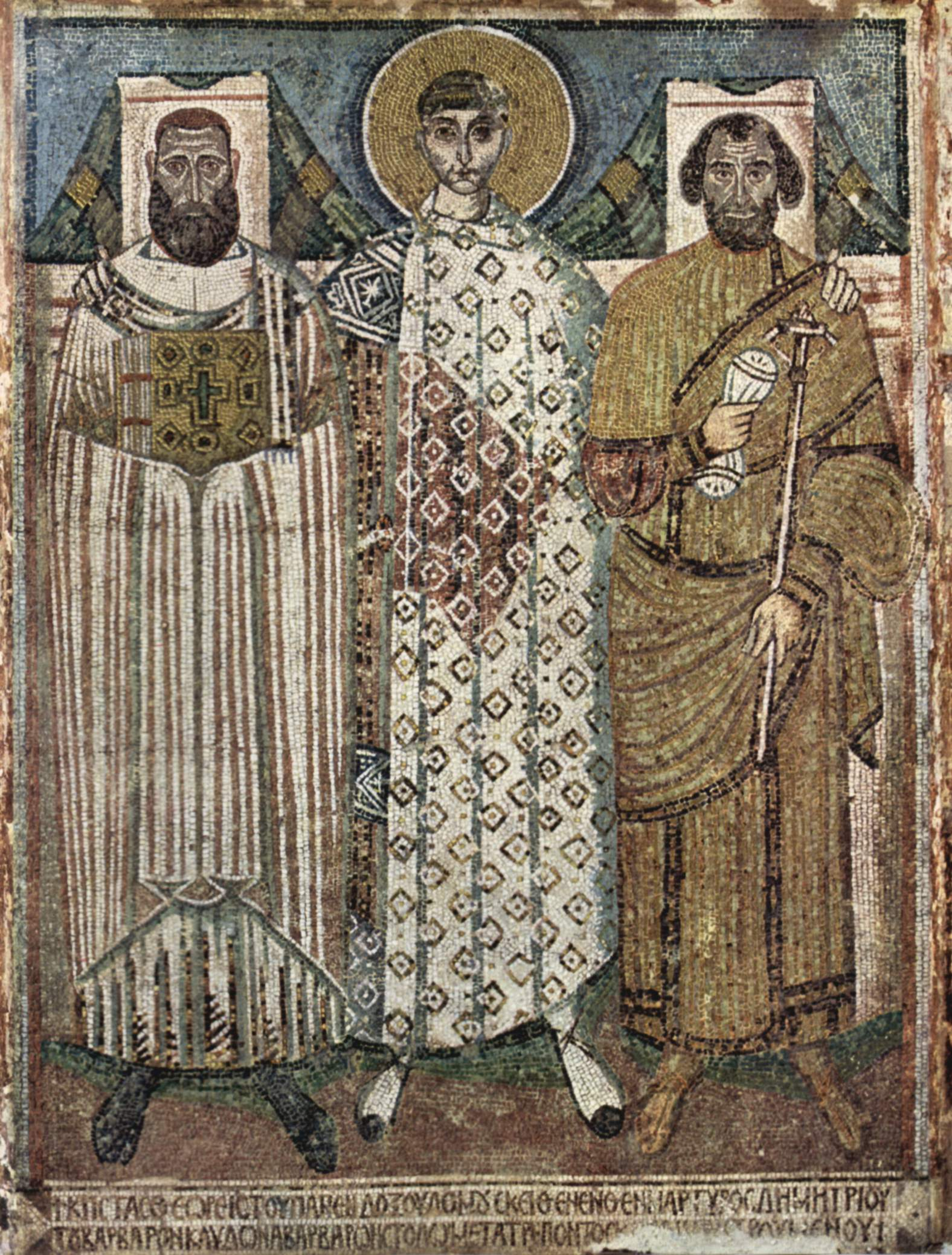
7th-century mosaic from the cathedral of St. Demetrius in Thessalonica, depicting the saint with the bishop (left), often identified with John, and the governor (right) of the city

The Miracles comprise two books. The first was compiled between c. 610 and c. 620 by John, Archbishop of Thessalonica, and the second was compiled in the 680s. The first book enumerates fifteen episodes of Saint Demetrius's intervention on behalf of Thessalonica, most of which occurred in the episcopate of John's predecessor, Eusebius, including outbreaks of plague and the siege of the city by the Sclaveni (proto-South Slavs) and Avars. These episodes were written in the form of homilies or sermons, to be publicly read to the city's populace in order to demonstrate the Saint's active presence and intercession on their behalf.

The second book differs considerably in style, and is closer to an actual historical account, with the unknown author being an eyewitness or using written annals or eyewitness testimonies for the events he is describing, i.e. the Slavic invasion and settlement of the Balkans, including a series of sieges of Thessalonica by the Slavs and the Avars, culminating in the great Slavic attack of c. 677. Whereas in Book I John portrays the Slavs as generic barbarians, the unknown author of Book II is far more familiar with them and their tribal divisions, listing the several Slavic tribes that settled around the city and calling them "our neighbours". Due to its change in style and focus, the second book proved less popular than the first with copyists in the following centuries, and survives in only a single manuscript.

The Miracles are particularly valuable as a historical source. As the eminent scholar of the medieval Balkans, Dimitri Obolensky, writes, "in no other contemporary work will he find so much precise and first-hand information on the military organization and topography of Thessalonica during one of the most dramatic centuries of its history; on the methods of warfare and the techniques of siege-craft used in the Balkan wars of the time; and on the strategy and tactics of the northern barbarians who, thrusting southward in successive waves down river valleys and across mountain passes, sought in the sixth and seventh centuries to gain a foothold on the warm Aegean coastland and to seize its commanding metropolis which always eluded their grasp. And there can be few documents stemming from the Christian world of the Middle Ages in which the belief held by the citizens of a beleaguered city that they stand under the supernatural protection of a heavenly patron is so vividly and poignantly expressed."

The second book also preserves information on the second basilica dedicated to Saint Demetrius, before its destruction by fire in 629/634. A few of the surviving portions of the church, especially the mosaics, were re-used when the church was rebuilt. One of the mosaics is believed by some scholars to be depicting the Archbishop John, the author of Book I of the Miracles.

== Editions ==
The main critical edition is Paul Lemerle's two-volume (text and commentary) Les plus anciens recueils des miracles de saint Démétrius et la pénétration des Slaves dans les Balkans, Éditions du Centre National de la Recherche Scientifique, Paris 1979–1981. 268 pages.

== Modern literature ==
American writer Harry Turtledove, who had studied Byzantine history, published in 1997 the fantasy novel Thessalonica, inspired by the Miracles of Saint Demetrius. The novel is based on the assumption that the miracles described did actually happen and that Saint Demetrius, as well as numerous other beings of the Christian as well as Classical Greek and Slavic mythologies, appeared and took part in the siege of Thessalonica.

== See also ==
- Chronicle of Monemvasia, dealing with the Avaro-Slavic incursions into Greece and their subsequent settlement there

== Sources ==
- Curta, Florin (2001). The Making of the Slavs: History and Archaeology of the Lower Danube Region, c. 500–700. Cambridge: Cambridge University Press. ISBN 9781139428880.
- Obolensky, Dimitri (1994). Byzantium and the Slavs. St. Vladimir's Seminary Press. ISBN 0-88141-008-X.
