= Florin Curta =

American-Romanian historian

- Born: January 15, 1965 (age 61); Romania
- Occupations: Archaeologist, historian

Academic background
- Education: University of Bucharest; Cornell University; Western Michigan University
- Thesis: Making an Early Medieval Ethnie: The Case of the Early Slavs (Sixth to Seventh Century A.D.) (1998)

Academic work
- Notable works: The Making of the Slavs: History and Archaeology of the Lower Danube Region (2001)

Notes
- Honorary Member of the Romanian Academy (2023)

Florin Curta (born January 15, 1965) is a Romanian-born American archaeologist and historian who is a professor of medieval history and archaeology at the University of Florida. Curta is known for an unorthodox approach and interpretation of the ethnogenesis of the Early Slavs, a hypothesis published first in The Making of the Slavs: History and Archaeology of the Lower Danube Region (2001), and met with negative criticism.

== Biography ==
Curta works in the field of Balkans history and is a professor of medieval history and archaeology at the University of Florida in Gainesville, Florida. Curta's first book, The Making of the Slavs: History and Archaeology of the Lower Danube Region, was named a 2002 Choice Outstanding Academic Title and won the Herbert Baxter Adams Award of the American Historical Association in 2003. Curta is the editor-in-chief of the Brill series East Central and Eastern Europe in the Middle Ages, 450–1450. In 2011, he contributed to The Edinburgh History of the Greeks. He is a member of the Institute for Advanced Study, School of Historical Studies, Princeton University (Spring 2007) and was a visiting fellow at Corpus Christi College, Oxford University (2015). He attends an Eastern Orthodox Christian parish.

== Theories ==
Being inspired by Reinhard Wenskus and the Vienna School of History, Curta's work since The Making of the Slavs: History and Archaeology of the Lower Danube Region (2001) is known for his usage of post-processual and post-structuralist approach in explaining Slavic ethnogenesis and migrations (especially regarding Slavic migrations to the Balkans), arguing against the mainstream view and primordial culture-historical approach in archaeology and historiography. Curta advances an alternative, "revisionist" hypothesis which considers the Slavs as an "ethno-political category" invented by the Byzantines, which was formed by political instrumentation and interaction on the Roman Danubian frontier where barbarian elite culture flourished. He considers that the Slavic language was not an ethnolect, but a koiné language and lingua franca which formed by interaction of different languages and cultures and did not spread with the migration of a distinctive ethnic group of speakers. As such, the identity of Slavs was formed and spread by communities speaking the koiné language through language shift. According to Curta, questions of identity and ethnicity are modern social constructs, imposed externally. Curta therefore argues against theories of Slavic mass expansion from the Slavic Urheimat and denies the existence of the Slavic Urheimat. His work rejects ideas of Slavic languages as the unifying element of the Slavs or the adducing of Prague-type ceramics as an archaeological cultural expression of the Early Slavs. Curta's hypothesis is opposed to both allochthonic (majority) and autochthonic (minority) concepts of Slavic ethnogenesis.

Archaeogenetic research confirmed a common genetic heritage of the Slavs, a putative existence and location of their Urheimat, a large movement of people, connection with the Slavic archaeological cultures and spread of the Slavic languages in Europe, but Curta dismisses them, saying in 2024 there's "no class of evidence attests to the existence of any migration across the territory of Romania. Migration is certainly not the mechanism responsible for the spread of Slavic [language]", and 2025 that "were there migrations? Sure, there were plenty [...] but how do you identify one in particular as Slavic? It's an arbitrary choice".

=== Criticism ===
Curta's hypotheses were met with substantial disagreement and "severe criticism in general and in detail" by other archaeologists, historians, linguists and ethnologists, who "unanimously agree on the highly debatable nature of Florin Curta's concept". The scholarship in East Central, Southeastern and Eastern Europe in particular mostly ignored or rejected Curta's hypothesis. It was ignored by most of Polish allochthonists, and negated by some neo-autochthonists.

Scientists criticized what they saw as Curta's "arbitrary" and "relativistic" selection of historical and archaeological data (using only 1/3 of latter available data), sites, and his interpretation of chronologies to support his preconceived conclusions. In addition, they felt his "interpretative" cultural model inadequately explained the emergence and spread of the Slavs, Slavic culture and language. Alan Timberlake suggests "that Curta's meticulous quantitative argument shows the opposite: it demonstrates that there is significant similarity of Slavic pottery at different times and in different locales, so that there really is similarity and continuity of [Slavic] tradition". Michel Kazanski stated that the "archaeologists researching Slavic antiquities do not accept the ideas produced by the 'diffusionists,' because most of the champions of the diffusion model know the specific archaeological materials poorly, so their works leave room for a number of arbitrary interpretations".

Curta's claim that the Common Slavic is "an artificial, scholarly construct not attested by any piece of hard evidence" (2015) was criticized by Jouko Lindstedt that "only shows his ignorance of the historical-comparative method. The existence of a protolanguage that is only about 1,500 years old and has more than a dozen closely-related daughters, several of them with early written sources, is attested by very hard evidence indeed". Lindstedt also noted, as other linguists have already asserted, the Late Proto-Slavic/Common Slavic complex morphological and accentological system "shows no trace of a possible lingua-franca function".

Some also criticized what they saw as Curta's lack of critical evaluation of his own theorization and analysis while refuting old ideas in literature. Others criticized his "very cursory and selective analysis of sources concerning the history of Byzantium", inadequate argumentation and contradicting information given by ancient Byzantine historiographers such as Theophylact Simocatta, or arbitrary evaluation and citation of Jordanes. Curta's viewpoint was considered similar to the Romanian historiography's minimization of the role of Slavs in the history of Romania. In a separate case, Hungarian historian Istvan Vasary, in his response to Curta's review of his book, stated that Curta was defensive of Romanian national historiography and Daco-Romanian continuity, claims which Curta denied.

The renewed version of the hypothesis published as Slavs in the Making: History, Linguistics, and Archaeology in Eastern Europe (ca. 500-ca. 700) (2020) was criticized to "still does not appear more convincing". Although Curta's work found partial support by those who use a similar approach, like Walter Pohl and Danijel Džino, and sparked new scientific debate (with some importance for archaeology), the migrationist model remains in the view of many as the most acceptable and possible to explain the spread of the Slavs as well as Slavic culture (including language).

== Bibliography ==
- Curta, Florin (1997). "Slavs in Fredegar and Paul the Deacon: Medieval gens or scourge of God?" (PDF). Early Medieval Europe. 6 (2): 141–167. Archived from the original on July 20, 2025.
- Curta, Florin (1998). Making an Early Medieval Ethnie: The Case of the Early Slavs (Sixth to Seventh Century A.D.) (Doctor of Philosophy thesis). Kalamazoo, Michigan: Western Michigan University.
- Curta, Florin (1999). "Hiding Behind a Piece of Tapestry: Jordanes and the Slavic Venethi". Jahrbücher für Geschichte Osteuropas. 47 (3): 321–340.
- Curta, Florin (2001). The Making of the Slavs: History and Archaeology of the Lower Danube Region, c. 500–700. Cambridge: Cambridge University Press. doi:10.1017/CBO9780511496295. ISBN 9780521802024.
- Curta, Florin (2001). "Limes and Cross: The Religious Dimension of the Sixth-century Danube Frontier of the Early Byzantine Empire". Старинар. 51: 45–70.
- Curta, Florin (2006). Southeastern Europe in the Middle Ages, 500–1250. Cambridge: Cambridge University Press. ISBN 978-0-521-81539-0.
- Curta, Florin (2011). The Edinburgh History of the Greeks, c. 500 to 1050: The Early Middle Ages. Edinburgh: Edinburgh University Press. doi:10.1515/9780748644896. ISBN 9780748644896. JSTOR j.ctt1r23dk. S2CID 163031847.
- Curta, Florin (2019). Eastern Europe in the Middle Ages (500–1300). Brill's Companions to European History, vol. 19. Leiden and Boston: Brill. ISBN 9789004395190.
- Curta, Florin (2020). Slavs in the Making: History, Linguistics, and Archaeology in Eastern Europe (ca. 500-ca. 700). London: Routledge. doi:10.4324/9780203701256. ISBN 9780203701256. S2CID 225265576.
- Curta, Florin (2021). The Long Sixth Century in Eastern Europe. Brill. ISBN 9789004456983.
- Curta, Florin; Stamati, Iurie (2021). Women Archaeologists under Communism, 1917-1989: Breaking the Glass Ceiling. Springer Nature. ISBN 9783030875206.
- Curta, Florin; Paliga, Sorin (2023). Slavii în perioada migraţiilor (in Romanian). Cetatea de Scaun. ISBN 9786065375840.

=== Edited volumes ===
- East Central & Eastern Europe in the Early Middle Ages. Ann Arbor: University of Michigan Press, 2005.
- Borders, Barriers, and Ethnogenesis. Frontiers in Late Antiquity and the Middle Ages. Turnhout, Belgium: Brepols, 2005.
- The other Europe in the Middle Ages. Avars, Bulgars, Khazars, and Cumans. Leiden-Boston: Brill, 2008.
- Neglected Barbarians. Turnhout: Brepols, 2011.
- with Bogdan-Petru Maleon, The Steppe Lands and the World Beyond Them. Studies in Honor of Victor Spinei on his 70th Birthday. Iași: Editura Universității "Alexandru Ioan Cuza", 2013.
