= Slavic migrations to the Balkans =

Overview of Slavic migrations to Southeast Europe

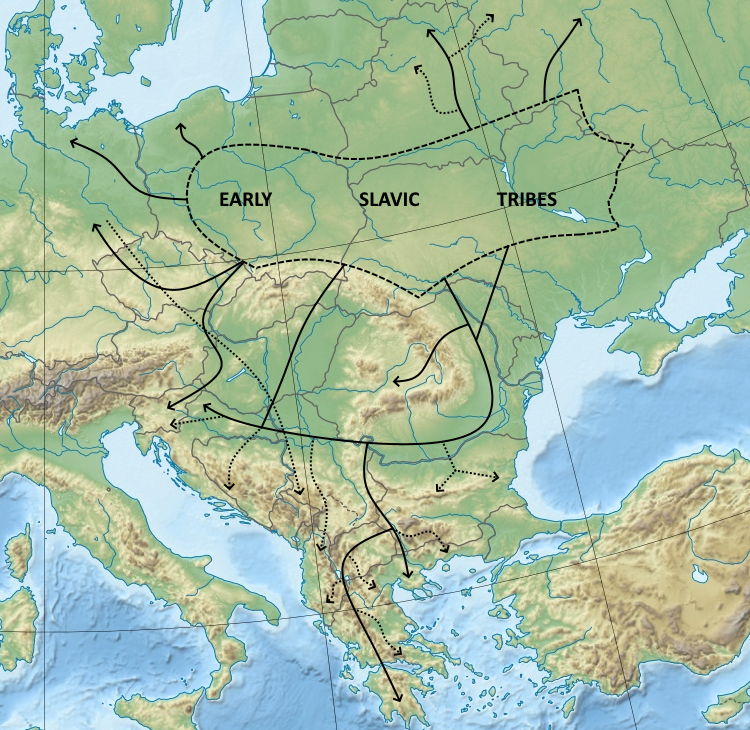
Slavic homeland and migrations in the 6th and 7th century (per Dvornik 1956; Váňa 1983; Sedov 1994, 1995; Barford 2001).

Early Slavs began mass migrating to Southeastern Europe between the first half of the 6th and 7th century in the Early Middle Ages. The rapid demographic spread of the Slavs was followed by a population exchange, mixing and language shift to and from Slavic.

The settlement was facilitated by the substantial decrease of the Southeastern European population during the Plague of Justinian. Another reason was the Late Antique Little Ice Age from 536 to around 660 CE and the series of wars between the Sasanian Empire and the steppe nomads against the Eastern Roman Empire. After the arrival of the Pannonian Avars in the mid-6th century, they continued to conduct incursions into Roman territory, often independently of Avar's influence. After the failed siege of Constantinople in the summer of 626, and successful revolt against the Avars, they remained in the wider Southeast Europe area after they had settled the Byzantine provinces south of the Sava and Danube rivers, from the Adriatic Sea to the Aegean and Black Sea.

Exhausted by several factors and reduced to the coastal parts of the Balkans, Byzantium was not able to wage war on two fronts and regain its lost territories, so it reconciled with the establishment of Sklavinias and created an alliance with them against the Avar and Bulgar Khaganates.

== Background ==
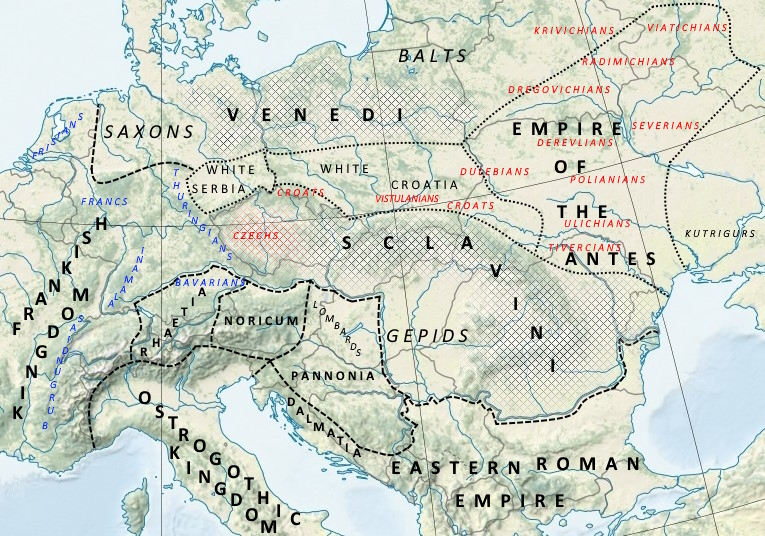
Historical situation in cca. 560 AD before the invasion of the Pannonian Avars, according to Francis Dvornik (1949–56).

Before the great migration period, the population of the Southeast Europe was composed of Ancient Greeks, Illyrians and Thracians who had been Romanized and Hellenized, as well as of Roman Imperial subjects. Communities of Bastarnae, Sciri, Heruli, Gepids and Lombards were also present by the mid-6th century. After the destructive campaigns of Attila the Hun and the Goths, who were previously foederati, which resulted in the fall of the Western Roman Empire (c. 476 CE), Eastern Roman Emperor Justinian I began the reconstruction of fortresses, cities, and churches. However, the Plague of Justinian (from 541–549 until the mid-8th century) decimated the native population, resulting in the weakening of the Pannonian and Danubian Limes. Various factors, including the Late Antique Little Ice Age and population pressure, pushed the migration of the Early Slavs, some of whom since the mid-6th century were also led by the Pannonian Avars (while others led the conquest against the Avars). The adoption of other medieval European cultural customs, especially related to agriculture, also caused population growth among the Slavs.

Early Slavs could have been sporadically present in the Carpathian Basin during the time of Sarmatian Iazyges (and related to Limigantes). They possibly participated in the campaigns of the Huns and of various Germanic tribes from the end of the 5th century, although there's no record in historical sources, the evidence being recorded words "medos, kamos, strava" in a Hunnic camp.

== History ==
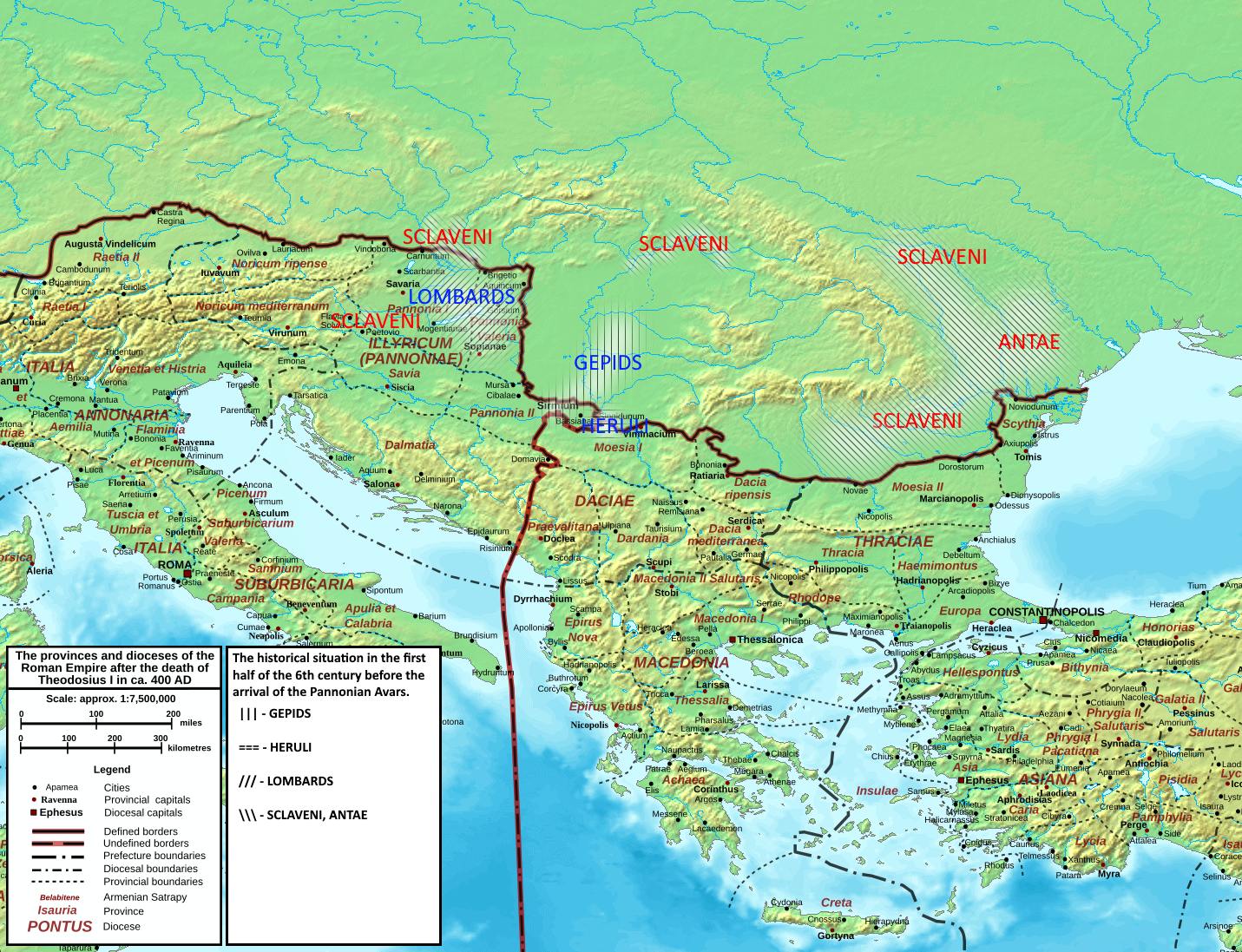
Historical situation in cca. 560 CE before the invasion of the Pannonian Avars, showing the location of Sclaveni, Antae, Gepids, Lombards and Heruli (per Pavlovič 2017; Filipec 2020).

The Slavs who settled in Southeast Europe comprised two groups: the Antae and the Sclaveni. The first certain Slavic raids date to the early 6th century during the time of the Eastern Roman Emperor Justin I (r. 518–527), coinciding with the end of the Vitalian revolt of 511–518. Procopius recorded that in 518 a large army of the Antae, "who dwell close to the Sclaveni", crossed the Danube River into Roman territory, but suffered a bad defeat by magister militum per Thraciam Germanus. In 536, some 1,600 horsemen of Slavs, Huns and Antae arrived in Italy as Byzantine reinforcement to rescue Belisarius, serving also as horsearchers. Raids continued with ever-faster and stronger incursions during the time of Justinian I (r. 527–565), with Procopius recording that the whole of Illyricum and Thrace (killing its magister militum Chilbudius) was pillaged almost every year by Huns, (Note: The ethnonym of the Huns, like those of Scythians and Türks, became a generic term for steppe-people (nomads) and invading enemies from the East, no matter their actual origin and identity.) Sclaveni, and Antae, who with each incursion did enormous damage to the native Roman population, making the region a "Scythian desert". Jordanes considered the devastation wrought by Slavs to be a divine punishment for the Roman sins. They also possibly participated in the devastating 539/540 winter raid of the Huns which covered lands from the Adriatic coast to the Constantinople. Between 535 and 540, the Sclaveni accepted the exiled Lombard prince Hildigis, son of Risiulfus, who was fleeing the conflict between Audoin and Thurisind, and helped him organise his own army of 6,000 Gepids, Lombards and Sclaveni, which temporarily supported Thurisind's case, and plundered Roman Thrace, but the exact location of the Slavs in question remains a matter of scholarly debate (but most probably in the Carpathian Basin near the Danubian frontier).

For a great throng of the barbarians, Sclaveni, had, as it happened, recently crossed the river Ister, plundered the adjoining country and enslaved a very great number of Romans ... Huns and Antae and Sclaveni had already made the crossing many times and done irreparable harm to the Romans ... At about this time [548] an army of Sclaveni crossed the river Ister [Danube] and spread desolation throughout the whole of Illyricum as far as Epidamnus, killing or enslaving all who came in their way, young and old alike and plundering their property. And they had already succeeded in capturing numerous strongholds of that region, which were then quite undefended, but which previously had been reputed to be strong places, and they continued to roam about searching out everything at their own pleasure. And the commanders of the Illyrians kept following them with an army of 15,000 men, without, however, having the courage to get close to the enemy.

At about this time [549] an army of Sclaveni amounting to not more than 3,000 crossed the Ister River without encountering any opposition, advanced immediately to the Hebrus River, which they crossed with no difficulty, and then split into two parts. Now the one section of them contained 1,800 men, while the other comprised the remainder. And although the two sections were thus separated from each other, the commanders of the Roman army, upon engaging with them, both in Illyricum and in Thrace, were defeated unexpectedly, and some of them were killed on the field of battle, while others saved themselves by a disorderly flight. Now after all the generals had fared thus at the hands of the two barbarian armies, though they were far inferior to the Roman forces in number, one section of the enemy engaged with Asbadus. This man was a guard of the Emperor Justinian, since he served among the candidati as they are called, and he was also commander of the cavalry cohorts which from ancient times have been stationed at Tzurullum, the fortress in Thrace, a numerous body of the best troops. These too the Sclaveni routed with no trouble, and they slew the most of them in a most disgraceful flight ... Having accomplished these things, they turned to plunder all the towns, both of Thrace and of Illyricum, in comparative security; and both armies captured many fortresses by siege ... Then those who had defeated Asbadus plundered everything in order as far as the sea and captured by storm a city on the coast named Topirus ... Then they slew all the men immediately, to the number of 15,000, took all the valuables as plunder, and reduced the children and women to slavery. Before this, however, they had spared no age, but both these aud the other group, since the time when they fell upon the land of the Romans, had been killing all who fell in their way, young and old alike, so that the whole land inhabited by the Illyrians and Thracians came to be everywhere filled with unburied corpses ... Thus did the Sclaveni consistently destroy those who fell in their way. But from this time onward both these and those of the other group, being as it were drunk with the great quantity of blood they had shed, saw fit to make prisoners of some who fell into their hands, and consequently they were taking with them countless thousands of prisoners when they all departed on the homeward way.

At one point in the late 530s or early 540s, the Sclaveni and Antae "became hostile to one another and engaged in a battle, in which it so fell out that the Antae were defeated by their opponents". In 545 Justinian I managed to make an alliance with the Antae to stop Hunnic intrusions into the Lower Danube area, but this caused more Sclaveni intrusions from the Middle Danube region. In 550, Hildigis commanding a contingent of seven thousand Slavs, Lombards, and Gepids attacked and plundered Moesia, where he defeated Byzantine imperial soldiers and advanced as far as Constantinople. According to Procopius, around the summer of the same year, a massive number of Sclaveni "such as never before was known arrived on Roman soil, having crossed the Ister River and come to the vicinity of Naissus", planning to capture by siege Thessalonica and near cities. Hearing that Germanus was organizing large forces in Serdica southeast of Naissus (initially with plans for a campaign against Totila's Goths in Italy, but now devoted to repel Sclaveni's invasion; meanwhile Narses had to deal with Kutrigurs around Philippopolis), the Sclaveni abandoned their initial plans and crossed the Dinaric Alps mountain ranges of Illyricum and came into the province of Dalmatia. Germanus soon died, and the army now led by his son-in-law John (nephew of Vitalian) and son Justinian was ordered to start marching to Dalmatia, pass the winter in Salona and then move from there to Ravenna. By the time they entered the province of Dalmatia, the first group of Sclaveni was joined by a second group who also crossed the Danube, and "overrun the Roman domain with complete freedom ... divide themselves into three groups and wrought irreparable damage ... not merely plundering that country by sudden raids, but actually spending the winter as if in their own land and having no fear of the enemy", disabling Roman armies movement to Ravenna but not engaging in battle. Procopius reported that some thought that the Sclaveni were invited with large sums of money by Totila to divert emperor's forces from attacking the Goths in Italy by land.

Eventually, emperor Justinian decided to assemble a large army led by the commanders John, Narses, Constantianus, Aratius, Justin (eldest son of Germanus), and supreme commander Scholasticus (imperial eunuch). They clashed in spring 551 with one of the three groups of Slavs near Adrianopolis in Thrace, where "Romans were decisively vanquished. In that battle many of the best soldiers perished, and the generals came within a little of falling into the hands of the enemy, succeeding only with difficulty in making their escape with the remnant of the army and thus saving themselves, each as best he could", the Sclaveni captured the standard of Constantianus, went on to plunder Astica and reached the Anastasian Wall, where Roman forces managed a victory over a part of the barbarian forces, retrieving the standard and rescued many Roman captives, but nevertheless the Sclaveni departed with large looting. In the same year or early 552, another throng of Sclaveni and 12,000 Kutrigurs attacked Illyricum "and inflicted sufferings there not easily described", helped twice by the Gepids to cross the Danube (as Gepids controlled the river passages of the Middle Danube, Sava and Drava, including territory around Sirmium, and in doing so enabled a route avoiding defensive forts on the limes and enter Upper Moesia, Illyricum, Thrace up to Constantinople):

And the Emperor Justinian sent an army against them commanded by the sons of Germanus with others. But since this army was far outnumbered by the enemy, it was quite unable to engage with them, but remained always in the rear and cut down the stragglers left by the barbarians. And they slew many of them but took some few prisoners, whom they sent to the emperor. But nevertheless these barbarians continued their work of devastation. And spending as they did a long time in this plundering expedition, they filled all the roads with corpses, and enslaved countless multitudes and pillaged everything without meeting any opposition; then finally they departed on the homeward journey with all their plunder. Nor could the Romans ambuscade them while crossing the Ister River or harm them in any other way, since the Gepaedes, having engaged their services, took them under their protection and ferried them across, receiving large payment for their labour. For the payment was at the rate of one gold stater per head. At this the emperor was grievously vexed, seeing that for the future he had no possible means of checking the barbarians when crossing the Ister River in order to plunder the Roman domain, or when taking their departure from such expeditions with the booty they gained, and he wished for these reasons to enter into some sort of treaty with the nation of the Gepaedes ... But not long after this, when the Lombards according to the terms of their alliance requested an army to fight with them against the Gepaedes, the Emperor Justinian sent it, laying the charge against the Gepaedes that after the treaty they had transported certain of the Sclaveni across the Ister River to the detriment of the Romans.

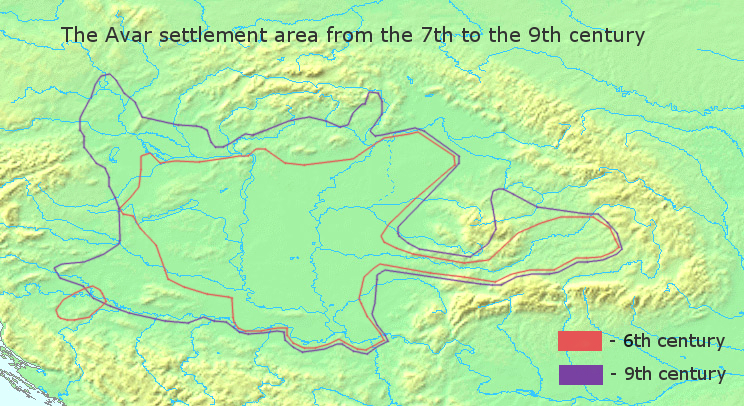
Settlement area of Pannonian Avars elite in the 6th and 9th area. The Avar Khaganate, which formed on the territory previously occupied by Gepids, Lombards and Sclaveni, was a multi-ethnic society.

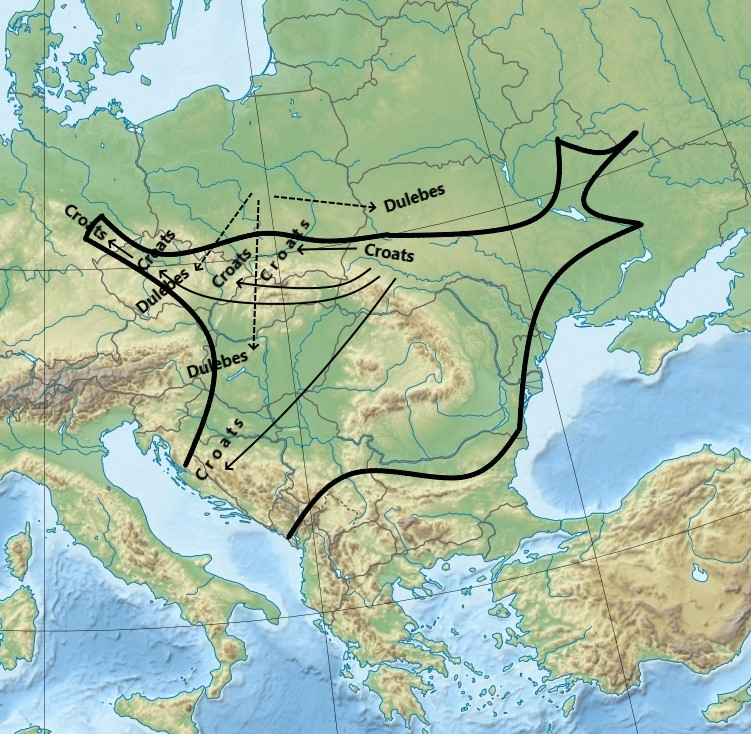
Presumed location and migration routes of the tribes of Dulebes and White Croats, per V. V. Sedov (1979).

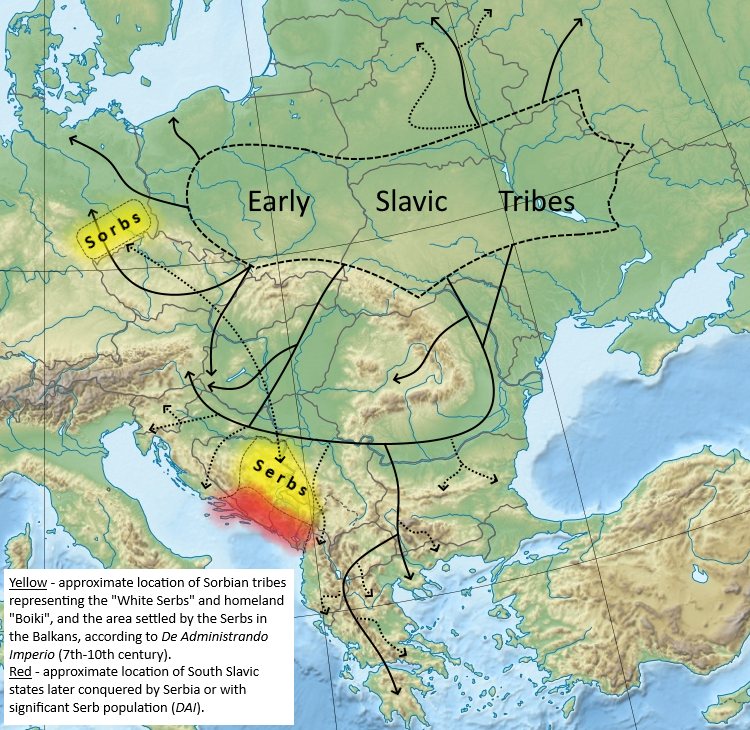
Migration route of the Serbs in the 7th century.

In response to the Sclaveni and Kutrigur intrusion, Justinian paid the Utrigurs to attack the Kutrigurs' homeland, which temporarily resolved the situation.As a response against the Slavic intrusions, the Byzantines supported the Lombards against the Gepids, which led to the defeat of the Gepids at the Battle of Asfeld, which compelled the Gepids to return to their previous alliance with the empire and to stop ferrying raiders. Additionally, Justinian I succeeded in realizing an extensive building program of more than 600 forts across three defensive lines in the Balkans, because of which there were no recorded independent raids of the Sclaveni between 552 and 577. In 558/559 some Sclaveni joined the Kutrigurs led by Zabergan in their devastating invasion of the Balkans, (though Belisarius was able to defeat and repel their invasion), and in 568 the Kutrigurs raided Dalmatia as well. Historical circumstances substantially changed with the arrival of the Pannonian Avars (after the complete fall of the Gepids (567) and the departure of Lombards in 568), who fought against the Antae and subjugated masses of both Antae (562, but maintained independence as Byzantine allies until 602) and the Sclaveni (Pannonian-Middle Danubian Slavs lost their independence to the Avars between 571 and 578, while Lower Danube/Wallachian Slavs were active on their own although as Avar allies since 585). It is considered unlikely that the Avars ruled over all the Slavs in the Danube region at one time, and "whether autonomously or under commission from the Avars", they continued to make incursions into the Roman territory.

After the death of Justinian I, the new Roman Emperor Justin II (r. 565–574) halted the payment of subsidies to the Avars, thus sparking an almost century-long war (568–626). With the Byzantines preoccupied with the 572–591 and 602–628 wars with the Sasanian Empire, Avars and Slavs continued devastating intrusions along the Byzantine borders from Northern Italy to Southern Greece, and by the mid-7th century, the Slavs had settled in all the Balkans and Peloponnese. Menander Protector recorded that in fourth year of joint rule of emperors Justin II and Tiberius II Constantine (578), some 100,000 Lower Danube/Wallachian Sclaveni ravaged the province of Thrace and many other areas. John of Biclaro mentions that the Sclaveni plundering was even near the walls of Constantinople. Tiberius managed to make a short-term alliance with Avar khagan Bayan I, whose envoy to Slavic chief Daurentius was refused and murdered, and some 60,000 Avar horsemen aided by Byzantine quaestura exercitus and magister militum of Illyricum, Iohannes, attacked Slavic settlements, whose population sought shelter in the woods. The Avar attack liberated some Byzantines who were captives and fortifications, though it did not change the chaotic situation in the region as in the next year another Avar-Roman envoy in Illyricum was ambushed by the Sclaveni, while the khagan was planning for the downfall of the Byzantine defense system. Based on the archaeological research of forts, the Avar-Slav devastation of Dalmatia happened in the late 560s and early 570s, with limited inhabitation until the end of the 6th century.

The Byzantine Emperor Maurice (r. 582–602) in his Balkan campaigns (582–602) did not manage to stop the successful siege of Sirmium (580 to 582), though his generals triumphed at Battles of Viminacium (599; also capturing 8,000 Sclaveni), and dealing with Lower Danube/Wallachian Sclaveni rex Musokios and chieftains Ardagast and Peiragastus (593–594). In 599, the Byzantine general Priscus managed to win four victories against the Avars in their homeland, which killed tens of thousands of Avars. Eventually, by 602 Maurice had kept the Avars and Slavs out and successfully re-established the Danube as the border of the empire. However, following the overthrow of Maurice and the resumption of Byzantine-Persian warfare, the Byzantine position in the Balkans declined. Subsequently, the siege of Thessalonica (617; causing the complete collapse of minting coins there), and the destruction of various cities including Justiniana Prima and Salona, culminated with the unsuccessful Siege of Constantinople (626). After the siege, somewhere between 628 and 629, George of Pisidia reported that the Slavs and Avars were fighting "which prevented them from waging a common war", indicating that the Pannonian Slavs managed to liberate themselves from the Avar rule, which itself coincides with the account in De Administrando Imperio about the Croat-Avar war in the Roman province of Dalmatia. It was followed by settlement of the Croats and Serbs in the province of Dalmatia (sometimes considered as movement of a military elite), which was accepted by emperor Heraclius in the scope of bringing peace to the province and making an anti-Avar buffer zone. In the same time also happened, and possibly were related, successful revolt of West Slavs under Samo in Central Europe and Bulgars khan Kubrat in Eastern Europe. Other examples of tribal migrations from the north to south are ethnonyms of Dulebes, Dregoviches, Severians, Obotrites, Glomatians and Milceni.

According to Procopius, Slavic social and political organization was a kind of demokratia in which a council of nobles ruled the tribal community. This allowed Slav tribes to stay together regardless of environmental factors, but according to Johannes Koder, "impeded coordinated military resistance against the enemy", which put them in a situation of being under foreign political leadership. When the Slavs and later the Avars entered the southeast of Europe they lacked advanced siege-warfare tactics, but around 587 they acquired this knowledge from contact with Byzantine culture, and because of this no urban settlement or fort could oppose them any more. With the destruction of Roman fortifications came a loss of Byzantine military and administrative power in Roman provinces. The native population was often decimated, and smaller or larger groups of Slavs settled in the devastated lands. Settlement among the natives, often replacing them, happened in the autumn, when winter supplies were secured for the people and animals. After mixing with the natives who survived in smaller communities, depending on the region, the Slavic tribes mostly had names of toponymic origin.

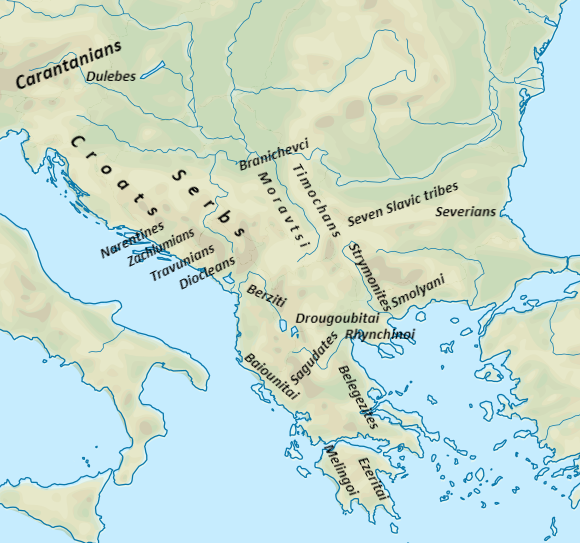
Approximate location of South Slavic tribes, per V. V. Sedov (1995).

The Slavs established dense settlements in Southeast Europe, more precisely in the Praetorian prefecture of Illyricum:

- In the late Roman province of Noricum was the Slavic settlement of the Eastern Alps (including Carantanians).
- In Pannonia were the Pannonian Slavs (with Pannonian Dulebes).
- The province of Dalmatia was settled by the White Croats (and Guduscani), Serbs, Narentines, Zachlumians, Travunijans, and Kanalites.
- Praevalitana was settled by Diocleans.
- The provinces of Moesia and Dardania were inhabited by Merehani, Braničevci, Timočani and Praedenecenti.
- The provinces of Dacia Ripensis and Moesia Secunda were inhabited by Seven Slavic tribes and Severians.
- In part of the Diocese of Thrace were Smolyani and Strymonites.
- In all of the Diocese of Macedonia were numerous tribes of Drougoubitai, Berziti, Sagudates, Rhynchinoi, Baiounitai, Belegezites, Melingoi and Ezeritai. Also, Thomas the Presbyter recorded in 623 that the Slavs "invaded Crete and the other islands. There some blessed men of Qēnneshrē were taken captive and some twenty of them were killed", and scholars consider that Slavic settlement on the island began in the mid-10th century.
- Some Slavs in Thrace were also relocated to Anatolia, and later became known as Asia Minor Slavs.

Eventually, the Slavs who had settled in the former Roman provinces of Pannonia and Dalmatia reached a substantial amount of autonomy or independence, establishing Sklavinias influenced by both Francia and the Byzantine Empire. In turn, the Sklavinias across much of the former dioceses of Dacia and Thracia and the northern half of Macedonia fell under the rule of the First Bulgarian Empire. After the adoption of Orthodox Christianity and Slavonic as a state religion and language, respectively, and the complete Slavicisation of the Turkic Bulgars by the late 800s, the Slavs lost their separate tribal identities and loyalties, replacing them with an overarching Bulgarian one. By contrast, due to lack of political organisation and a far greater number of surviving Greek communities, the Slavs in the south of the Macedonian diocese quickly lost ground to the Byzantines, who recovered first Attica and Thessaly, then Peloponnese, followed by Chalkidiki and Epirus, and after several transfers of Greek speakers from Italy and Asia Minor, most local Slavs had been assimilated by the late 800s. The Byzantine-Norman wars had a devastating effect on the Slavic speakers in the eastern and southern part of present-day Albania, with surviving populations being assimilated into the Albanian-speaking majority. Slavic interaction with the native populations in the Eastern Balkans led to the formation of the Balkan sprachbund.

=== Christianization ===
After the settlement of the Slavs, Church administration – which was controlled by a thick network of Roman bishoprics – collapsed, and most of Southeast Europe turned to paganism and entered the Dark Ages, alongside most of post-Roman Europe. Many Slavs soon began to accept the cultural customs of the highly civilized Roman provinces, and in order to expand their cultural and state influence on the South Slavs, the Roman Church and Ecumenical Patriarchate of Constantinople began the process of Christianization of the Slavs. Martin of Braga already in 558 listed Slavs among baptized barbarians, most probably a reference to the Pannonian Slavs. Pope Gregory I in May 591 advised bishops of Illyricum to accept their colleagues who taken refuge from invasions, in March 592 wrote to prefect of Illyricum about barbarian devastations, and by July 600 the Slavs were already attacking Eastern Adriatic coast. Some dioeceses vanished from historical sources, like Virunum (Zollfeld) and Poetovio (Ptuj) by 579, Celea (Celje) and Emona (Ljubljana) by 588, and Teurnia (Spittal an der Drau) and Aguntum (Lienz) by 591. Pope Agatho in a letter to Byzantine emperor Constantine IV regarding the Third Council of Constantinople (680–681) mentioned that many Roman Church bishops are active "in the middle of the barbarians - the Lombards and Slavs, as well as the Franks, Goths and Britons". A mid-8th century episcopal notitia mentions Slavs among many others as part of the territorial jurisdiction of the Roman Church.

=== Lifestyle ===
According to archaeological data and historical sources, the Slavs mostly travelled along the river valleys, but in the Southern Balkans, they travelled where they encountered greater resistance by the native Byzantine Greek forces, along the mountain ranges. Soon after their arrival the Slavic archaeological culture changed under the influence of native and Byzantine cultures. They mostly were engaged in agriculture, cultivating proso millet, which they introduced, wheat, but also flax. They grew various fruits and vegetables, and learned viticulture. They were actively engaged in animal husbandry, using horses for military and agricultural purposes, and raising oxen and goats. Those living in hilly terrain mostly lived as shepherds. Those living near lakes, rivers, and seas also used various hooks and nets for fishing. They were known to be especially skilled in woodworking and shipbuilding, but also knew about metalworking and pottery.

== Archaeology and linguistics ==
=== Earliest archaeological findings ===
For now archaeologically the earliest Slavic sites and artifacts in Moldova are dated to the 5th century, in Romania since the 6th century (or not later than mid-6th century), from there to Transylvania in the mid-6th century (with Gepids assimilation and additional Slavic waves since the mid-7th century). In the northern regions of the Carpathian Basin (from Tisza River to Western Slovakia) the presence of Slavs is archaeologically confirmed in the first half of the 6th century. In Southwestern Hungary (southwest of Lake Balaton) near the border with Slovenia and Croatia, specifically in Northeastern Slovenia, are radiocarbon dated to the first third of the 6th century (and probably settled in the southwestern part of the Carpathian Basin before the arrival of Lombards). In Bulgaria and countries of former Yugoslavia since late 6th and early 7th century, while Greece surely only since the 7th century (although military invasions could be argued since the mid-6th century).

=== Migration routes (archaeology) ===
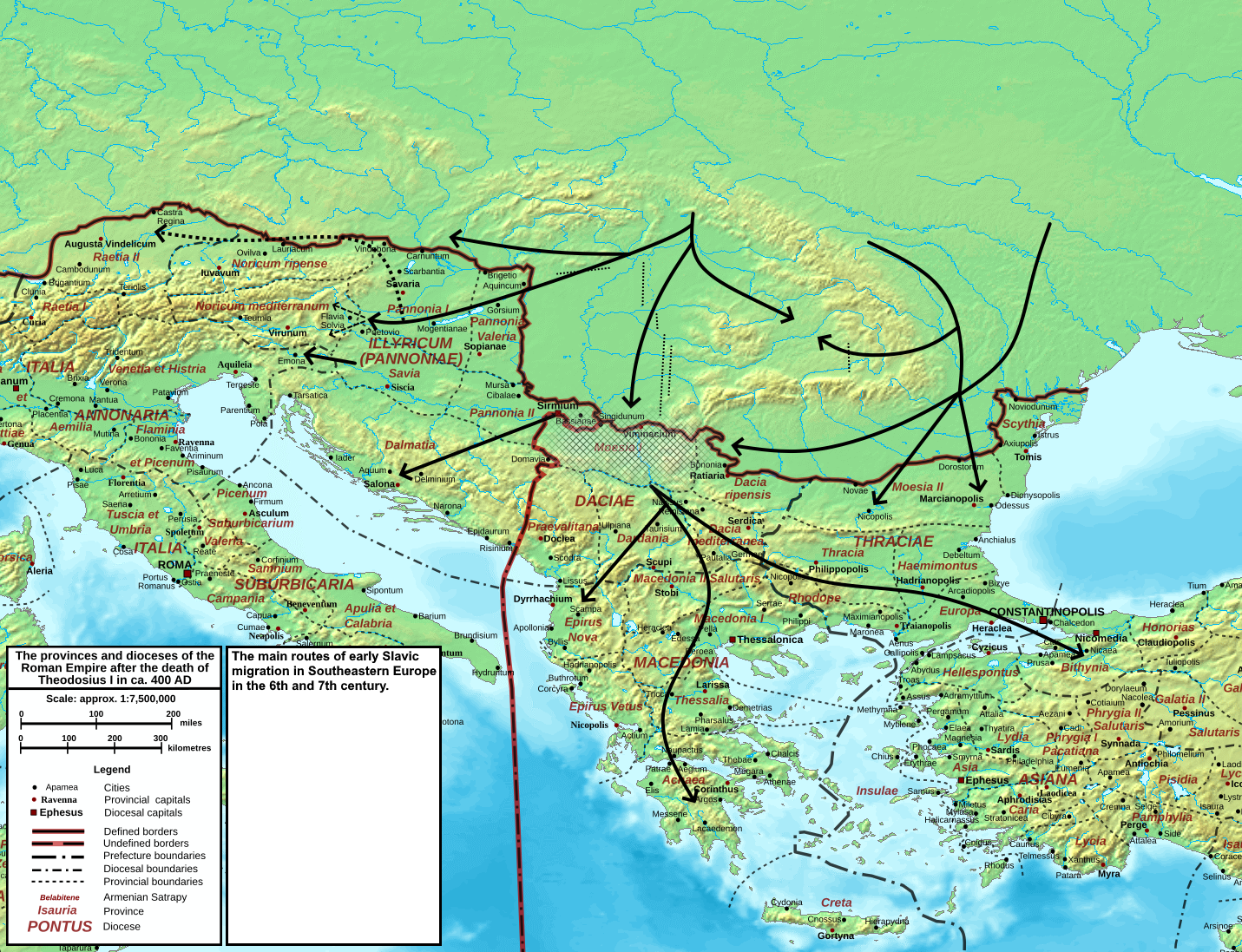
Assumed main migration routes of South Slavs according to archaeological data (per Comșa 1972; Teodor 1984; Sedov 1995; Janković 2015; Radičević 2015; Stanciu 2015; König 2022; Kazanski 2023; Pleterski 2024).

According to the archaeological, historical and linguistic data the main movement of the Slavs started in the Western Ukraine (river Dniester) and South(-eastern) Poland (river Vistula), from the Eastern Carpathians alongside Tisza river to the Middle Danube inside the Carpathian Basin, and alongside Dniester and Prut to the Lower Danube outside the Carpathian Basin. Sclaveni of Prague-Korchak culture mostly moved to the Middle Danube region, while Antae of Penkovka culture to the Lower Danube region, but the Ipotesti–Candesti culture in Romania was composed of a mixture of both Sclaveni's Prague-Korchak and Antae's Penkovka cultures with some elements of the so-called Martynivka culture. Sclaveni and Prague-Korchak culture were present in the western part (East of the Carpathians and river Siret in Romania), while Antae and Penkovka culture the eastern part (around river Prut in Moldavia and Dobruja) of the Lower Danube region. However, the Penkovka sites in Podolia and Moldova also contain Prague-Korchak ceramics, suggesting rather a mixed Prague-Penkovka culture. In the Carpathian Basin, Prague-Korchak culture was observed in the settlement territory of both the Lombards and Avars, and Penkovka culture in the latter as well.

A pattern of settlement movement can be observed from lands north and northeast of the Carpathians, with Upper Tisza in the Carpathian Basin as transitory territory. Pottery in Northwestern Romania can be grouped into (1) Prague-Korchak culture (2) Penkovka and Kolochin culture (3) and Lazuri-Pişcolt horizon from the mid-6th century with analogies in Northwestern Ukraine, Southern Belarus, Southeastern Poland, and Slovakia (with Upper Vistula and San river Polish sites argued as a bridge to Northwestern Romania). The distribution of clay "breadcakes", related to house ovens, found in the Upper Tisza and Lower Danube regions of Romania and to the north of the Carpathians (basins of Teteriv, Bug and Upper Vistula river) also show "probable indication of the territory of origin and the directions of the Early Slavs' migrations". Elements of Penkovka were also present in the Middle Danube region in the Carpathian Basin. First wave of Slavic settlers in Bulgaria were around forts and related to Antae of Penkovka culture (probably as Byzantine foederati), while second wave by Sclaveni with different ceramics with analogies in Muntenia and Slovakia settled away of such locations. Sites from Silistra with Korchak culture pottery were dated to the end of the 6th century.

The southeastern(-Romanian) part of the Carpathian Basin is usually considered to have been settled by a movement from Lower Danube in east–west direction, but is also possible a north–south direction along Tisza Plain. Meanwhile, the area of Transylvanian Basin was settled from both west–east direction of intra-Carpathian Basin (Upper Tisza) and east–west direction of Eastern Carpathians (Upper Olt and mountain passes). Based on historical and archaeological data is usually considered that the majority of Slavs south of Danube originate from Middle Danube region. The migrations are considered to have been divided into two main waves, one crossing the Lower Danube (in Romania), second crossing the Middle Danube around the Iron Gates (border between Serbia and Romania). Based on findings of different types of fibulae and pottery identified with the Slavs on banks of Danube around Iron Gates, and their analogies, archaeologists hypothesize movement of a part of Slavs from an area of today's Serbian Danube in southeast direction through Southern Bulgaria-Constantinople-Asia Minor, and south direction along Great Morava and Vardar river to Thessaly and Peloponnese. Findings of fibula, and anthropomorphic and zoomorphic figurines of Martynivka type-culture, often associated with the Antae are found all over the Balkans, but association of Martynivka there with Antae or Slavs could be doubtful.

In the territory of Croatia, Bosnia and Herzegovina and Serbia early Slavic findings were attributed to the Prague-Korchak culture, and later to another wave with wheel-turned pottery of Danubian type ceramics, possibly related to Penkovka culture. The sites in Vojvodina, Serbia have paralles with findings from both Middle and Lower Danube and Sava Basin, with analogies showing that the southeastern part of Serbian Danube region most probably was settled by Slavs of Ipotești–Cândești culture. The site at Mušići in Bosnia and Herzegovina "have served as an analogy for the most of the material from the sites in Central and Western Balkans". Highest concentration of sites in the Western Balkans have been found in modern-day Dalmatia, with the one at Kašić near Zadar considered as "the oldest archaeological trace of the Croats on the ground of Dalmatia". Serbian archaeologist Đorđe Janković considered that the Serbian Danube ornamental ceramic pots' with analogies northwest of the Carpathian Basin (in Moravia and Austria) are evidence of the Serbian migration from the northwest to the Danube region with consent of the Byzantine Empire, but such hypothesis based on ceramics is not well substantiated as closer ceramic analogies exist in Lower Danube and Wallachian region. Some findings in Herzegovina and Montenegro were also attributed to the Serbs arriving with other Slavs from the Danubian region, however, the general ethnic attribution of specific archaeological findings to the tribe of Croats and Serbs are highly disputable because are mainly based on territorial analogies from DAI and "exist great differences and disputes among archaeologists, as well as among interpretations of historians, when it comes to immigration of Slavs, i.e. tribes of Croats and Serbs to the Balkans". Based on historical circumstances, one route of Slavic-Avar invasion went from Sirmium along Drina river through Zvornik to Bosnia and Salona in Dalmatia.

The region north of Sava river was in the 6th century settled from the Western Middle Danube area, and then in the 7th century another group of Slavs with pottery made on a tournette settled the Sava river region (including Dalmatia and other parts of Western Balkans). Based on archaeological and linguistical evidence (as Slovene language has many dialects and both South Slavic and West Slavic influences; and Slavic toponym and onomastics of Eastern Alps), the Ljubljana Gap could be considered as a crossroad of different tribal movements (mainly of Prague-Korchak culture), of at least two migrations, first after 500 AD and second before 700 AD.

The distribution of the cremation burials and archaic Prague-pottery associated with the early Slavs shows higher density at the periphery, especially western, of the Avar Khaganate in the Middle Danube region. In the central-eastern part of the Carpathian Basin, the early Slavic and Avar settlements were separated by the Devil's Dykes (limes sarmaticus). Avars also constructed a new dyke system in eastern Transylvania against the Slavs, but considering the amount of Slavic cultural remains in the Transylvanian Basin, that dyke didn't manage to serve its purpose. The grave artifacts of the Slavic community and its tribal leaders of Nușfalău-Someșeni group in northwestern Romania showed close relations with the Avars. That community was identified by scholars with the West Slavs, White Croats and most probably East Slavs in general. A mid-6th century graves with prestigious artefacts found at Regensburg-Grossprüfening in Bavaria Slavica indicate resettlement of an elite Pannonian-Middle Danubian Slavic military group running away from the Avar expansion in the western part of the Carpathian Basin. Hans Losert also related the finding with a cremation cemetery at Enns near Linz in Upper Austria. The territory of Upper and Lower Austria was settled by Slavs of Prague-Korchak culture (with some additional migrations from the north, and Carantania), who were steadily assimilated by the Bavarians. In the southern Carpathian Basin Bijelo Brdo culture developed around the mid-10th century when the Hungarians arrived.

=== Migration routes (linguistics) ===
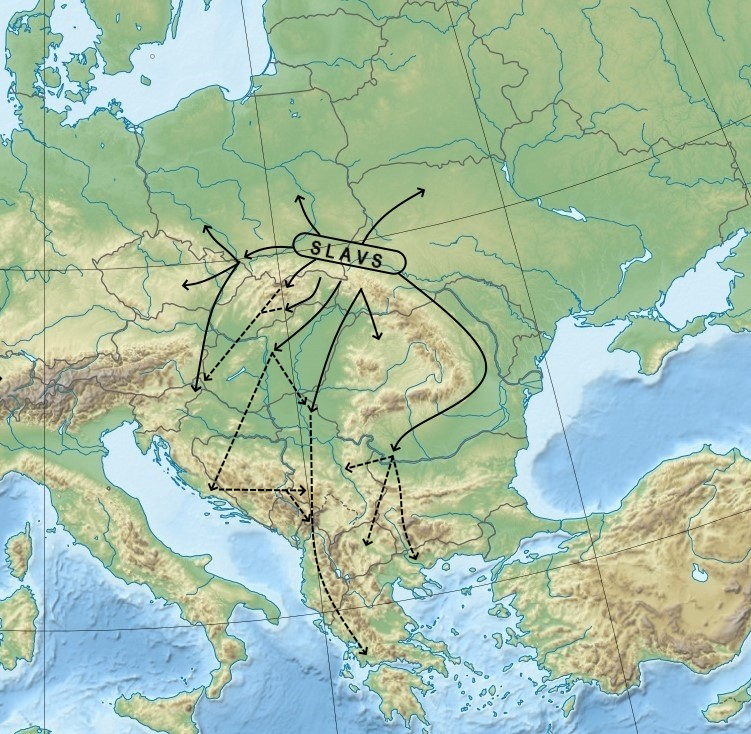
Rough reconstruction of the main migration routes of the early Slavs according hydronyms (per Udolph 1979, 2016, 2024; Rončević 1998).

Henrik Birnbaum, Jürgen Udolph among others based on the distribution and concentration of Old Slavic hydronyms (apelatives and names), since the 1970s concluded that the beginning point of early Slavic migration was "on the northern slope of the Carpathian Mountains, approximately between Bukovina and Kraków". According to Udolph the "migration of the South Slavs takes place in two big, yet separate flows, on the one hand through the Moravian Gate to Slovenia, Hungary and Croatia, and on the other hand on the Eastern edge of the Carpathian Mountains to Serbia and Bulgaria". However, distribution of different water words show different paths which are not necessarily reaching the same conclusions, for example "*jьzvorъ, bagno, sigla, stubel" could indicate "immigration from the Moravian Gate across eastern Austria and Hungary to Slovenia and Croatia, and further to Albania and western Serbia as far as western Greece. The other immigration took place along the Carpathian arc through Bukovina, Moldova, Dobruja (partly through Romania/Transylvania) and the lower Danube as far as Bulgaria and eastern Greece". Although based on hydronymy data, Dunja Brozović Rončević noted that Udolph advanced the idea that the Slavs were more oriented toward the mountains than the swamps and rivers which is contradicting historical sources, and consciously decided to use a limited data, not taking into account dialectological lexical richness which shows much broader distribution of specific words. In her research of Croatian hydronymy corpus which also included dialectological material, came to a similar conclusion as Udolph, which consideration about two separate flows explained in more details: the so-called "Southwestern Slavic group" moved in four directions, first from southern Moravia toward Eastern Alps, second from central and western Slovakia toward Eastern Alps, third from central and eastern Slovakia toward Budapest from where one moved to Croatia-Bosnia and other to northern Serbia, and fourth from Carpathian Ukraine toward southeast; the so-called "Southeastern Slavic group" moved from Ukraine along eastern slopes of the Carpathians to Romania, Bulgaria, North Macedonia and eastern Serbia.

Henning Andersen considered that the "innovation PPS wirē-tla-" was "transmitted to the Balkan Peninsula through Pannonia", while "PPS staubili-, staubilā" was "transported southward to central and eastern South Slavic". Zbigniew Gołąb, partly based on Oleg Trubachyov research, concluded that the "main route taken by the ancestors of the Southern Slavs in their migration south towards the Danube was the ancient trail through the central Carpathian passes ... northeastern Pannonia i.e., later sub-Carpathian Ruthenia. From that transitional stage the Southern Slavs later moved to the Danube River along two separate routes, one more western, another more eastern (through Transylvania).

South Slavic languages constitute a dialect continuum, but "they may have arrived in the Carpathian basin with some preexisting dialect divisions (see Ramovš 1933 and Andersen 1999), but little is known about early linguistic distinctions among the Western South Slavs". According to Frederik Kortlandt the early Slavs who later spoke various Bulgarian and Serbo-Croatian dialects migrated across Moldavia and Pannonia. He considers that according to isoglosses "major dialect divisions of Slavic were already established" by the 4th and 6th century, and "that the earliest dialectal diversity in western South Slavic goes back to the time before the migrations of the Slavs from their original Trans-Carpathian homeland". However, in all South Slavic languages can be found analogies with East and West Slavic languages, which is implying that the early Slavs did not migrate in some distinctively separate linguistic waves but as intermixed groups with predominance of a specific proto-dialect.

Linguistic relationship between South Slavic and "North Slavic" could indicate a location of the original homeland around the Carpathians, as asserted by Ivan Popović, with the Slovene(-Czech) to the west, Serbo-Croatian(-Slovak, particularly Central Slovak dialect) in the middle, and Serbo-Croatian and Bulgarian-Macedonian(-East Slavic) to the east of this area. He concluded that the "immigration of the Slavs into the Alps, Pannonia, Dacia and the Balkans occurred in two separate main waves, although more or less everywhere at the same time. The two main waves resulted in two main groups of southern languages: a western one, which was later to be divided into Serbo-Croatian and Slovenian, and an eastern one (Bulgarian, Old Church Slavonic, Macedonian)". According to him, at the time of migration or prior to it, Western South Slavic (WSS) was a "largely uniform common" language, but if attempted a "prehistoric dialect division" per isoglosses until the 9th century, it would be divided into a sub-western part (Slovenian, Kajkavian, Chakavian and Shchakavian dialects) and sub-eastern part (Shtokavian dialect). However, although similar WSS division is accepted by linguists (including instead Western and Eastern Shtokavian), Popović's early dating of WSS dialect division is unfounded as it dates to the post-migration period.

Pavle Ivić also noted that some old isoglosses in South Slavic are of pre-migratory origin, and that "before that migration, the Western South Slavic situation was characteristic of the dialects spoken in the Pannonian plain, and the Eastern situation characteristic of those in the Dacian plains, which were separated from the former by the Carpathian mountains north of the Iron Gate". A bundle of isoglosses between them around the Serbian-Bulgarian boundary could be explained by different hypotheses, most probably existence of Romance and Albanian-speaking population and eastward movement of Western South Slavs. Another group of old isoglosses are separating Slovenian and Kajkavian from the Shtokavian and Chakavian (excluding Northwestern Chakavian), and that those "northwesternmost South Slavic dialects once constituted a kind of transition between the South and the West Slavic linguistic groups". As noted by Aleksandar Loma, old isogloss "*tj/*dj > *šć/đ versus *št/žd" is roughly separating Slovenian, Kajkavian, Chakavian and Western Shtokavian linguistic area from Eastern Shtokavian, Bulgarian, Macedonian and Romanian linguistic area.

The migrations of ancient Proto-Slavic dialectisms possibly can be seen in the vocabulary, like in the distribution of lexemes "dъždь-kiša", "*želězo-gvožđe", "*sad´a-čađ", and words for different types of plough. Bogo Grafenauer considered that the first wave of Slavs to the Eastern Alps and Northern Istria came from the north from West Slavic area of Pannonia, while second wave including the Croats came from the east from South Slavic area. Ludmila Vergunova in her research of lexical isoglosses of Proto-Slavic words (e.g. *polnъ, *gora, *golь/*golina, *dĕlъ, *bьrdo, *slopъ, *solpъ, *skokъ, *bъlkъ/*bъlčь, *jьzvorь, *pьrtь, *brьvь/*brьva, *rapa/*ropa, *bara) and South Slavic lexical synonyms (*vatra/*ogьnь; *kqtja/*hiža/*izba; *sedlo/*vьsь; *lĕsь/gvozd; *ostrovъ/*otokъ) found that "Ukrainian Carpathian and sub-Carpathian dialects and east Slovak dialects ... have numerous correspondences with the southeastern part of the central Balkan peninsula", while Slovenian, Kajkavian, (Northern) Chakavian-island and some Macedonian dialects "do not share ancient lexical and semantic isoglosses with the east Carpathian region", possibly being "remnants of the language of the first wave of Slavic settlers of the era of Avar-Slavic contacts". Joseph Schallert and Marc L. Greenberg regarding the distribution of lexeme "*gъlčěti" (in the same meaning of verb 'speak, talk' like "*govoriti", but also onomatopoeic 'make noise' and pejorative 'scold'), concluded it was brought from northeastern Danubian plain to Bulgaria, but also to Slovenia and Croatia (with Slovene Pannonian dialect group probably being of southeastern Danube-Sava basin origination), but has total absence in other Shtokavian-speaking countries and Macedonia. Ekaterina Yakushkina also found lexical isoglosses of Proto-Slavic synonyms between western and eastern parts of the Serbo-Croatian dialect continuum, as well between Western and Eastern Shtokavian. Mijo Lončarić and Pavao Krmpotić concluded that the Slovenian and Kajkavian as South Slavic dialects made a dialect continuum with West Slavic languages, specifically Central Slovak which shows basic South Slavic features, before the arrival of the Hungarians to the Carpathian Basin. A. Loma, based on onomastics and lexemes, indicated possible migration of one wave to the Balkans from an area of today's Western Russia.

Based on toponymic research, Yordan Zaimov considered that the Slavs crossed Danube around Vidin, smaller wave went eastward alongside the river, while the main wave went southward alongside Timok and Great Morava rivers, divided into two sub-waves, one went to Macedonia, Tessaly, Albania (where, probably with Slavic incursions or interaction, was formed so-called Komani-Kruja culture), Greece, Peloponnese and Crete, another went to the northern coast of the Aegean Sea and Sea of Marmara.

P. Ivić considered that the linguistic evidence is in contradiction with the arrival of Croats and Serbs from northwest as described in DAI, F. Dvornik argued they could not make a linguistic influence because arrived as a small elite, while A. Loma concluded that the DAI account "corresponds to the truth" as onomastic evidence supports migration of the Serbs and Croats from an area between rivers Elbe and Vistula.

=== Spreading of Slavic language ===
Some scholars like Horace Lunt and Florin Curta considered that Proto-Slavic became the lingua franca of the Avar Khaganate, which helped spread the Slavic language in Southeastern Europe.

Alan Timberlake concluded that the Slavic language in Southeastern Europe was spread mostly by the migration of the Slavs (demic diffusion). Its rapid expansion was facilitated by sparse colonization, military prowess, portable agriculture, their population growth, constant depopulation of the natives which started before the arrival of the Slavs, Slavic assimilation of captured people (particularly women and children), and eventual adoption of the language by coexisting peoples. According to him, a simple language shift is not possible in unstable coexistence (as natives south of Danube were constantly raided by the Slavs), and Slavic was not a trade language nor a lingua franca nor part of a wave model, as did not happen radical simplification and creolization of it. H. Andersen in his research of Slavic phonology, morphology and lexemes found reflections of various expansions, which "supports the interpretation that the Common Slavic koiné was not a creation of the Avar period, as some have thought, but was a developing interethnic means of communication well before the 500s".

Jouko Lindstedt and Elina Salmela also concluded that the spread of Proto-Slavic was due to migration and founder effect, and "not attributable to a lingua-franca function in a great area, as is often surmised", because such reasoning is contradicted with lack of historical knowledge about the languages in use in the Avar Khaganate, lack of Avar's influence outside of the Carpathian Basin, the fact that the Slavs became widespread ethnic population before the arrival of the Avars, and "the Slavic of the expansion period does not exhibit changes that are typical of lingua francas ... Late Proto-Slavic (or Common Slavic) remained a morphologically complex language, and its complicated accentological system in particular ... shows no trace of a possible lingua-franca function". In the case of South Slavic, they propose migration alongside mixing with native population, a "language shifts to and from Slavic", "whereas the much earlier shift to Slavic in the Byzantine Balkans was probably motivated by the openness of the Slavic tribal groups, which remained the only kind of local social structure after the partial collapse of the imperial structures due to the Justinianic Plague".

== Genetics ==
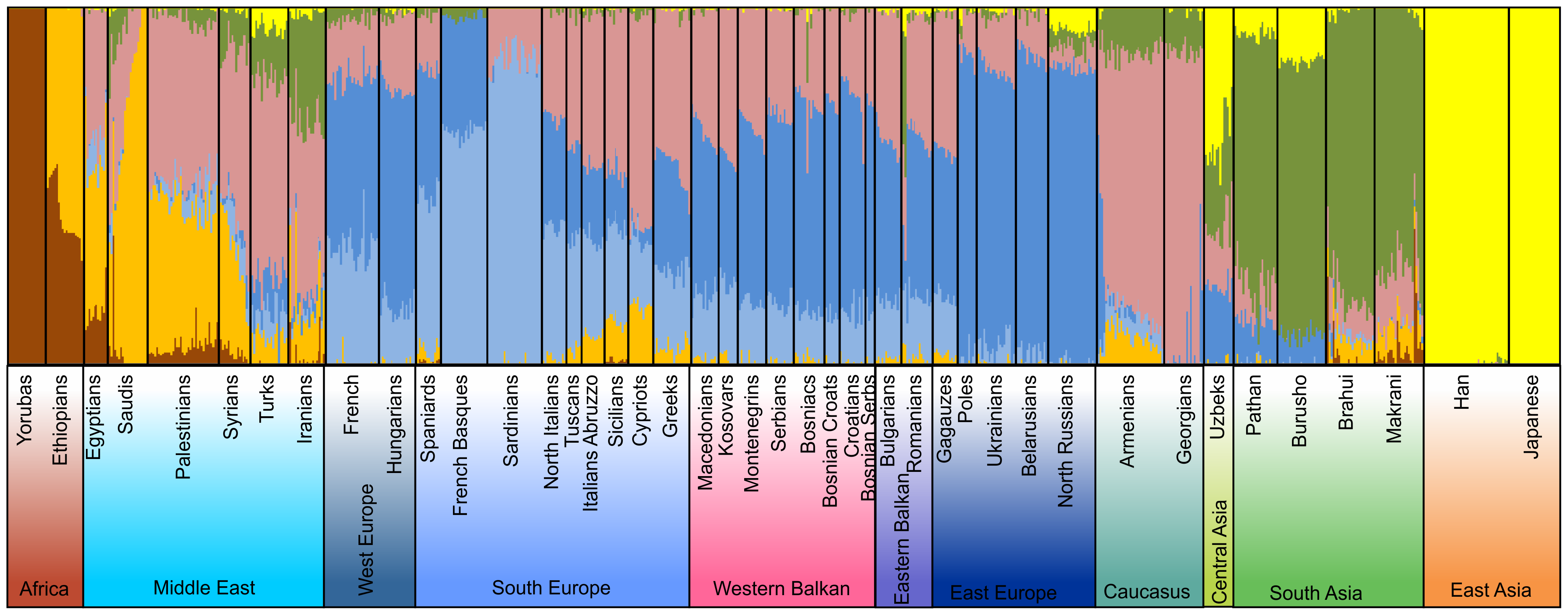
Admixture analysis of autosomal SNPs of the Southeast Europe in a global context on the resolution level of 7 assumed ancestral populations: the African (brown), South/West European (light blue), Asian (yellow), Middle Eastern (orange), South Asian (green), North/East European (dark blue) and beige Caucasus component.

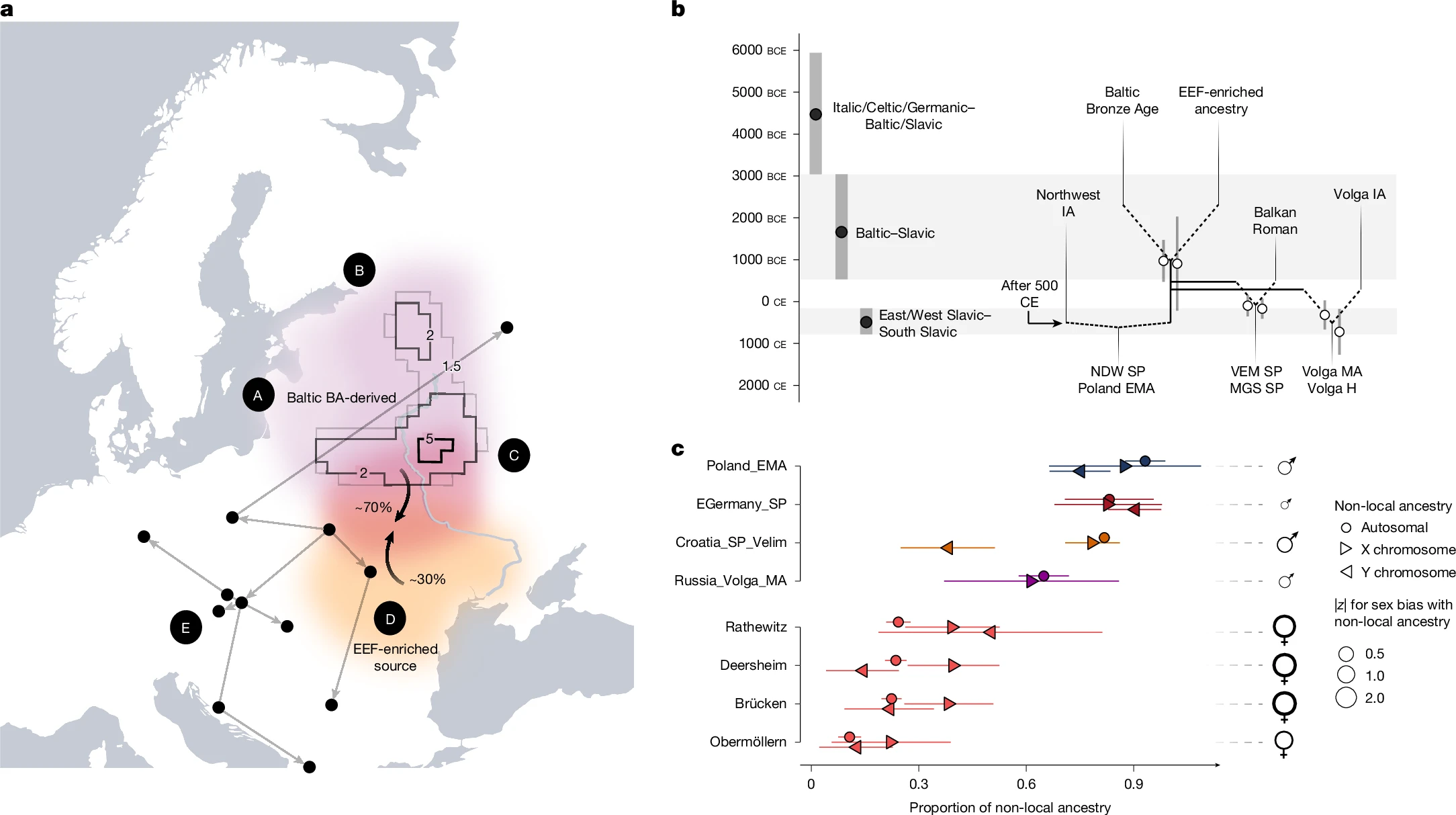
Formation, and putative migration directions of the Slavs during the migration period, per Gretzinger et al. (2025).

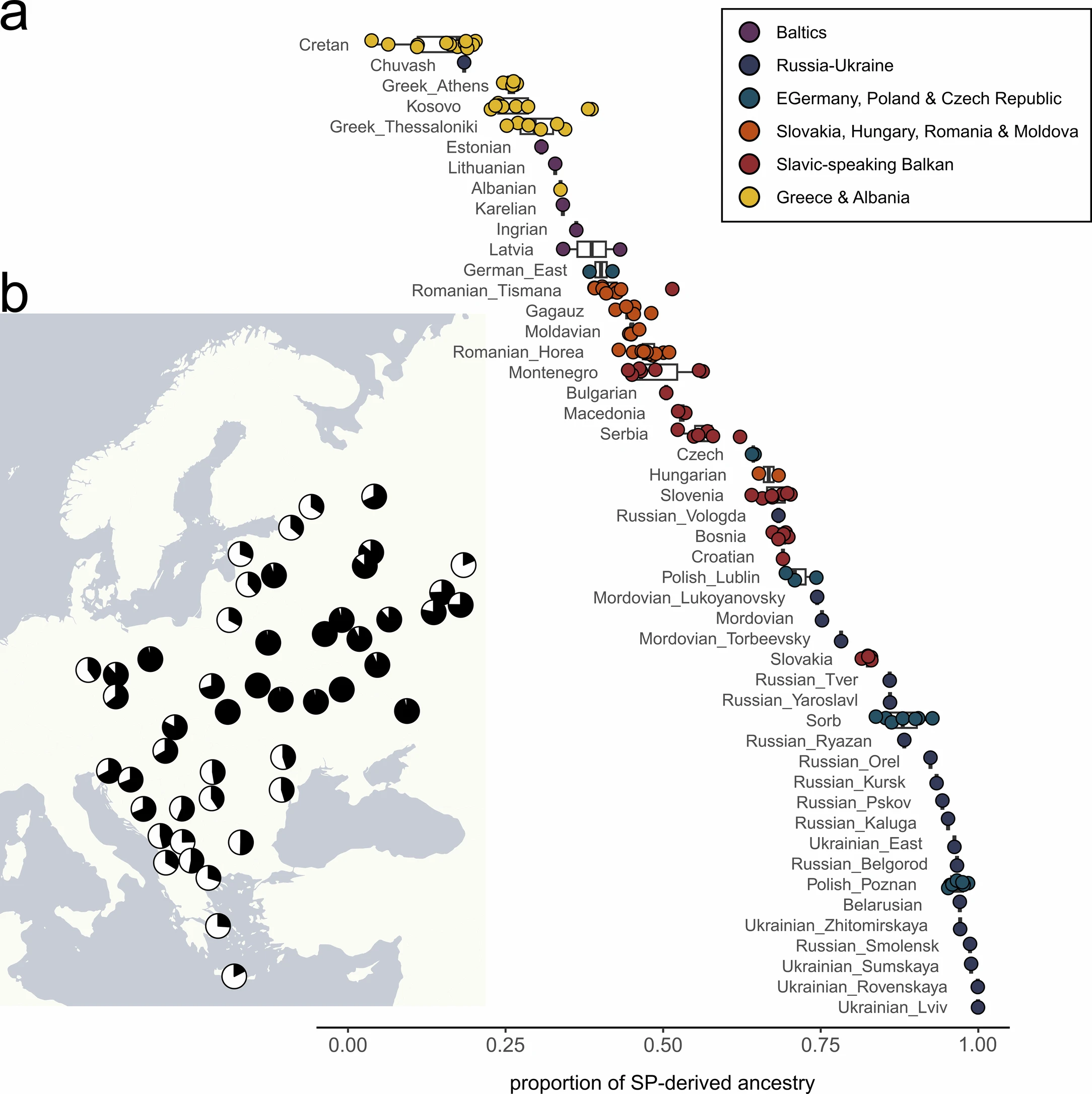
The genetic legacy of the Slavic expansion (black), per Gretzinger et al. (2025).

In the scholarship is expected that population genetics and archaeogenetics will provide important evidence for the debate between a migrationist and a cultural model of the origin and spread of the Slavs as a group of people, ethnic identity, material culture, language and so on. The cultural model is also represented by a more extreme hypothesis of Florin Curta (The Making of the Slavs: History and Archaeology of the Lower Danube Region, 2001), which puts into question the Slavic mass migration, existence of Urheimat, archaeological culture and language, rather considering the Slavs an ethno-political identity formed by political instrumentation and interaction on the Roman Danubian frontier by the Byzantines with the barbarian elite, imposed on the local population. At the same time, extreme versions of the migrationist model have also been subjected to increasing skepticism, with Peter Heather and Catherine Morgan noting in 2015 that "traditional narratives of the Völkerwanderungen (4th–6th cents. ce) assumed that the outsiders moving onto Roman soil had long-established group identities based on shared material and non-material cultural norms. New understandings of ethnicity have combined with reconsiderations of the archaeological and historical sources to undermine this view. The old migration models have consequently required revision". Additionally, numerous researchers have cautioned against conflating language, archaelogy, ethnicity, and historical periods with the ethnonym "Slavic" due to identity politics, for example, Steffen Patzold in 2025 has commented that "clearly, the adjective 'Slavic' cannot mean the same thing when referring to a historical era, an archaeological culture, a language family, a human group and an individual ... It is high time for new terminology that enables science to be distanced from the political uses and abuses of ethnonyms. Interdisciplinary collaboration will be key to this endeavour".

According to the 2013 autosomal IBD survey "of recent genealogical ancestry over the past 3,000 years at a continental scale", the speakers of Serbo-Croatian language share a very high number of common ancestors dated to the migration period approximately 1,500 years ago with Poland and Romania-Bulgaria cluster among others in Eastern Europe. The authors consider this similarity to consistent with the Hunnic and Slavic expansion, which was a "relatively small population that expanded over a large geographic area", particularly "the expansion of the Slavic populations into regions of low population density beginning in the sixth century" and that it is "highly coincident with the modern distribution of Slavic languages." Furthermore, in the same study, "Greek and Macedonian samples share much higher numbers of common ancestors with Albanian speakers than with other neighbors," a finding the authors attribute to "historical migrations" or possibly to "smaller effects of the Slavic expansion in these populations." According to Kushniarevich et al. 2015, the Hellenthal et al. 2014 IBD analysis, also found "multi-directional admixture events among East Europeans (both Slavic and non-Slavic), dated to around 1,000–1,600 YBP" which coincides with "the proposed time-frame for the Slavic expansion". The Slavic influence is "dated to 500-900 CE or a bit later with over 40-50% among Bulgarians, Romanians, and Hungarians". The 2015 IBD analysis found that the South Slavs have lower proximity to Greeks than with East Slavs and West Slavs and that there's an "even patterns of IBD sharing among East-West Slavs–'inter-Slavic' populations (Hungarians, Romanians and Gagauz)–and South Slavs, i.e. across an area of assumed historic movements of people including Slavs". The slight peak of shared IBD segments between South and East-West Slavs suggests a shared "Slavonic-time ancestry". According to a recent admixture analysis, the South Slavs show a genetic uniformity, with a modeled ancestral genetic component in the study peaking in Baltic speakers, being high in East Slavs (80-95%) as well as Western and North-Western Europeans (Germans, Orcadians, Swedes), and between 55 and 70% among South Slavs. According to George Stamatoyannopoulos et al. 2017 admixture study of Peloponnesian Greek population, "the Slavic ancestry of Peloponnesean subpopulations ranges from 0.2 to 14.4%".

The 2006 Y-DNA haplotype study suggests "that the Slavic expansion started from the territory of present-day Ukraine, thus supporting the hypothesis that places the earliest known homeland of Slavs in the basin of the middle Dnieper", with the Y-STR variation showing paternal homogeneity centered on present-day Ukraine among Eastern Slavs (e.g. Russians, Belarusians), Western Slavs (e.g. Poles, Slovaks), and certain groups of Southern Slavs (e.g. Slovens, Croats), whereas all remaining Southern Slavs (e.g. Serbians, Macedonians, Bulgarians) constituted a distinct group, but "the most likely explanation for this phenomenon" is the "contribution of the Y chromosomes of peoples who settled in the region before the Slavic expansion to the genetic heritage of Southern Slavs". According to genetic studies until 2020, the distribution, variance and frequency of the Y-DNA haplogroups R1a and I2 and their subclades R-M558, R-M458 and I-CTS10228 among South Slavs are in correlation with the spreading of Slavic languages during the medieval Slavic expansion from Eastern Europe, most probably from the territory of present-day Ukraine and Southeastern Poland.

Alena Kushniarevich and Alexei Kassian in 2020 considered that "there is a substantial closeness between West and East Slavs and Baltic speakers, whereas South Slavs are clearly differentiated and genetically akin to other non-Slavic Balkan peoples", which "suggests that the distribution of Slavic languages was chiefly due to the cultural assimilation (via language shift) of pre-Slavic people rather than to the replacement of the autochthonous population by the Slavs".

A 2022 archaeogenetic study published in Science compared ancient, medieval and modern population samples and found that the medieval Slavic migrations "profoundly affected the region", resulting in the reduction of Anatolian Neolithic ancestry in Southeastern Europe. Pre-Slavic Southeast European populations have the most Anatolian Neolithic component of ancestry, whereas present-day Slavs outside the Southeast Europe have the least, "with present-day people from Southeastern Europe intermediate between the two extremes". Among present-day populations "Greeks and Albanians have more Anatolian Neolithic ancestry than their South Slavic neighbors". A 2023 archaeogenetic study published in Cell, based on a sample of 146 individuals, showed that both migration and ethnogenesis were important for the spread of Slavic language and culture. According to the study, a large-scale migration of people genetically similar to modern Eastern European Slavic-speakers to the Balkans after the end of the Roman rule accounts for 30-60% of the ancestry of Balkan people. The study ruled out a complete demographic replacement, as they "observe[d] significant proportions of Iron Age Balkan-related and Anatolian-related ancestry across the Medieval period up to the present". In a press interview article based on the same study David Reich stated "there have been debates about how impactful these migrations were and to what extent the spread of Slavic language was largely through cultural influences or movements of people, but our study shows that these migrations had a profound demographic effect" as "more than half of the ancestry of most peoples in the Balkans today comes from the Slavic migrations, with around a third Slavic ancestry even in countries like Greece where no Slavic languages are spoken today". The early medieval Slavic admixture was calculated to be 66.5±2.7% in Croats, 58.4±2.1% in Serbs, 55.4±2.4% in Romanians, 51.2±2.2% in Bulgarians, 31±5.3% in Albanians, 29.9-40.2% in Peloponnese and Macedonia Greeks, 17.9-19.7% in Cretan and Cyclades Greeks, and 3.5±2.2% in Dodecanese Greeks. The big data set also showed that the Y-DNA haplogroups I2a-L621 and R1a-Z282 are absent in the antiquity and appear only since the Early Middle Ages "always associated with Eastern European related ancestry in the autosomal genome, which supports that these lineages were introduced in the Balkans by Eastern European migrants during the Early Medieval period".

A 2025 comprehensive archaeogenetic study published in Nature confirmed previous conclusions, showing how Slavic period admixture "follows a North-to-South cline, representing 67% to 69% of the ancestry in Bosnians, Croatians, and Slovenians, 40% to 56% of the ancestry in Serbs, Macedonians, Bulgarians, Montenegrians, (Romance-speaking) Romanians, (Romance-speaking) Moldavians and (Turkic-speaking) Gagauz, as well as 17% to 34% of the ancestry in Greeks, Cretans, Albanians and Kosovars (with slightly higher proportions in Greeks from Thessaloniki compared to Greeks from Athens)". Unlike regions further north and west where the local gene pool was almost entirely replaced, Slavic-related migration in the Balkans involved extensive intermingling and genetic assimilation with the local population rather than a total demographic displacement. Using qpAdm modeling to estimate ancestry for present-day groups, the researchers found that Eastern European ancestry is (pre)dominant in all Slavic-speaking populations today. As evidenced by the presence of Slavic-related individuals dating between 500 BCE and 300 CE, there was also sporadic gene flow related to Slavic migrations from Eastern Europe into Pannonia and the Balkans during the Iron Age and Roman Age. A 2026 genetic study published in Nature, analyzing ancient and modern DNA data, revealed that present-day Albanians are predominantly descend from an indigenous Western Balkan population, with a Medieval East European-related admixture averaging 10–20% across present-day Albanians.

== See also ==
- Extreme weather events of 535–536
- Outline of Slavic history and culture
- Pre-modern human migration

== Sources ==
- Andersen, Henning (2020). "On the formation of the Common Slavic koiné". In Tomáš Klír; Vít Boček; Nicolas Jansens (eds.). New Perspectives on the Early Slavs and the Rise of Slavic: Contact and Migrations (PDF). Heidelberg: Universitätsverlag Winter. pp. 11–42. ISBN 978-3-8253-4707-9.
- Andersen, Henning (2023). "The Slavic Expansion. Streams, Springs, and Wells". Scando-Slavica. 69 (1): 39–87. doi:10.1080/00806765.2023.2188609.
- Bekić, Luka (2020). "Neki materijalni dokazi slavenskih pohoda u romansko područje uzduž istočne obale Jadrana" [Some material evidence of Slavic incursions into Romanic territory along the eastern coast of the Adriatic]. Diadora (in Croatian and English). 33–34 (33–34): 347–357.
- Comșa, Maria (1972). "Directions et étapes de la pénétration des Slaves vers la Péninsule Balkanique aux 6-7 siècles, avec un regard spécial sur le territoire de la Roumanie" [Directions and stages of the penetration of the Slavs towards the Balkan Peninsula in the 6-7 centuries, with a special look at the territory of Romania]. Balcanoslavica (in French). 1. Prilep, Beograd: 9–28.
- Cosma, Călin (2022). "Avar Artifacts in Slavic Barrow Cremation Cemeteries From Transylvania and Northwestern Romania". In Papeša, Anita Rapan; Dugonjić, Anita (eds.). Avars and Slavs: Two Sides of the Belt Strap End - Avars on the North and the South of the Khaganate, proceedings of the international scientific conference held in Vinkovci 2020. Zagreb, Vinkovci: Arheološki muzej u Zagrebu, Gradski muzej Vinkovci. pp. 344–355. ISBN 978-953-8143-58-8.
- Curta, Florin (2001). The Making of the Slavs: History and Archaeology of the Lower Danube Region, c.500–700. Cembridge University. ISBN 978-1-139-42888-0.
- Curta, Florin (2020). Slavs in the Making: History, Linguistics, and Archaeology in Eastern Europe (ca. 500-ca. 700). London: Routledge. doi:10.4324/9780203701256. ISBN 978-0-203-70125-6. S2CID 225265576.
- Dvornik, Francis (1949). The Making of Central and Eastern Europe. London: Polish Research Centre Ltd.
- Dvornik, Francis (1956). The Slavs: Their Early History and Civilization. Boston: American Academy of Arts and Sciences.
- Dvornik, Francis; Jenkins, Romilly; Lewis, Bernard; Moravcsik, Gyula; Obolensky, Dimitri; Runciman, Steven (1962). Jenkins, Romilly (ed.). De Administrando Imperio: Volume II Commentary. London: The Athlone Press, University of London. ISBN 978-0-88402-021-9.
- Ferjančić, Božidar (1984). "Invasions et installations des Slaves dans les Balkans". Villes et peuplement dans l'Illyricum protobyzantin. Actes du colloque de Rome (12-14 mai 1982) (in French). Rome: Publications de l'École française de Rome. pp. 85–109. ISBN 2-7283-0067-4.
- Fine, John V. A. Jr. (1991) [1983]. The Early Medieval Balkans: A Critical Survey from the Sixth to the Late Twelfth Century. Ann Arbor: University of Michigan Press. ISBN 0-472-08149-7.
- Gavritukhin, Igor O.; Kazanski, Michel (2018). "О времени появления славян на территории Молдовы" [About the Time of the Appearance of the Slavs in the Territory of Moldova]. Antiquities. Studies. Issues (in Russian): 227–248.
- Gołąb, Zbigniew (1992). The Origins of the Slavs: A Linguist's View. Columbus: Slavica. ISBN 978-0-89357-231-0.
- Heather, Peter (2010). Empires and Barbarians: The Fall of Rome and the Birth of Europe. Oxford University Press. ISBN 978-0-19-974163-2.
- Hrisimov, Nikolay (2015). "Раннеславянские памятники в северо-восточной части Балканского полуострова" [Early Slavic Sites in the North-Eastern Part of the Balkan Peninsula]. Stratum Plus (in Russian) (5): 309–342.
- Hupchik, Dennis (2002). The Balkans: From Constantinople to Communism. New York: PALGRAVE. ISBN 0-312-29913-3.
- Ivić, Pavle (1972). "Balkan Slavic Migrations in the Light of South Slavic Dialectology". In Henrik Birnbaum, Speros Vryonis (ed.). Aspects of the Balkans: Continuity and Change - Contributions to the International Balkan Conference held at UCLA, October 23–28, 1969. De Gruyter Mouton. pp. 66–86. doi:10.1515/9783110885934-004. ISBN 978-3-11-129036-2.
- Janković, Đorđe (2015). "О славянизации Северной Иллирии и Далмации" [On Slavisation of Northern Illyria and Dalmatia]. Stratum Plus (in Russian) (5): 249–283.
- Kaczyńska, Elwira; Witczak, Krzysztof Tomasz (2019). "The Undying Controversy of the Presence of Slavs on the Island of Crete. Remarks on a New Book by Pantelis Haralampakis". Studia Ceranea. 9 (9): 722–733. doi:10.18778/2084-140X.09.35.
- Kardaras, Georgios (2006). "The Byzantine-Αvar cooperation against the Slavs (578)". Aevum medium: zborník na počesť Jozefa Hošša. Bratislava: Univerzita Komenského Filozofická fakulta. pp. 31–33. ISBN 80-89236-13-8.
- Kardaras, Georgios (2011). "The Settlement of the Croats and Serbs on the Balkans in the Frame of the Byzantine-Avar Conflicts". Bulgaria, the Bulgarians and Europe - Mythus, History, Modernity, Naucia Conference, Veliko Tarnovo 29-31 October 2009. University Press "St. Cyril and Methodius". pp. 91–98. ISBN 978-954-524-776-7.
- Kazanski, Michel (2013). "The Middle Dnieper area in the seventh century: An archaeological survey". Travaux et Mémoires. 17 (1): 769–864. ISBN 978-2-916716-45-9.
- Kazanski, Michel (2020). "Archaeology of the Slavic Migrations" (PDF). Encyclopedia of Slavic Languages and Linguistics Online. BRILL.
- Kazanski, Michel (2023). "Первые контакты дунайских славян и авар: свидетельства византийских авторов и археологии" [First contacts of the Danubian Slavs and Avars: the evidences from the Byzantine writers and archaeology]. Antichnaya Drevnost's I Srednie Veka. 23. Ural University Press: 76–89. doi:10.15826/adsv.2023.51.004.
- Koder, Johannes (2020). "On the Slavic Immigration in the Byzantine Balkans". In Johannes Preiser-Kapeller; Lucian Reinfandt; Yannis Stouraitis (eds.). Migration Histories of the Medieval Afroeurasian Transition Zone: Aspects of Mobility Between Africa, Asia and Europe, 300-1500 C.E. Brill. pp. 81–100. doi:10.1163/9789004425613_004. ISBN 978-90-04-42561-3. S2CID 218997565.
- Komatina, Predrag (2015). "The Church in Serbia at the Time of Cyrilo-Methodian Mission in Moravia". Cyril and Methodius: Byzantium and the World of the Slavs. Thessaloniki: Dimos. pp. 711–718.
- Komatina, Predrag (2019). "Рани јужнословенски етноними и питање порекла и постанка јужнословенских племена" [Early South Slavic Ethnonyms and the Issue of Origin and Genesis of the South Slavic Tribes]. Наслеђе и стварање Свети Ћирило: Свети Сава 869-1219-2019 I (in Serbian). Belgrade: Institute of the Serbian Language of the Serbian Academy of Sciences and Arts. pp. 3–28. ISBN 978-86-82873-70-9.
- Komatina, Predrag (2020). "Славянские этнонимы "баварского географа": историко-лингвистический анализ" [Slavic ethnonyms in the Bavarian Geographer: A historiographic linguistic analysis]. Studia Slavica et Balcanica Petropolitana (in Russian). 27 (1): 106–137. doi:10.21638/spbu19.2020.106. hdl:11701/19440.
- König, Tomáš (2022). "The Early Slavs: from the Western Carpathians to the Adriatic". In Homza, Martin; Holjevac, Željko; Filipec, Krešimir; Vrtel', Andrej (eds.). Studia Carpathico-Adriatica III: From the Carpathians to the Adriatic: The Archeology of the Migration Period and the Middle Ages. Bratislava: Comenius University Bratislava. pp. 38–53. ISBN 978-80-223-5684-8.
- Kortlandt, Frederik (1982). "Early dialectal diversity in South Slavic I". South Slavic and Balkan Linguistics. Studies in Slavic and General Linguistics. Vol. 2. Editions Rodopi B.V., Brill. pp. 177–192. JSTOR 40996889.
- Kortlandt, Frederik (2003). "Early dialectal diversity in South Slavic II". Dutch Contributions to the Thirteenth International Congress of Slavists. Linguistics. Studies in Slavic and General Linguistics. Vol. 30. Editions Rodopi B.V., Brill. pp. 215–235. JSTOR 40997749.
- Kostić, Zorica (2023). "Осврт на нека језичка сведочанства о досељавању словенских племена на југ" [An overview of some linguistic testimonies on the settlement of Slavic tribes in the south]. Journal of the Serbian Archaeological Society (in Serbian). 39: 113–141. doi:10.18485/gsad.2023.39.6.
- Krmpotić, Pavao (2015). "Prilog istraživanju naslijeđenoga slavenskog leksika u hrvatskim kajkavskim govorima" [On the Proto-Slavic inherited lexicon in the Croatian Kajkavian dialects]. Filologija (in Croatian) (64): 57–69.
- Lindstedt, Jouko; Salmela, Elina (2020). "Migrations and language shifts as components of the Slavic spread". In Tomáš Klír; Vít Boček; Nicolas Jansens (eds.). New Perspectives on the Early Slavs and the Rise of Slavic: Contact and Migrations (PDF). Heidelberg: Universitätsverlag Winter. pp. 275–300. ISBN 978-3-8253-4707-9.
- Loma, Aleksandar (1993). "Неки славистички аспекти српске етногенезе" [Some Linguistic Aspects of the Serb Ethnogenesis]. Zbornik Matice srpske za slavistiku (in Serbian). Novi Sad: 105–126.
- Loma, Aleksandar (2019). "Some linguistic observations on the ancient Slavs and their expansion". Балкан, Подунавље и Источна Европа у римско доба и у раном средњем веку [Balkans, the Danube Region and Eastern Europe in Roman era and in the early Middle Ages] (PDF) (in Russian and English). Museum of Vojvodina. pp. 29–45. ISBN 978-86-81086-15-5.
- Lončarić, Mijo (1995). "Prostiranje kajkavštine u prošlosti" [The borders of the Kajkavian dialect in the past]. Rasprave (in Croatian and English). 21 (1): 79–102.
- Lundberg, Grant H. (2013). Dialect Leveling in Haloze, Slovenia. Maribor: Mednarodna založba Oddelka za slovanske jezike in književnost, Filozofska fakultetar. ISBN 978-961-6930-11-6.
- Martindale, John R., ed. (1992). The Prosopography of the Later Roman Empire: Volume III, AD 527–641. Cambridge: Cambridge University Press. ISBN 0-521-20160-8.
- Matasović, Ranko (2008). Poredbenopovijesna gramatika hrvatskoga jezika [Comparative and historical grammar of Croatian] (in Croatian). Zagreb: Matica hrvatska. ISBN 978-953-150-840-7.
- Oblomsky, Andrei (2019). "Археолошка култура Сармата–Лимиганата, поглед с истока" [Archaeological culture of Sarmatians-Limigantes, view from the east]. Балкан, Подунавље и Источна Европа у римско доба и у раном средњем веку [Balkans, the Danube Region and Eastern Europe in Roman era and in the early Middle Ages] (PDF) (in Serbian and English). Museum of Vojvodina. pp. 407–441. ISBN 978-86-81086-15-5.
- Pavlovič, Daša (2015). "The beginning of Slavic settlement in north-eastern Slovenia and the relation between "Slavic" and "Lombard" settlement based on new interpretations of the archaeological material and radiocarbon dating". Fundberichte aus Österreich. Tagungsbände. 1: 59–72.
- Pleterski, Andrej (1990). Etnogeneza Slovanov: Obris trenutnega stanja arheoloških raziskav [Ethnogenesis of the Slavs: Outline of the current state of archaeological research] (in Slovenian). Ljubljana: Filozofska fakulteta, Oddelek za arheologijo.
- Pleterski, Andrej (2015). "Ранние славяне в Восточных Альпах и на соседних землях" [The Early Slavs in the Eastern Alps and Their Periphery]. Stratum Plus (in Russian) (5): 227–248.
- Pleterski, Andrej (2024). "Images behind the archaeological curtain: Vlachs, Slavs, župas, principalities, Carantania". Settlement of the Eastern Alps in the Early Middle Ages. Opera Instituti Artis Historiae. Vol. 48. Ljubljana: Založba ZRC. pp. 101–152. doi:10.3986/9789610508786_07. ISBN 978-961-05-0877-9.
- Popović, Ivan (1960). Geschichte der serbokroatischen Sprache [History of the Serbo-Croatian Language] (in German). Wiesbaden: Otto Harrassowitz.
- Procopius (1914). Henry Bronson Dewing (ed.). History of the Wars. William Heinemann Ltd.
- Radičević, Dejan (2015). "К изучению раннеславянских памятников Сербского Подунавья (вопросы хронологии и этнокультурной принадлежности)" [Towards the Study of the Early Slavic Sites of the Serbian Danube Region (Questions of Chronology and Ethnocultural Belonging)]. Stratum Plus (in Russian) (5): 285–308.
- Rončević, Dunja Brozović (1997). "Važnost hidronimije za proučavanje slavenske etnogeneze" [The importance of hydronymy in the study of Slavic ethnogenesis]. Filologija (in Croatian) (29): 1–24.
- Rončević, Dunja Brozović (1998). "Hrvatska hidronimija u slavenskom i tzv. staroeuropskom okružju" [Croatian hydronymy in the Slavic and "Old European" context]. Croatica (in Croatian). 27 (45–46): 35–55.
- Sarantis, Alexander (2009). "War and Diplomacy in Pannonia and the Northwest Balkans during the Reign of Justinian: The Gepid Threat and Imperial Responses". Dumbarton Oaks Papers. 63: 15–40. JSTOR 41219761.
- Sarantis, Alexander (2013). "Waging War in Late Antiquity; Military Encounters and Diplomatic Affairs in the North Balkans during the Reigns of Anastasius and Justinian". In Sarantis, Alexander; Christie, Neil (eds.). War and Warfare in Late Antiquity: Current Perspectives. Leiden, Boston: Brill. ISBN 978-90-04-25258-5.
- Schallert, Joseph; Greenberg, Marc L. (2007). "The Prehistory and Areal Distribution of Slavic *gъlčěti 'Speak'". Slovenski Jezik/Slovene Linguistic Studies (6): 9–76. doi:10.17161/SLS.1808.4398. hdl:1808/4398.
- Sedov, Valentin Vasilyevich (2013) [1995]. Славяне в раннем Средневековье [Sloveni u ranom srednjem veku (Slavs in Early Middle Ages)]. Novi Sad: Akademska knjiga. ISBN 978-86-6263-026-1.
- Stanciu, Ioan (2012). "About the Use of the so-called Clay "Breadcakes" in the Milieu of the Early Slav Settlements (6th – 7th Centuries)". Ephemeris Napocensis (22): 253–277.
- Stanciu, Ioan (2013). "The Problem of the Earliest Slavs in Intra-Carpathian Romania (Transylvania and the North-West Vicinity)". Slovenská Archeológia. 61 (2): 323–370.
- Stanciu, Ioan (2015). "Ранние славяне в румынской части Карпатского бассейна" [The Earliest Slavs in the Intra-Carpathian Region of Romania]. Stratum Plus (in Russian) (5): 163–216.
- Štular, Benjamin; Lozić, Edisa (2024). "Becoming Slav (Archaeological Evidence): Agricultural Anti-Revolution and Acculturation in the Eastern Alps". Settlement of the Eastern Alps in the Early Middle Ages. Ljubljana: Založba ZRC. pp. 85–100. doi:10.3986/9789610508786. ISBN 978-961-05-0877-9.
- Teodor, Dan G. (1984). "Origines et voies de pénétration des Slaves au sud du Bas-Danube (VIe-VIIe siècles)". Villes et peuplement dans l'Illyricum protobyzantin. Actes du colloque de Rome (12-14 mai 1982) (in French). Rome: Publications de l'École française de Rome. pp. 63–84. ISBN 2-7283-0067-4.
- Timberlake, Alan (2013). "Culture and the spread of Slavic". In Balthasar Bickel; Lenore A. Grenoble; David A. Peterson; Alan Timberlake (eds.). Language Typology and Historical Contingency: In honor of Johanna Nichols. Typological Studies in Language. Vol. 104. Amsterdam, Philadelphia: John Benjamins Publishing Company. pp. 331–356. doi:10.1075/tsl.104.15tim. ISBN 978-90-272-0685-5.
- Udolph, Jürgen (2016). "Expansion slavischer Stämme aus namenkundlicher und bodenkundlicher Sicht" [Expansion of the Slavic tribes from an onomastic and pedological point of view]. Onomastica (in German). 60 (60): 215–231. doi:10.17651/ONOMAST.60.15.
- Udolph, Jürgen (2021). "Eine neue bibliographische Sammlung zu europäischen Orts-, Flur- und Gewässernamen – Hinweise zur Benutzung" [A new bibliographical collection of European place, field and water names - instructions for use]. Onomastica (in German). 65 (65/1): 83–98. doi:10.17651/ONOMAST.65.1.4.
- Vedriš, Trpimir (2015). "Balkanske sklavinije i Bugarska – Hrvatska u međunarodnom kontekstu" [Balkan 'sklavinias' and Bulgaria – Croatia in the international context]. In Zrinka Nikolić Jakus (ed.). Nova zraka u europskom svjetlu: Hrvatske zemlje u ranome srednjem vijeku (oko 550 − oko 1150) [Croatian lands in the Early Middle Ages (o. 550. – o. 1150.)] (in Croatian). Zagreb: Matica hrvatska. pp. 581–608. ISBN 978-953-150-942-8.
- Vergunova, Ludmila (1996). The Geographic Distribution of Proto Slavic Dialectisms and the Genesis of the South Slavic Languages (PhD thesis). University of Michigan. hdl:2027.42/129821. OCLC 9624756.
- Vida, Tivadar (2021). "The process of the settlement of the Carpathian Basin by the Avars and their configuration of power". Von den Hunnen zu den Türken - Reiterkrieger in Europa und Zentralasien: Internationale Konferenz am Römisch-Germanischen Zentralmuseum - Leibniz Forschungsinstitut für Archäologie in Kooperation mit dem Institut für Mittelalterforschung der Österreichischen Akademie der Wissenschaften und dem Landesmuseum Halle: Mainz, 25.-26.April 2018. Halle: Tagungen des Landesmuseums für Vorgeschichte Halle. pp. 171–189. ISBN 978-3-948618-24-7.
- Yakushkina, Ekaterina (2020a). "Изоглоссы лексем праславянского происхождения в сербскохорватском ареале" [Isoglosses of lexemes of Proto-Slavic origin in the Serbian-Croatian areal]. Славяноведение (in Russian) (6). Russian Academy of Sciences: 98–110. doi:10.31857/S0869544X0012099-1.
- Yakushkina, Ekaterina (2020b). "Опыт реконструкции синонимических отношений в праславянской лексике на сербскохорватском диалектном материале: Реконструкција синонимских односа у прасловенској лексици на српскохрватској дијалекатској грађи" [The Reconstruction of Synonymous Relations in the Proto-Slavic Vocabulary Based on the Serbo-Croatian Dialect material]. Јужнословенски филолог/South Slavic Philologist (in Serbian). 76 (2). SANU: 27–46. doi:10.2298/JFI2002027Y.
- Yakushkina, Ekaterina (2020c). "Лексические изоглоссы хорватско-сербского пограничья" [Lexical isoglosses of the Croatian and Serbian borderland]. Исследования по славянской диалектологии (in Russian) (21–22). Institute of Slavic Studies of the Russian Academy of Sciences: 109–117. doi:10.31168/26188589.2020.2122.09 (inactive 12 July 2025).
- Yakushkina, Ekaterina (2020d). "К вопросу о лексических различиях староштокавских хорватских и новоштокавских сербских говоров" [About Lexical Differences between Old Shtokavian Croatian and New Shtokavian Serbian Dialects]. Nauchnyi Dialog (in Russian). 1 (8): 185–198. doi:10.24224/2227-1295-2020-8-185-198.
- Zečević, Emina (2019). "Трагови Словена у 6. и 7. столећу на западном Балкану" [Traces of Slavs in the 6th and 7th century in the Western Balkans]. Балкан, Подунавље и Источна Европа у римско доба и у раном средњем веку [Balkans, the Danube Region and Eastern Europe in Roman era and in the early Middle Ages] (in Serbian and English). Museum of Vojvodina. pp. 407–441. ISBN 978-86-81086-15-5.
- Živković, Tibor (2008). Forging unity: The South Slavs between East and West 550-1150. Belgrade: The Institute of History, Čigoja štampa. ISBN 978-86-7558-573-2.
