= Rhotacization =

Rhotacization may refer to:

- R-colored vowels
- Rhotacism (sound change), conversion of a consonant into an r sound
