= Carl Greenberg =

American journalist (1908–1984)

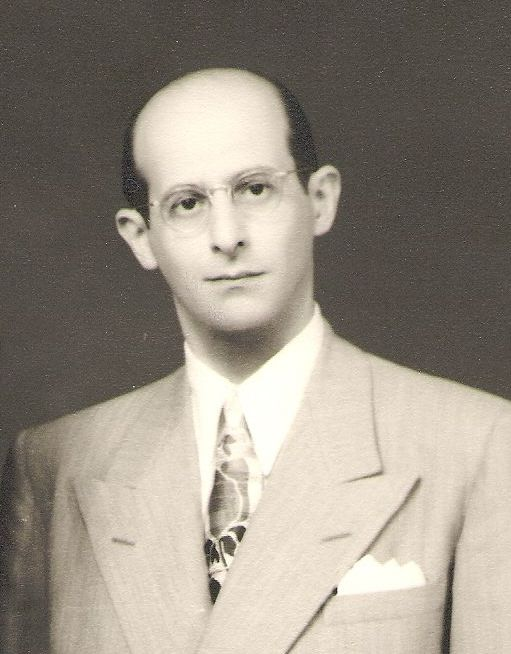
- Carl Greenberg, c. 1950
- Born: August 19, 1908; Boston, Massachusetts, U.S.
- Died: November 4, 1984 (aged 76); Los Angeles, California, U.S.
- Spouse: Gladys Bilansky
- Children: Howard A. Greenberg
- Relatives: Composer Yaacov Bilansky Levanon cousin (by marriage); Slavist Marc L. Greenberg, Phillip J. Greenberg, grandsons

Carl Greenberg (August 19, 1908 – November 4, 1984) was an American newspaper reporter who began as a police reporter; most of his career he was a reporter covering California and U.S. national politics. He worked for the Los Angeles Examiner until it closed in 1962; later he worked for the Los Angeles Times and became its political editor.

== Personal life ==
Greenberg's parents were Yiddish- and Russian-speaking Jewish immigrants from Novogradvolynsk, today in Ukraine, who had emigrated in the 1890s to Boston, where he was born. The family, including Greenberg's younger brother, Herbert, moved in the 1920s from Boston to Venice, California. Greenberg graduated from Los Angeles High School in 1926 and subsequently attended the University of California, Los Angeles. He married Gladys Bilansky July 12, 1930, and had a son, Howard, born in 1935. Coincidentally, Bilansky's father had also emigrated from Novogradvolynsk (today Zviahel). During World War II Carl served as a coxswain in the United States Coast Guard Reserve. He resided in Park La Brea during the late 1950s and early 1960s and in Culver City at the time of his retirement in 1973 until his death. He is entombed at Hillside Memorial Park Cemetery in Culver City.

== Professional life ==
Greenberg was a reporter for the Los Angeles Evening Express 1926–1928, the City News Service of Los Angeles 1928–1933, and for the Hearst paper, the Los Angeles Examiner 1933–1943, where he was promoted to political editor 1943–1962. After the Examiner folded he became a political writer for the Los Angeles Times from 1962 until his retirement in 1973; at the Times he also served as political editor 1966-1968 and as a member of the paper's editorial board from 1962 to 1968. He also served as disaster acting governor (in line of succession after the lieutenant governor) of California 1959–1967. He retired from his newspaper career at the Times in 1973. He received a number of awards for his reporting, including first prize for the best news story from the Southern California Newspaper Writers, Los Angeles chapter of Theta Sigma Phi in 1944; the Silver award from the California-Nevada Associated Press in 1957; and was a co-recipient of a Pulitzer Prize for general local reporting in 1966.

=== Ethical stance and legacy ===
In his early years covering Los Angeles politics, Greenberg was considered the Examiner's "political powerbroker inside Los Angeles City Hall." Greenberg was noted for his journalistic integrity as evidenced in a celebrated incident following Richard Nixon's failed bid for the California Governor's seat in 1962. In an attack on the press (during which he also famously remarked "You won't have Nixon to kick around any more"), Nixon accused the Los Angeles Times of bias against him but singled out Greenberg as "the only reporter on the Times that fits this thing, who wrote every word I said. He wrote it fairly. He wrote it objectively. Carl, despite whatever feelings he had, felt that he had an obligation to report the facts as he saw them," in response to which Greenberg proffered his resignation from the paper. His Times colleagues convinced him that he had no reason to resign.

In an article in Time his ethics were explained in terms of his background as a police reporter:

Why Nixon did not also disparage Carl Greenberg is perhaps partly explained by Greenberg's approach to political reporting. "He covers politics," says a colleague, "as if it were some sort of crime." Greenberg was, in fact, a police reporter before turning to political coverage, and on the precinct beat he learned a valuable lesson: that a police reporter, like a cop, has no business playing judge. He brought this conviction to the political scene, first for Hearst's Los Angeles Examiner and since 1961 for the Times. "I feel," says Greenberg, "that even if I hate a man, I have an honest responsibility to my readers to report what he said and did."

The incident continued to be discussed also as an example in the shift in political discourse in the US press in the 1960s. In a 2007 radio interview Tom Brokaw, discussing his book Boom!: Voices of the Sixties Personal Reflections on the '60s and Today, noted that "Carl was the one that Nixon singled out on that infamous news conference in which he said you won't have Dick Nixon to kick around anymore. And the only fair reporter, he said, was Carl. So you know, rhetoric did change. The politics didn't operate within the confines of smoke rooms anymore. You couldn't go to a few bosses and get the story. It was spread out across the landscape, and he was having a hard time keeping track of all that."
