= Marc L. Greenberg =

American linguist (born 1961)

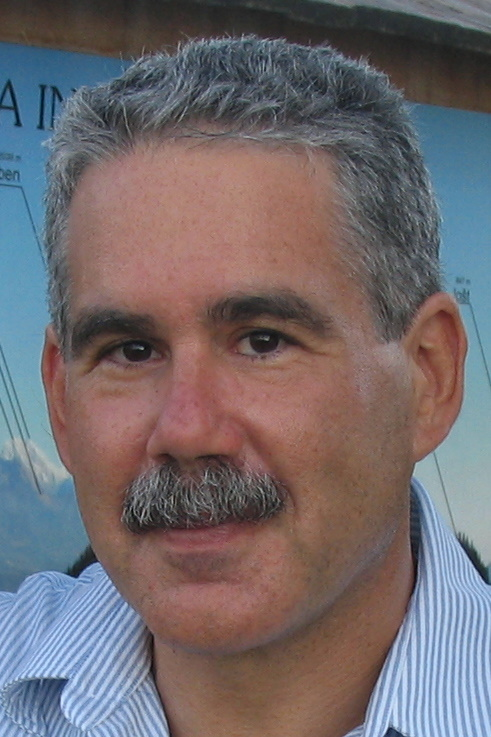
- Greenberg in 2007
- Born: November 9, 1961 (age 64); Hollywood, California, U.S.
- Known for: Contributions to the study of Slovene
- Spouse: Marta Pirnat (m. 1988)
- Children: 2

Academic background
- Education: University of California, Los Angeles (UCLA)
- Thesis: A Historical Analysis of the Phonology and Accentuation of the Prekmurje Dialect of Slovene (1990)
- Academic advisors: Henrik Birnbaum; Pavle Ivić; Ronelle Alexander; Alan Timberlake

Academic work
- Discipline: Slavic studies; historical linguistics; sociolinguistics
- Sub-discipline: Slovene dialectology
- Institutions: University of Kansas

Marc Leland Greenberg (born November 9, 1961) is an American linguist and Slavicist, best known for his contributions to Slovene, particularly the northeastern Prekmurje dialect. He has taught at the University of Kansas since 1990 and focuses primarily on historical linguistics and sociolinguistics. His 1990 dissertation on Prekmurje was later reformulated and expanded into a book, earning him a prize for "Best Book in Slavic Linguistics" from American Association of Teachers of Slavic and East European Languages (AATSEEL) in 2002.

Greenberg is a staunch advocate for foreign language learning in the United States, founding the University of Kansas's School of Languages, Literatures and Cultures in 2016 to promote that effort. He has established two academic journals and chaired the executive board of the Slavic Linguistics Society, during which he championed and promoted open access publication. In 2019, he was elected the first non-Slovene to be Ambassador of Science and Scholarship of the Republic of Slovenia. He has served as editor-in-chief of Brill's Encyclopedia of Slavic Languages and Linguistics since 2021.

== Early life and education ==
Marc Leland Greenberg was born on November 9, 1961, in the Hollywood neighborhood of Los Angeles, the son of a furniture store owner. The family has long-standing roots in the city; his grandfather was a news reporter covering the police in the 1920s. His great-grandparents, many of whom lived well into his adulthood, were from Russia, Ukraine, Romania, and Hungary, and spoke both Yiddish and the languages of their respective native countries.

Shortly after Greenberg's birth, the family moved to Whittier, California, where his brother Phillip was born in 1963. The family then moved to West Los Angeles five years later. Greenberg described the environment of Los Angeles as "an ahistorical, monocultural, future-oriented, materialistic culture of vanity and self-indulgence", and viewed linguistics as an opportunity to reinvent himself away from that upbringing. Unable to travel, he engaged his interest in languages through stamp collecting, remarking that the diversity of languages he found on the stamps helped to break up "monotonous Californian life". He and a neighborhood friend listened to foreign radio stations, and Greenberg used the more multicultural neighborhood of West Los Angeles to try and teach himself German and Russian.

Greenberg first received his bachelor's degree in Russian literature in 1983 from the University of California, Los Angeles (UCLA), graduating magna cum laude. There, he learned Russian, Czech, and Serbo-Croatian. He received his master's degree in comparative Slavic linguistics the following year from the University of Chicago and returned to UCLA to complete his doctorate, focusing on Slavic historical accentology and dialectology. He studied under Henrik Birnbaum, Pavle Ivić, Ronelle Alexander, and Alan Timberlake. Ivić directed Greenberg to the work of the Dutch linguist Willem Vermeer, who had done substantial dialectology work in Yugoslavia, and Vermeer began mentoring Greenberg on his linguistic fieldwork in Slovene.

During the 1980s, Greenberg traveled across Eastern Europe, studying in Communist Russia, Czechoslovakia, and Hungary. His first trip, in 1982, was to Leningrad State University. The following year, he visited Charles University where he met his future wife Marta, a Slovene. After he was given a Fulbright fellowship in 1987, Greenberg traveled to Amsterdam, staying with Vermeer shortly before moving on to Yugoslavia. Greenberg later described the stay as "formative", believing he "had found his tribe" when Vermeer informed him that historical-comparative dialectologists were "the lunatic fringe" of Slavistics. With an additional grant from the United States Department of Education, Greenberg completed fieldwork for his dissertation in Yugoslavia between 1988 and 1990. His thesis, A Historical Analysis of the Phonology and Accentuation of the Prekmurje Dialect of Slovene, earned him his doctorate in 1990. When Slovenia declared its independence, Greenberg advocated for its recognition in the United States.

== Career ==
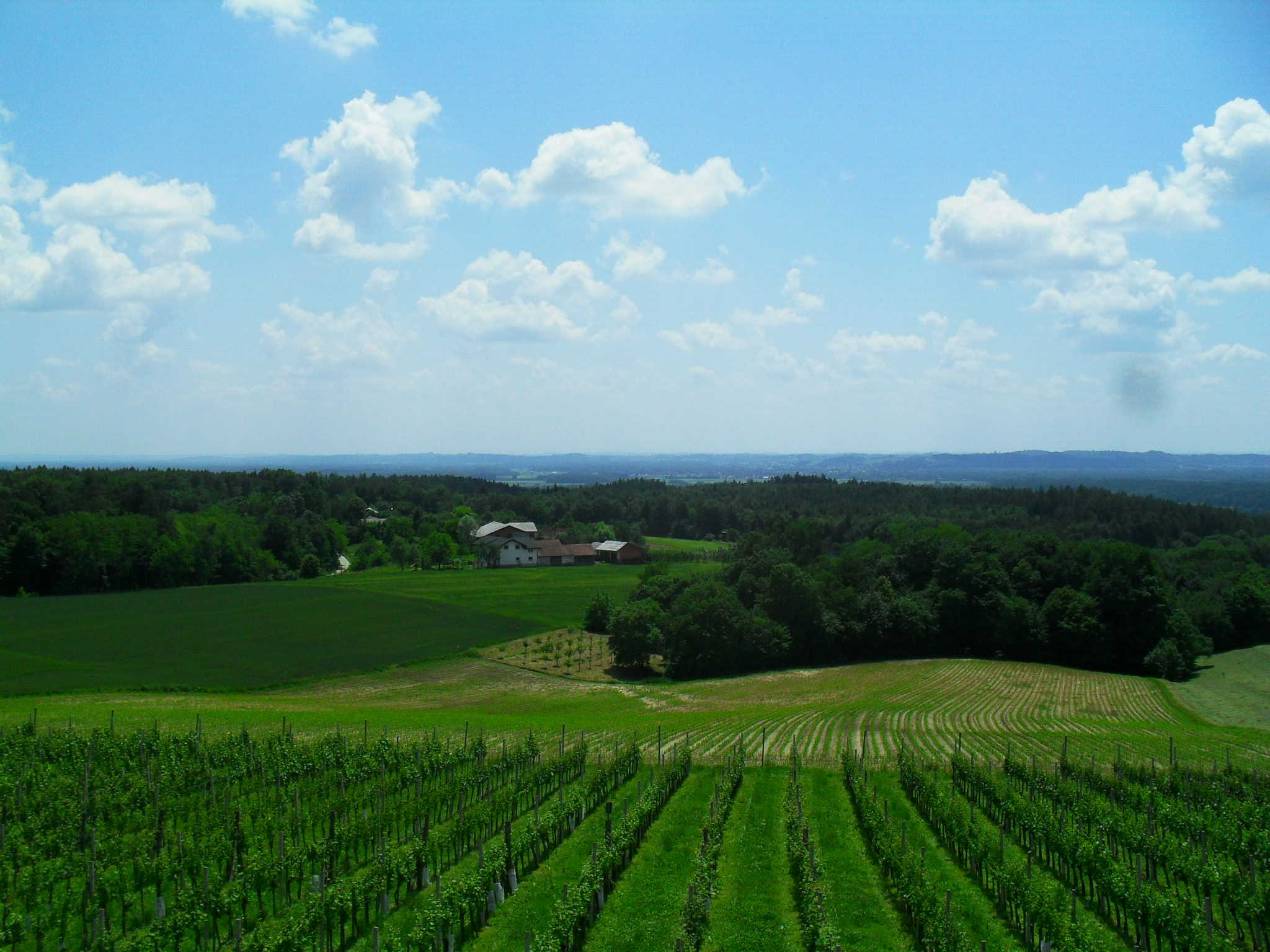
Greenberg's linguistic interest has focused largely on the Prekmurje region of Slovenia.

Greenberg has been a professor at the University of Kansas's Department of Slavic Languages and Literatures since 1990, serving as its chair from 2000 until 2011. Following an expansion and revision, his dissertation was published as a book in 2000 as A Historical Phonology of the Slovene Language. The book was recognized as the "Best Book in Slavic Linguistics" by the American Association of Teachers of Slavic and East European Languages (AATSEEL) in 2002 and a Slovene translation was published the same year. Greenberg later joked that the award finally justified "the seven-year-long torture" of producing it. He attained full professorship in 2001. Greenberg mainly teaches historical linguistics and sociolinguistics.

Aside from his regular linguistic work, Greenberg co-founded the academic journals Slavia Centralis, which he named and served as its first linguistics editor, and Slovenski jezik/Slovene Linguistic Studies, co-founded with Marko Snoj. Greenberg has also chaired the executive board of the Slavic Linguistics Society. His leadership in both his journals and chairmanship has focused largely on the accessibility of science by promoting the use of open access among publications. Greenberg was a founder of the School of Languages, Literatures and Cultures at the University of Kansas in 2016 and serves as its director. The school promotes the instruction of foreign languages across the United States, for which Greenberg has long been a vocal advocate. Greenberg began doing editorial work for Brill's Encyclopedia of Slavic Languages and Linguistics in 2016, and has been its editor-in-chief since 2021. Feeling that his later career has been "preoccupied by administrative duties", he has opined that the encyclopedia has allowed him to reengage with current scholarship.

In 2021, Greenberg published a translation and expansion of Avgust Pavel's Hungarian-language book Vend nyelvtan, a 1942 grammar of the Prekmurje dialect of Slovene. Though the manuscript was more-or-less complete by 2005, it remained unpublished and a Slovene translation was published in 2013. Greenberg remarked that the Slovene translation "came in very handy" because he was working off of a shoddy photocopy of the original and the Slovene translation helped him to adjust linguistic nuance he had been uncertain about. In an interview for the Slovene magazine Porabje, Greenberg expressed that he considers Prekmurje to be both a language and a dialect of Slovene, arguing that it is a Slovene language rather than a part of the Slovene language. He calls this unique, remarking that it is "a phenomenon of its own".

== Recognition ==
In 2017, Greenberg was elected a corresponding member of the Slovenian Academy of Sciences and Arts. For his contributions, he was honored with a Festschrift entitled V zeleni drželi zeleni breg ('In a Green Country, A Green Hill'), a pun on his surname, (Note: Zeleni breg is a rough Slovene translation of Greenberg.) in 2018. The following year, he was made the ambassador of science and scholarship of the Republic of Slovenia, its first non-Slovene member ever elected to the position.

== Personal life ==
Greenberg is married to Marta (née Pirnat), who teaches Slovene at the University of Kansas. The two met in Czechoslovakia in 1983. Though they originally communicated in Czech, she sent him a Slovene–English dictionary after they were engaged and began writing him letters in Slovene; he remarked of the change: "If I wanted to figure out how much she loved me, I had to figure out what was written in her letters." The two married during Greenberg's Fulbright scholarship in Yugoslavia, with their first child, Benjamin, born in Ljubljana in 1989. Greenberg has two children, both of whom speak Slovene fluently.

In addition to Slovene, Greenberg speaks Croatian, Czech, and Russian fluently, all of which he learned before he learned Slovene. He is able to read and engage in limited conversation in Albanian, German, French, Italian, Turkish, and Yiddish. Greenberg is also an accomplished multi-instrumental musician, playing classical guitar, Russian guitar, and the lute in shows across the United States and Europe.

== Selected works ==
- Greenberg, Marc L. (1987). "Prozodične možnosti v slovenskem knjižnem jeziku in slovenskih narečjih" [Prosodic possibilities in the Slovenian literary language and Slovenian dialects]. Slavistična revija [Journal of Slavistics] (in Slovenian). 35 (2). Translated by Pirnat-Greenberg, Marta. Slavistično društvo Slovenije [Slavistics Society of Slovenia]: 168–186. hdl:1808/12501.
- —— (2000). A Historical Phonology of the Slovene Language. Heidelberg: C. Winter Universitätsverlag. ISBN 978-3-8253-1097-4.
- —— (2001). "Расцвет и падение лениции взрывных в словенском языке" [The Rise and Fall of Lenition in Slovene]. Вопросы языкознания [Questions of Linguistics] (in Russian). 1. Russian Academy of Sciences: 31–42. hdl:1808/5607.
- —— (2002). "Common Slavic: Progress or Crisis in its Reconstruction? Notes on Recent Archaeological Challenges to Historical Linguistics". International Journal of Slavic Linguistics and Poetics. 44–45. Slavica: 197–209. hdl:1808/5616.
- —— (2003). "On the possible Uralic source for the gen. sg. ā-stem desinence in Slavic". Материялы Международной научной коференции, посвященной 70-летию профессора И. С. Галкина [Materials of the International Scientific Conferences: In Honor of the 70th Birthday of I. S. Galkina]. Актуальные проблемы финно-угорской филологии [Current Problems in Finno-Urgric Philology]. Yoshkar-Ola, Russia: Mari State University. pp. 44–50. hdl:1808/760. ISBN 978-953-6637-36-2.
- —— (2006). A Short Reference Grammar of Slovene. Chapel Hill: Duke University and University of North Carolina at Chapel Hill. hdl:1808/5469.
- —— (2007). "Phonetic evidence for the development of the 'acute' tone in Slavic". In Kapović, Mate; Matasović, Ranko (eds.). Tones and Theories. International Workshop on Balto-Slavic Accentology. Zagreb: Institut za hrvatski jezik i jezikoslovlje [Institute for the Croatian Language and Linguistics]. pp. 75–87. ISBN 978-953-6637-36-2.
- —— (2010). "PIE inheritance and word-formational innovation in Slavic motion verbs in -i-". In Driagina-Hasko, Viktoria; Perelmutter, Renee (eds.). New Approaches to Slavic Verbs of Motion. Amsterdam: John Benjamins. pp. 111–142. doi:10.1075/slcs.115. hdl:1808/10879. ISBN 9789027288639.
- —— (2011). "'The American Model': English Only or Engagement with a Multi-Polar World?". Uporabno jezikoslovje [Useful Linguistics]. 9 (10). Inštitut za narodnostna vprašanja [Institute for Ethnic Studies]: 230–237. hdl:1808/9651.
- —— (2019) [2016]. V zanosu in obupu: Oblikovanje doslej največjega priročnika o slovanskih jezikih in jezikoslovju [The Agony and the Ecstasy: Shaping the Largest Reference Work of Slavic Languages and Linguistics to Date] (Speech). Inaugural lecture of corresponding member Greenberg at the Slovenian Academy of Sciences and Arts (in Slovenian). Ljubljana: University of Kansas.
- —— (2020). "Slovene Linguistics from Across the Pond: A Transatlantic View". In Simoniti, Veronika (ed.). A kot America [A as America] (in English and Slovenian). Ljubljana: Slovenian Academy of Sciences and Arts. pp. 137–142. ISBN 978-961-268-066-4.
