= Rhotacism =

Sound change converting an alveolar consonant to a rhotic consonant

Rhotacism (/ˈroʊtəsɪzəm/ ROH-tə-siz-əm) or rhotacization is a sound change that converts one consonant (usually a voiced alveolar consonant: /z/, /d/, /l/, or /n/) to a rhotic consonant in a certain environment. The most common may be of /z/ to /r/. When a dialect or member of a language family resists the change and keeps a /z/ sound, this is sometimes known as zetacism.

The term comes from the Greek letter rho, denoting /r/.

== Albanian ==
The southern (Tosk) dialects, the base of Standard Albanian, changed /n/ to /r/, but the northern (Gheg) dialects did not:

- zëri vs. zâni 'the voice'
- gjuri vs. gjuni 'the knee'
- Shqipëria vs. Shqypnia 'Albania'
- Arbëria vs. Arbënia 'Albania' (older name of the country)
- i djegur vs. i djegun 'burnt'
- druri vs. druni 'wood'
- bëra vs. bona 'did'
- zura vs. zuna 'caught'
- pluhur vs. pluhun 'dust'
- dashuri vs. dashni 'love'

== Aramaic ==
In Aramaic, Proto-Semitic n changed to r in a few words:

- bar "son" as compared to Hebrew בֵן ben (from Proto-Semitic *bnu)
- trên and tartên "two" (masculine and feminine form respectively) as compared to South Levantine Arabic تنين tnēn and تنتين tintēn, from Proto-Semitic *ṯnaimi and *ṯnataimi. Compare also Aramaic tinyânâ "the second one", without the shift.

== Basque ==
Aquitanian *l changed to the tapped r between vowels in Basque. It can be observed in words borrowed from Latin; for example, Latin caelum (meaning "sky, heaven") became zeru in Basque (caelum > celu > zeru; compare cielo in Spanish). The original l is preserved in the Souletin dialect: caelum > celu > zelü.

== Finnish ==
Western dialects of Finnish are characterised by the pronunciation /r/ or /ɾ/ of the consonant written d in Standard Finnish kahden kesken- kahren kesken (two together = one on one). The reconstructed older pronunciation is *ð.

== Goidelic languages ==
In Manx, Scottish Gaelic and some dialects of Irish, /n/ becomes /r/ in a variety of consonant clusters, often with nasalization of the following vowel. For example, the /kn/ cluster developed into /kr/, as in Scottish Gaelic cnoc [krɔ̃xk] ‘hill’. Within Ireland, this phenomenon is most prevalent in northern dialects and absent from the most southern dialects. Some examples of rhotacized clusters include /kn/ (cnó), /mn/ (mná), /ɡn/ (gnó), and /tn/ (tnáith), while /sn/ (snámh) is never rhotacized even in the most innovative dialects. This can lead to interesting pairs such as nominative an sneachta /ə ˈʃnʲæːxt̪ˠə/ versus genitive an tsneachta /ə ˈt̪ɾʲæːxt̪ˠə/.

== Germanic languages ==
All surviving Germanic languages, which are members of the North and West Germanic families, changed /z/ to /r/, implying a more approximant-like rhotic consonant in Proto-Germanic. As attested by runes, the shift affected Old Norse later than the Continental Germanic languages. Some languages later changed all forms to r, but Gothic, an extinct East Germanic language, did not undergo rhotacism.

Proto-Germanic	Gothic	Old Norse	(Old English) Modern English	Old Frisian	Dutch	(Old High German) Modern German
*was,^{1st/3rd sg} *wēzum^{1st pl}	was, wēsum	var, várum	(wæs, wǣron) was, were	was, wēren	was, waren	(was, wārum) war, waren
*fraleusaną,^{inf} *fraluzanaz^{p.part.}	fraliusan, fralusans	—	(forlēosan, forloren) forlese, forlorn	urliāsa, urlāren	verliezen, verloren	(farliosan, farloren) verlieren, verloren

Note that the Modern German forms have levelled the rhotic consonant to forms that did not originally have it. However, the original sound can still be seen in some nouns such as Wesen, "being" (from the same root as war/waren) as well as Verlust, "loss" and Verlies, "dungeon" (both from the same root as verlieren/verloren).

Because of the presence of words that did not undergo rhotacism from the same root as those that did, the result of the process remains visible in a few modern English word pairs:

- is and are (PGmc. *isti vs *izi)
- was and were (PGmc. *was vs *wēz-)
- the comparative and superlative suffixes -er and -est (PGmc. *-izô vs *-istaz) and derived words such as more and most (*maizô vs *maistaz), better and best (*batizô vs *batistaz), etc
- rise and rear (as in 'to bring up'; PGmc. *rīsaną vs *raizijaną)
- loss and forlorn (PGmc. *lusą vs *fraluzanaz)
- frozen and archaic frorn (from OE (ġe)froren, from PGmc. *fruzanaz)

=== English ===
Intervocalic /t/ and /d/ are commonly lenited to [ɾ] in most accents of North American and Australian English and some accents of Irish English and English English, a process known as tapping or less accurately as flapping: got a lot of /ˈɡɒtə ˈlɒtə/ becomes [ˈɡɒɾə ˈlɒɾə]. Contrast is usually maintained with /r/, and the [ɾ] sound is rarely perceived as /r/.

=== German ===
In Central German dialects, especially Rhine Franconian and Hessian, /d/ is frequently realised as [ɾ] in intervocalic position. The change also occurs in Mecklenburg dialects. Compare Borrem (Central Hessian) and Boden (Standard German).

== Romance languages and Latin ==
=== Latin ===
Reflecting a highly-regular change in pre-Classical Latin, intervocalic /s/ in Old Latin, which is assumed to have been pronounced [z], invariably became r, resulting in pairs such as these:

- flōs^{nom} — flōrem^{acc} (Old Latin flōsem)
- genus^{nom} — generis^{gen} (from *geneses, cf. Sanskrit janasas)
- rōbus, rōbustus — rōbur, corrōborāre (verb from *conrobosare)
- jūstus — de jūre (from de jouse)
- est — erō (from esō)
- gessī, gestō — gerō (from gesō)

Intervocalic s in Classical Latin suggests either borrowing (rosa) or reduction of an earlier ss after a long vowel or a diphthong (pausa < paussa, vīsum < *vīssum < *weid-tom). The s was preserved initially (septum) and finally and in consonant clusters.

Old Latin honos became honor in Late Latin by analogy with the rhotacised forms in other cases such as genitive, dative and accusative honoris, honori, honorem.

Another form of rhotacism in Latin was dissimilation of d to r before another d and dissimilation of l to r before another l, resulting in pairs such as these:

- medius — merīdiēs (instead of *medi-diēs)
- caelum — caeruleus (instead of *cael-uleus)

The phenomenon was noted by the Romans themselves:

In many words in which the ancients said s, they later said r... foedesum foederum, plusima plurima, meliosem meliorem, asenam arenam

— Varro, De lingua Latina, VII, 26, In multis verbis, in quo antiqui dicebant s, postea dicunt r... foedesum foederum, plusima plurima, meliosem meliorem, asenam arenam

=== Neapolitan ===
In Neapolitan, rhotacism affects words that etymologically contained singleton intervocalic or initial /d/, but also /l/ when followed by some other consonant.

- LAT. DECE(S) > Neap. riece [ˈrjeːtʃə] "ten"
- LAT. PEDE(M) > Neap. pere [ˈpɛːrə] "foot"
- LAT. POL(Y)PU(M) > Neap. purpo [ˈpurpə] "octopus"

=== Portuguese and Galician ===
In Galician-Portuguese, rhotacism occurred from /l/ to /r/, mainly in consonant clusters ending in /l/ such as in the words obrigado, "thank you" (originally "obliged"), praia, "beach"; prato, "plate" or "dish", branco, "white", prazer/pracer, "pleasure", praça/praza, "square" from Latin obligatus, plagia, platus, blancus (Germanic origin), placere (verb), platea. Compare Spanish obligado (obliged), playa, plato, blanco, placer, plaza.

In contemporary Brazilian Portuguese, rhotacism of /l/ in the syllable coda is characteristic of the Caipira dialect. Further rhotacism in the nationwide vernacular includes planta, "plant", as [ˈpɾɐ̃tɐ], lava, "lava", as /ˈlarvɐ/ (then homophonous with larva, worm/maggot), lagarto, "lizard", as [laʁˈɡaʁtu] (in dialects with guttural coda r instead of a tap) and advogado, "lawyer", as [ɐ̞de̞vo̞ʁˈɡadu]. The nonstandard patterns are largely marginalised, and rhotacism is regarded as a sign of speech-language pathology or illiteracy.

=== Romanesco Italian ===
Rhotacism, in Romanesco, shifts l to r before a consonant, like certain Andalusian dialects of Spanish. Thus, Latin altus (tall) is alto in Italian but becomes arto in Romanesco. Rhotacism used to happen when l was preceded by a consonant, as in the word ingrese (English), but modern speech has lost that characteristic.

Another change related to r was the shortening of the geminated rr, which is not rhotacism. Italian errore, guerra and marrone "error", "war", "brown" become erore, guera and marone.

=== Romanian ===
In Romanian, rhotacism shifted intervocalic l to r and n to r.

Thus, Latin caelum ‘sky; heaven’ became Romanian cer, Latin fenestra ‘window’ Romanian fereastră and Latin felicitas ‘happiness’ Romanian fericire.

Some northern Romanian dialects and Istro-Romanian also changed all intervocalic [n] to [ɾ] in words of Latin origin. For example, Latin bonus became Istro-Romanian bur: compare to standard Daco-Romanian bun.

=== Sicilian ===
The phenomenon does not appear to be systemic in Sicilian, as rhotacism is particularly widespread on the island of Sicily and in Cilento, but it is almost completely absent throughout Calabria and in Salento. It affects singleton intervocalic and initial /d/ which is realized as a single flap: peri [ˈpɛːɾɪ] from Latin pedem, reci [ˈɾɛːʃɪ] from Latin deces. Yet it also acts upon /l/ when followed by some other consonant: urmu from Latin ulmum.

=== Spanish ===
In Andalusian Spanish, particularly in Seville, at the end of a syllable before another consonant, l is replaced with r: Huerva for Huelva. The reverse occurs in Caribbean Spanish: Puelto Rico for Puerto Rico (lambdacism).

=== Other languages ===
Rhotacism (mola > mora, filum > fir, sal > sare) exists in some Gallo-Italic languages as well: Lombard (Western and Alpine) and Ligurian.

In Umbrian but not Oscan, rhotacism of intervocalic s occurred as in Latin.

== Turkic ==
Among the Turkic languages, the Oghur branch exhibits /r/, opposing to the rest of Turkic, which exhibits /z/. In this case, rhotacism refers to the development of *-/r/, *-/z/, and *-/d/ to /r/, *-/k/, *-/kh/ in this branch.

== South Slavic languages ==
(This section relies on the treatment in Greenberg 1999.)

In some South Slavic languages, rhotacism occasionally changes a voiced palatal fricative [ʒ] to a dental or alveolar tap or trill [r] between vowels:

- moreš (Slovene, most of Croatian dialects) 'you can' from earlier možešь
- kdor (Slovene) from earlier *kъto-že

The beginning of the change is attested in the Freising manuscripts from the 10th century AD, which show both the archaism (ise 'which' < *jь-že) and the innovation (tere 'also' < *te-že). The shift is also found in individual lexical items in Bulgarian dialects, дорде 'until' (< *do-že-dĕ) and Macedonian, сеѓере (archaic: 'always' <*vьsegъda-že). However, the results of the sound change have largely been reversed by lexical replacement in dialects in Serbia from the 14th century.

Dialects in Croatia and Slovenia have preserved more of the lexical items with the change and have even extended grammatical markers in -r from many sources that formally merged with the rhotic forms that arose from the sound change: Slovene dialect nocor 'tonight' (< *not'ь-sь-ǫ- + -r-) on the model of večer 'evening' (< *večerъ). The reversal of the change is evident in dialects in Serbia in which the -r- formant is systematically removed: Serbian veče 'evening'.

== Bibliography ==
- Catford, J.C. (2001), "On Rs, rhotacism and paleophony", Journal of the International Phonetic Association, 31 (2): 171–185, doi:10.1017/S0025100301002018, S2CID 143611805
- Crowley, Terry (1997). An Introduction to Historical Linguistics (3rd ed.). Oxford University Press. ISBN 9780195583786.
- Greenberg, Marc L. (1999), "Multiple Causation in the Spread and Reversal of a Sound Change: Rhotacism in South Slavic", Slovenski Jezik/Slovene Linguistics Studies, 2: 63–76, doi:10.3986/SLS.2.1.04
- Nandris, O (1963), Phonétique Historique du Roumain, Paris: Klincksiek
