= Zbigniew Gołąb =

Polish-American linguist and Slavist

- Born: 16 March 1923; Nowy Targ, Poland
- Died: 24 March 1994 (aged 71); Chicago, Illinois, U.S.
- Education: University of Wrocław (M.A.); Jagiellonian University (Ph.D.)
- Occupations: Linguist; Slavist

Zbigniew Gołąb (16 March 1923, in Nowy Targ – 24 March 1994, in Chicago) was a Polish-American linguist and Slavist. He was described as "one of the world's greatest experts on the Macedonian language and the leading expert on Macedonian–Arumanian contact."

He was active during the World War II Resistance Movement, after which he joined the guerrilla war against the Germans in 1944. He was imprisoned that same year, but managed to escape prior to the liberation of Kraków by the Red Army. In 1948–49 he was imprisoned for one year by the communist authorities, but was eventually released.

He received his M.A. from the University of Wrocław in 1947 and his Ph.D. at the Jagiellonian University in 1958. He served as a professor at the John Paul II Catholic University of Lublin during 1952–1961, and also at the Slavic Institute of the Polish Academy of Learning (1955–1961). Afterward he emigrated to the United States where he taught Slavic languages at the University of Chicago from 1962 until his retirement in 1993 as professor emeritus.

He was elected as a member of the Macedonian Academy of Sciences and Arts in 1972.

His research includes a study of the Macedonian dialects of Suho and Visoka (published in Makedonski jazik), his habilitation on Balkan conditionals (Cracow, 1964), a monograph on the Arumanian dialect of Krushevo (1984), and his last book: The Origins of the Slavs: A Linguist's View (Columbus, 1992). He also co-edited a dictionary of linguistic terminology (Warsaw, 1968) and was the author of more than 70 articles and reviews.
