= Henrik Birnbaum =

German-born American linguist (1925–2002)

- Born: December 13, 1925; Breslau, Weimar Republic (now Wrocław, Poland)
- Died: April 30, 2002 (aged 76); Los Angeles, California, U.S.

Henrik Maximilian Birnbaum (December 13, 1925 – April 30, 2002) was a German-born American linguist, Slavist, and historian.

== Education and work ==
Birnbaum was born in Breslau, today's Wrocław, Poland. He received his PhD in Slavic Philology in 1954. He worked as a docent at the Stockholm University in 1958-1961, as an Associate Professor of Slavic languages and literature at the University of California at Los Angeles (UCLA), and as a tenured professor at the same university in 1964-1994. He was a guest professor at many American and European universities. From 1992 he led the Department of Medieval Studies at Central European University in Budapest.

He authored more than 300 scientific publications in the fields of phonology, dialectology, comparative grammar of Slavic languages, history and culture of the Slavs, 18 of which are books and monographs. Since 1992 he was a regular member of the American Academy of Arts and Sciences, since 1981 a corresponding member of the Swedish Academy, since 1986 a corresponding member of the Yugoslav Academy of Sciences and Arts, and since 1988 a corresponding member of the Polish Academy of Sciences.

== Works ==
- Untersuchungen zu den Zukunftsumschreibungen mit dem Infinitiv im Altkirchenslavischen. Ein Beitrag zur historischen Verbalsyntax des Slavischen, Stockholm, 1958.
- Slaverna och deras grannfolk. En kort orientering [The Slavs and Their Neighbors. A Short Orientation], Uppsala, 1961.
- Studies on Predication in Russian I, Santa Monica, CA, 1964.
- Studies on Predication in Russian II, Santa Monica, CA, 1965.
- Problems of Typological and Genetic Linguistics Viewed in a Generative Framework, The Hague, 1970.
- On Medieval and Renaissance Slavic Writing. Selected Essays, The Hague, 1974.
- Common Slavic: Progress and Problems in its Reconstruction, Cambridge, MA, 1975, ²1979.
  - Russian translation by Vladimir Dybo: Праславянский язык. Достижения и проблемы в его реконструкции, Moscow, 1987.
- Doktor Faustus und Doktor Schiwago. Versuch über zwei Zeitromane aus Exilsicht, Lisse, 1976.
- Linguistic Reconstruction: Its Potentials and Limitations in a New Perspective, Washington, D.C., 1977.
- Lord Novgorod the Great: Essays in the History and Culture of a Medieval City-State. Part One: The Historical Background, Columbus, OH, 1981.
- Essays in Early Slavic Civilization / Studien zur Frühkultur der Slaven, Munich, 1981.
- Recent Advances in the Reconstruction of Common Slavic (1971-1982) [jointly with P.T. Merrill], Columbus, OH, 1984.
- Lord Novgorod the Great: Sociopolitical Experiment and Cultural Achievement, Los Angeles, 1985.
- Novgorod and Dubrovnik: Two Slavic City Republics and Their Civilization, Zagreb, 1989.
- Aspects of the Slavic Middle Ages and Slavic Renaissance Culture, New York, 1992.
- Novgorod in Focus, Columbus, OH, 1996.
- Sketches of Slavic Scholars, Bloomington, IN, 1998.
