= Alan Timberlake =

American linguist

Alan Timberlake (born in 1946) is an American linguist, a professor in the Department of Slavic Languages and Literatures at Columbia University and the director of the East Central European Center.

== Education ==
Alan Timberlake received a Ph.D from Harvard University in 1973.

== Academic career ==
Alan Timberlake taught for 14 years at UCLA, then for 21 years at the University of California at Berkeley. In 2008, he came to Columbia University. He served as chair at these three universities for 12 years in total. He also has taught courses in philology at Stanford as a visitor.

His work A Reference Grammar of Russian won the 2006 AATSEEL Best Book in Slavic Linguistics award.

== Research interest ==
The focus of Timberlake's research is language. At Columbia University, he teaches courses on Slavic cultures and Russian linguistics. Apart from that, he teaches several courses a year in general linguistics, including recently “Language and Society”, which included a discussion of language allegiance among diasporic communities in America.

Timberlake speaks Czech and Russian and reads other Slavic languages and Lithuanian.

== Selected works ==
=== Books ===
- Timberlake, Alan (2004). A reference grammar of Russian. Cambridge, U.K.: Cambridge University Press. ISBN 0-511-16559-5. OCLC 69401290.

=== Articles ===
- Timberlake, Alan (1975). "Hierarchies in the Genitive of Negation". The Slavic and East European Journal. 19 (2): 123–138. doi:10.2307/306765. JSTOR 306765.
- Timberlake, Alan. 1993. Isochrony in Late Common Slavic. In Robert A. Maquire and Alan Timberlake (eds.), American Contributions to the Eleventh International Congress of Slavists. Literature. Linguistics. Poetics. Columbus, OH: Slavica.
- Timberlake, Alan. 1993. Russian. In Bernard Comrie and Greville Corbett (eds.), The Slavonic Languages, London-New York: Routledge.
- Timberlake, Alan (1995). "Avvakum's Aorists". Russian Linguistics. 19 (1): 25–43. doi:10.1007/BF01649620. ISSN 0304-3487. JSTOR 40160417. S2CID 170172347.
- Timberlake, Alan. 2000. "Older and Younger Recensions of the First Novgorod Chronicle", Oxford Slavonic Papers, 33:135.
- Timberlake, Alan (2013). "Culture and the spread of Slavic". In Balthasar Bickel, Lenore A. Grenoble, David A. Peterson, Alan Timberlake (ed.). Language Typology and Historical Contingency: In honor of Johanna Nichols. Typological Studies in Language. Vol. 104. Amsterdam, Philadelphia: John Benjamins Publishing Company. pp. 331–356. doi:10.1075/tsl.104.15tim. ISBN 9789027206855.
- Timberlake, Alan (2017). "Slavic Languages". The Cambridge Handbook of Areal Linguistics. Cambridge University Press. pp. 343–348. doi:10.1017/9781107279872.013. ISBN 9781107279872.

=== Festschrift ===
Vladislava Warditz (ed.): Russian Grammar: System – Usus – Variation (= Linguistica Philologica 1), Peter Lang Verlag, Berlin et al. 2021.

The present volume contains a selection of papers presented at the Fifth International Symposium on Russian Grammar: System–Usus–Language Variation, which took place from September 22 to 24, 2021, at the University of Potsdam (Potsdam, Germany). This collection of essays is dedicated to Alan Timberlake, on the occasion of his 75th birthday.
