= Early Slavs =

Group of tribal societies

Slověne
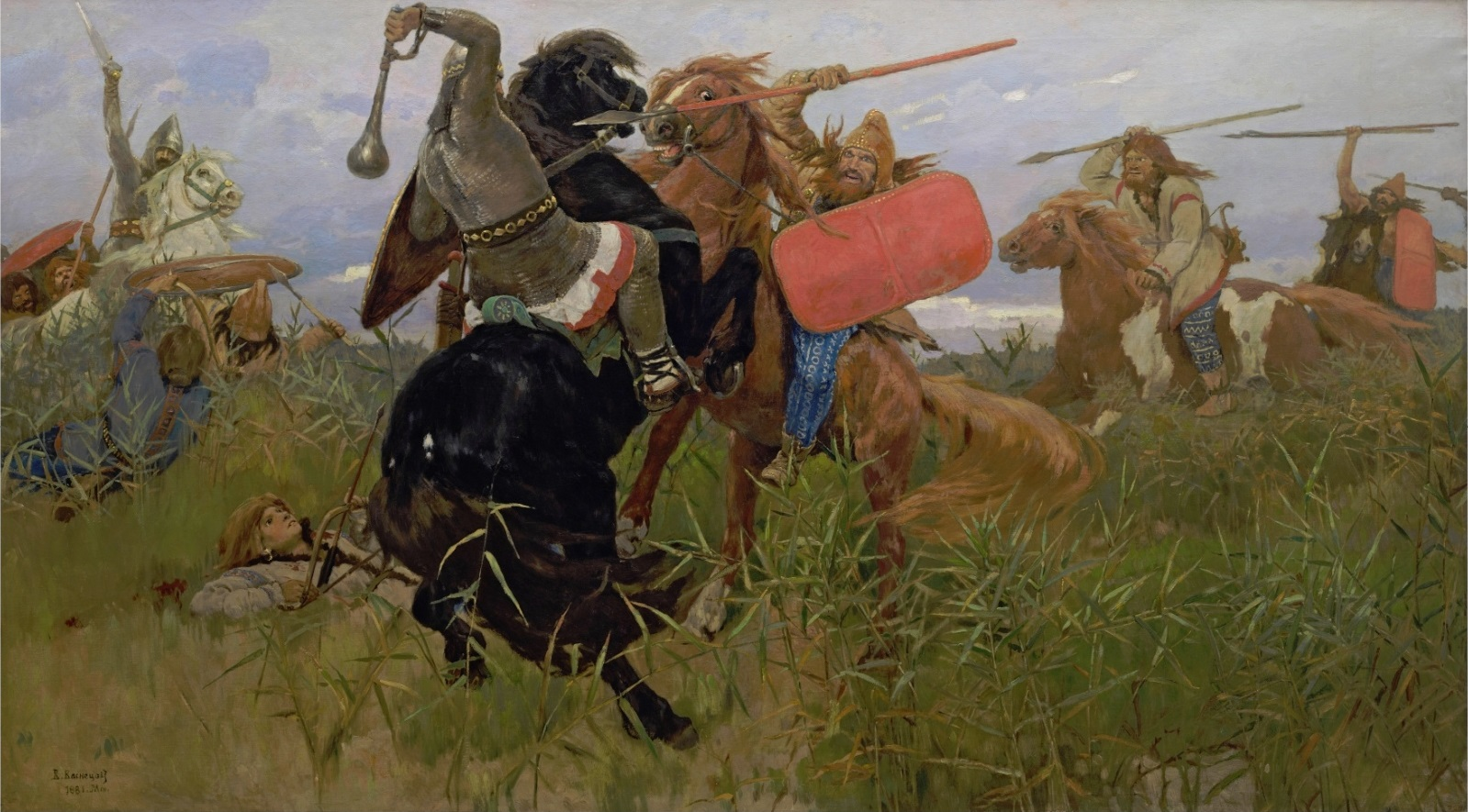
- ''Battle between the Slavs and the Scythians — painting by Viktor Vasnetsov (1881)

Total population
- Unknown

Regions with significant populations
- Central, Eastern and Southeastern Europe

Languages
- Proto-Slavic

Religion
- Slavic paganism (until the 7th century), later Christianity

Related ethnic groups
- Balts, Indo-Europeans, West Slavs, East Slavs, South Slavs

The early Slavs were Indo-European peoples and speakers of the Indo-European dialects who lived during the Migration Period and the Early Middle Ages (approximately from the 5th to the 10th centuries AD) in Central, Eastern and Southeast Europe and established the foundations for the Slavic nations through the Slavic states of the Early and High Middle Ages. The Slavs' original homeland is still a matter of debate due to a lack of historical records, but scholars generally place it in Eastern Europe, with Polesia being the most commonly accepted location.

It is generally agreed that ancient Roman writers referred to the ancestors of Slavs as Venedi. The proto-Slavic term Slav shares roots with Slavic terms for speech, word, and perhaps was used by early Slavic people themselves to denote other people who spoke languages similar to theirs. The first written use of the name "Slavs" dates to the 6th century, when the Slavic tribes inhabited a large portion of Central and Eastern Europe. By then, the nomadic Iranian-speaking peoples living in the European Pontic Steppe (the Scythians, Sarmatians, Alans, etc.) had been absorbed by the region's Slavic-speaking population. Over the next two centuries, the Slavs expanded westwards (to the Elbe river and into the Alps) and southwards (into the Balkans, absorbing Illyrian and Thracian peoples in the process), and also moved eastwards (in the direction of the Volga River). Between the sixth and seventh centuries, large parts of Europe came to be controlled or occupied by Slavs, a process less understood and documented than that of the Germanic ethnogenesis in the west. Yet the effects of Slavicization were far more profound.

Beginning in the 7th century, the Slavs were gradually Christianized by the Church (both western and eastern parts, before the Great Schism of 1054). By the 12th century, they formed the core populations of a number of medieval Christian states: East Slavs in the Kievan Rus', South Slavs in the Bulgarian Empire, the Principality of Serbia, the Duchy of Croatia and the Banate of Bosnia, and West Slavs in the Principality of Nitra, Great Moravia, the Duchy of Bohemia, and the Kingdom of Poland. The oldest known Slavic principality in history was Carantania, established in the 7th century by the Eastern Alpine Slavs, the ancestors of present-day Slovenes. Slavic settlement of the Eastern Alps comprised modern-day Slovenia, Eastern Friuli and large parts of present-day Austria.

== Origins ==
Distribution of the Venedi, Sarmatae and Germanic peoples on the frontier of the Roman Empire in 125 AD. Byzantine sources describe the Venedi as the ancestors of the Sclaveni (Slavs).

Early Roman sources from the 1st and 2nd centuries AD mention a tribe called Veneti. Authors such as Pliny the Elder, Tacitus and Ptolemy described the Veneti as inhabiting the lands east of the Vistula river and along the Venedic Bay (Gdańsk Bay). This tribe has become associated with the early Slavs by the 6th century AD, when they are mentioned as Venethi by the Byzantine writers. Whether the original Veneti from the Roman accounts also spoke a Slavic language remains a topic of debate. Later, three Slavic tribes are mentioned in Byzantine texts, believed to have split from each other during the migration period, and became known to chroniclers as Veneti, Antes and Sclaveni. These tribes are sometimes associated with the three branches of Slavic languages: Veneti with the West Slavs, Sclaveni with the South Slavs and Antes with the East Slavs. In describing the lands of Scythia, the 6th-century historian Jordanes states in his 551 work Getica that "the populous race of the Venethi occupy a great expanse of land. Though their names are now dispersed amid various clans and places, yet they are chiefly called Sklaveni and Antes." Later on, when describing the peoples subject to the Gothic king Ermanaric, Jordanes referred to the Slavs (Sclaveni), noting that "although they derive from one nation, now they are known under three names, the Veneti, Antes and Sclaveni" (ab una stirpe exorti, tria nomina ediderunt, id est Veneti, Antes, Sclaveni).

Procopius wrote that "the Sclaveni and the Ante actually had a single name in the remote past; for they were both called Sporoi in olden times". Possibly the oldest mention of Slavs in historical writing Slověne is attested in Ptolemy's Geography (2nd century) as Σταυανοί (Stavanoi) and Σουοβηνοί (Souobenoi/Sovobenoi, Suobeni, Suoweni), likely referring to early Slavic tribes in a close alliance with the nomadic Alanians, who may have migrated east of the Volga River. In the 8th century during the Early Middle Ages, early Slavs living on the borders of the Carolingian Empire were referred to as Wends (Vender), with the term being a corruption of the earlier Roman-era name.

The earliest archaeological finds connected to the early Slavs are associated with the Zarubintsy, Chernyakhov and Przeworsk cultures from around the 3rd century BC to the 5th century AD. However, in many areas, archaeologists face difficulties in distinguishing between Slavic and non-Slavic findings, as in the case of Chernyakhov and Przeworsk, since the cultures were also attributed to Iranian or Germanic peoples and were not exclusively connected with a single ancient tribal or linguistic group. Later, beginning in the 6th century, Slavic material cultures included the Prague-Korchak, Penkovka, Ipotești–Cândești, and the Sukow-Dziedzice group cultures, with evidence ranging from fortified settlements (gords), ceramic pots, weapons, jewellery and open abodes.

=== Proto-Slavic homeland ===
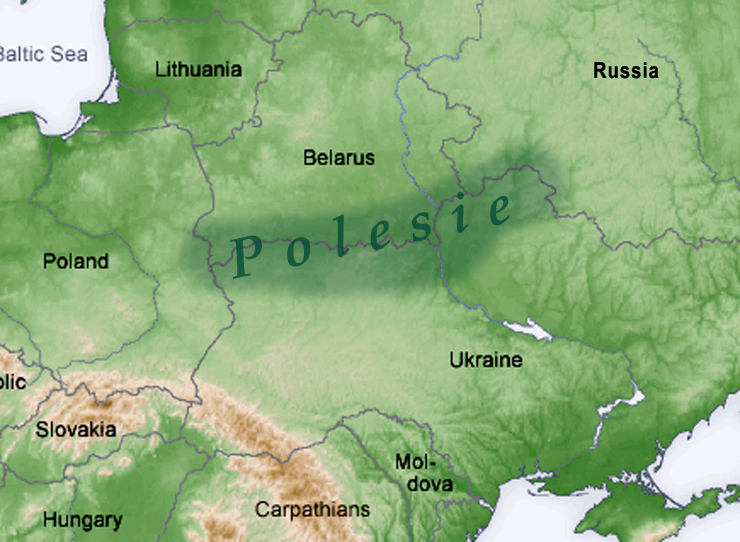
Polesia is the most commonly accepted location for the original Slavic homeland.

The Proto-Slavic homeland is the area of Slavic settlement in Central and Eastern Europe during the first millennium AD, with its precise location debated by archaeologists, ethnographers and historians. Most scholars consider Polesia the homeland of the Slavs. Theories attempting to place Slavic origin in the Near East have been discarded. None of the proposed homelands reach the Volga River in the east, over the Dinaric Alps in the southwest or the Balkan Mountains in the south, or past Bohemia in the west. One of the earliest mentions of the Slavs' original homeland is in the Bavarian Geographer circa 900, which associates the homeland of the Slavs with the Zeriuani, which some equate to the Cherven lands.

According to historical records, the Slavic homeland would have been somewhere in Central-Eastern Europe. The Prague-Penkova-Kolochin complex of cultures of the 6th and the 7th centuries AD is generally accepted to reflect the expansion of Slavic-speakers at the time. See "Archaeology" section below for more details about the Slavs' original homeland.

== Linguistics ==
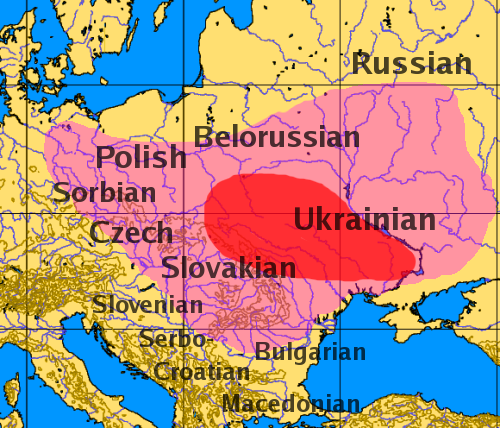
Slavic language distribution, with the Prague-Penkov-Kolochin complex in pink, and the area of Slavic river names in red

Proto-Slavic began to evolve from Proto-Indo-European, the reconstructed language from which originated a number of languages spoken in Eurasia. The Slavic languages share a number of features with the Baltic languages (including the use of genitive case for the objects of negative sentences, the loss of Proto-Indo-European kʷ and other labialized velars), which may indicate a common Proto-Balto-Slavic phase in the development of those two linguistic branches of Indo-European. Frederik Kortlandt places the territory of the common language near the Proto-Indo-European homeland: "The Indo-Europeans who remained after the migrations became speakers of Balto-Slavic". According to the prevailing Kurgan hypothesis, the original homeland of the Proto-Indo-Europeans may have been in the Pontic–Caspian steppe of eastern Europe.

Proto-Slavic developed into a separate language during the first half of the 2nd millennium BC. The Proto-Slavic vocabulary, which was inherited by its daughter languages, described its speakers' physical and social environment, feelings and needs. Proto-Slavic had words for family connections, including svekry ("husband's mother"), and zъly ("sister-in-law"). The inherited Common Slavic vocabulary lacks detailed terminology for physical surface features that are foreign to mountains or the steppe: the sea, coastal features, littoral flora or fauna or saltwater fish.

Proto-Slavic hydronyms have been preserved between the source of the Vistula and the middle basin of the Dnieper. Its northern regions adjoin territory in which river names of Baltic origin (Daugava, Neman and others) abound. On the south and east, it borders the area of Iranian river names (including the Dniester, the Dnieper and the Don). A connection between Proto-Slavic and Iranian languages is also demonstrated by the earliest layer of loanwords in the former; the Proto-Slavic words for god (*bogъ), demon (*divъ), house (*xata), axe (*toporъ) and dog (*sobaka) are of Scythian origin. The Iranian dialects of the Scythians and the Sarmatians influenced Slavic vocabulary during the millennium of contact between them and early Proto-Slavic.

A connection between Proto-Slavic and the Germanic languages can be assumed from the number of Germanic loanwords, such as *kupiti ("to buy"), *xǫdogъ ("skillful"), *šelmъ ("helmet") and *xlěvъ ("barn"). The Common Slavic words for beech, larch and yew were also borrowed from Germanic, which led Polish botanist Józef Rostafiński to place the Slavic homeland in the Pripet Marshes of Polesia, which lack those plants.

Common Slavic dialects before the 4th century AD cannot be detected since all of the daughter languages emerged from later variants. Tonal word stress (a 9th-century AD change) is present in all Slavic languages, and Proto-Slavic reflects the language that was probably spoken at the end of the 1st millennium AD.

== Historiography ==
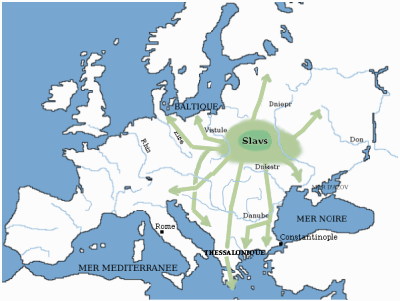
The origin and migration of Slavs in Europe in the 5th to the 10th centuries AD: Original Slavic homeland (modern-day southeastern Poland, northwestern Ukraine and southern Belarus) Expansion of the Slavic migration in Europe

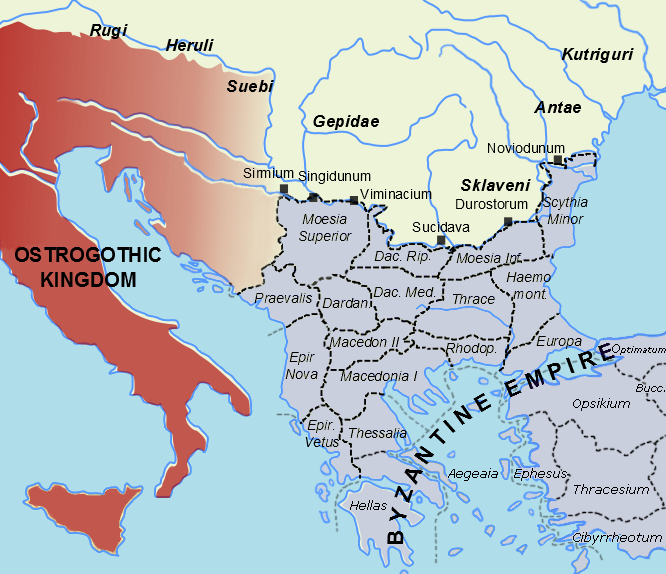
Southeastern Europe in 520, showing the Byzantine Empire under Justin I and the Ostrogothic Kingdom with Migration Period peoples along their borders

Jordanes, Procopius and other Late Roman authors provide the probable earliest references to the southern Slavs in the second half of the 6th century AD. Jordanes completed his Gothic History, an abridgement of Cassiodorus's longer work, in Constantinople in 550 or 551. He also used additional sources: books, maps or oral tradition.

Jordanes wrote that "After the slaughter of the Heruli, Hermanaric also took arms against the Venethi. This people, though despised in war, was strong in numbers and tried to resist him. [...] These people, as we started to say at the beginning of our account or catalogue of nations, though off-shoots from one stock, have now three names, that is, Venethi, Antes and Sclaveni". His claim was accepted more than a millennium later by Wawrzyniec Surowiecki, Pavel Jozef Šafárik and other historians, who searched the Slavic Urheimat in the lands that the Venethi (a people named in Tacitus's Germania) lived during the last decades of the 1st century AD. Pliny the Elder wrote that the territory extending from the Vistula to Aeningia (probably Feningia, or Finland), was inhabited by the Sarmati, Wends, Sciri and Hirri. Jordanes in De origine actibusque Getarum (Ch. 34–35), wrote that "Within these rivers lies Dacia, encircled by the lofty Alps [Carpathian Mountains] as by a crown. Near their left ridge, which inclines toward the north, and beginning at the source of the Vistula, the populous race of the Venethi dwell, occupying a great expanse of land. Though their names are now dispersed amid various clans and places, yet they are chiefly called Sclaveni and Antes. The abode of the Sclaveni extends from the city of Noviodunum and the lake called Mursianus to the Danaster [Dniester] and northward as far as the Vistula. They have swamps and forests for their cities. The Antes, who are the bravest of these peoples dwelling in the curve of the sea of Pontus [Black Sea] spread from the Danaster to the Danaper [Dnieper] rivers that are many days' journey apart".

Procopius completed his three works on Emperor Justinian I's reign (Buildings, History of the Wars, and Secret History) during the 550s. Each book contains detailed information on raids by Sclavenes and Antes on the Eastern Roman Empire, and the History of the Wars has a comprehensive description of their beliefs, customs and dwellings. Although not an eyewitness, Procopius had contacts among the Sclavene mercenaries who were fighting on the Roman side in Italy.

Agreeing with Jordanes's report, Procopius wrote that the Sclavenes and Antes spoke the same languages but traced their common origin not to the Venethi but to a people he called "Sporoi". Sporoi ("seeds" in Greek; compare "spores") is equivalent to the Latin semnones and germani ("germs" or "seedlings"), and the German linguist Jacob Grimm believed that Suebi meant "Slav". Jordanes and Procopius called the Suebi "Suavi". The end of the Bavarian Geographer's list of Slavic tribes contains a note: "Suevi are not born, they are sown (seminati)".

A similar description of the Sclavenes and Antes is found in the Strategikon of Maurice, a military handbook written between 592 and 602 and attributed to Emperor Maurice. Its author, an experienced officer, participated in the Eastern Roman campaigns against the Sclavenes on the lower Danube at the end of the century. A military staff member was also the source of Theophylact Simocatta's narrative of the same campaigns.

Although Martin of Braga was the first western author to refer to a people known as "Sclavus" before 580, Jonas of Bobbio included the earliest lengthy record of the nearby Slavs in his Life of Saint Columbanus (written between 639 and 643). Jonas referred to the Slavs as "Veneti" and noted that they were also known as "Sclavi".

Western authors, including Fredegar and Boniface, preserved the term "Venethi". The Franks (in the Life of Saint Martinus, the Chronicle of Fredegar and Gregory of Tours), Lombards (Paul the Deacon) and Anglo-Saxons (Widsith) referred to Slavs in the Elbe-Saale region and Pomerania as "Wenden" or "Winden" (see Wends). The Franks and the Bavarians of Styria and Carinthia called their Slavic neighbours "Windische", which is still seen today in the names given to Slovene towns and villages by German speakers. Example: Slovene Slovenj Gradec and German: Windisch-Graetz.

The unknown author of the Chronicle of Fredegar used the word "Venedi" (and variants) to refer to a group of Slavs who were subjugated by the Avars. In the chronicle, "Venedi" formed a state that emerged from a revolt led by the Frankish merchant Samo against the Avars around 623. A change in terminology, the replacement of Slavic tribal names for the collective "Sclavenes" and "Antes", occurred at the end of the century; the first tribal names were recorded in the second book of the Miracles of Saint Demetrius, around 690. The unknown "Bavarian Geographer" listed Slavic tribes in the Frankish Empire around 840, and a detailed description of 10th-century tribes in the Balkan Peninsula was compiled under the auspices of Emperor Constantine VII Porphyrogenitus in Constantinople around 950.

== Archaeology ==
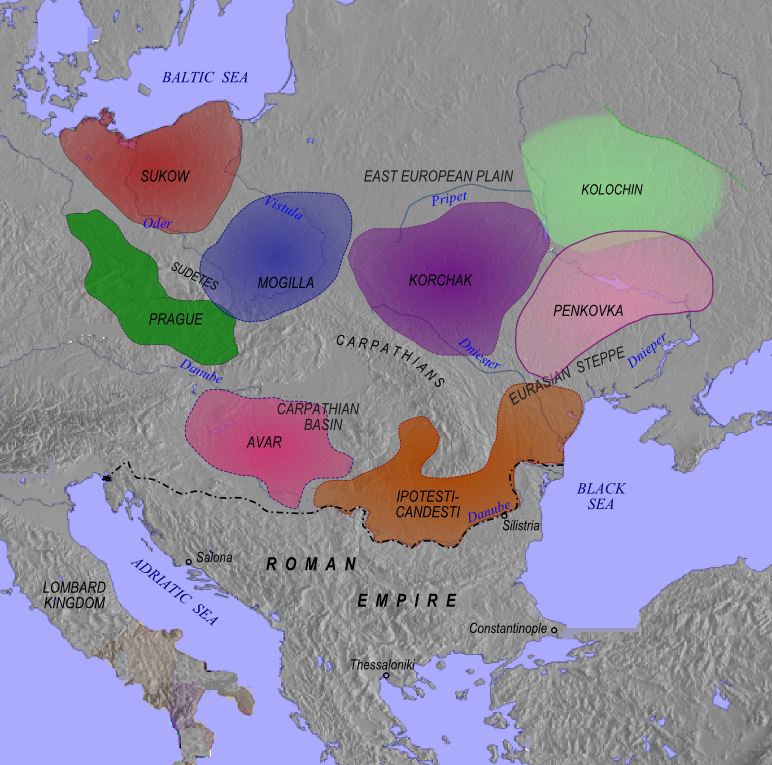
7th-century Slavic cultures (the Prague-Penkov-Kolochin complex). The Prague and the Mogilla cultures reflect the separation of the early Western Slavs (the Sukow-Dziedzice group in the northwest may be the earliest Slavic expansion to the Baltic Sea); the Kolochin culture represents the early East Slavs; the Penkovka culture and its southwestward extension, the Ipoteşti-Cândeşti culture, demonstrate early Slavic expansion into the Balkans, which would later result in the separation of the South Slavs, associated with the Antes people of Byzantine historiography. In the Carpathian basin, the Eurasian Avars began to be Slavicized during the Slavic settlement of the Eastern Alps.

In the archaeological literature, attempts have been made to assign an early Slavic character to several cultures in a number of time periods and regions. They are mainly related to the Kiev culture which flourished from the 2nd to the 5th centuries in the "middle and upper Dnieper basin, akin to it sites of the type Zaozer´e in the upper Dnieper and the upper Daugava basins, and finally the groups of sites of the type Cherepyn–Teremtsy in the upper Dniester basin and of the type Ostrov in the Pripyat basin". It is recognised as the predecessor of the 6th- and 7th-century Prague-Korchak, Prague-Penkovka and Kolochin cultural horizons that encompass Slavic cultures from the Dniester to the Elbe. "Prague culture" in a narrow sense, refers to western Slavic material grouped around Bohemia, Moravia and western Slovakia, distinct from the Mogilla (southern Poland) and Korchak (western-central Ukraine and southern Belarus) groups further east. The Prague and Mogilla groups are seen as the archaeological reflection of the 6th-century Western Slavs.

Previously, the 2nd-to-5th-century Chernyakhov culture encompassed modern Ukraine, Moldova and Wallachia. Chernyakov finds include polished black-pottery vessels, fine metal ornaments and iron tools. Soviet scholars, such as Boris Rybakov, saw it as the archaeological reflection of the proto-Slavs. The Chernyakov zone is now seen as representing the cultural interaction of several peoples, one of which was rooted in Scytho-Sarmatian traditions, which were modified by Germanic elements that were introduced by the Goths. The semi-subterranean dwelling with a corner hearth later became typical of early Slavic sites, with Volodymir Baran calling it a Slavic "ethnic badge". In the Carpathian foothills of Podolia, at the northwestern fringes of the Chernyakov zone, the Slavs gradually became a culturally-unified people; the multiethnic environment of the Chernyakhov zone presented a "need for self-identification in order to manifest their differentiation from other groups".

The Przeworsk culture, northwest of the Chernyakov zone, extended from the Dniester to the Tisza valley and north to the Vistula and Oder. It was an amalgam of local cultures, most with roots in earlier traditions modified by influences from the (Celtic) La Tène culture, (Germanic) Jastorf culture beyond the Oder and the Bell-Grave culture of the Polish plain. The Venethi may have played a part; other groups included the Vandals, Burgundians and Sarmatians. East of the Przeworsk settlements, in the Dnieper forest zone, was the Zarubintsy culture, which is sometimes considered part of the Przeworsk complex. Early Slavic hydronyms are found in the area occupied by the Zarubintsy culture, and Irina Rusanova demonstrated that the most prototypical examples of Prague-type pottery had originated there. Since Pyotr Tretyakov's 1960s works, the Zarubintsy culture (that spans the period from the 2nd century BC to the 2nd century AD) has been identified as proto-Slavic, or as an ethnically mixed community that became Slavicized.

As for the archaeological tradition preceding the Zarubintsy culture, there is no established consensus. In the mid-20th century it was common to assign modern ethnic labels to the archaeological cultures from the times of Herodotus (i.e., preceding the earliest demonstrably Slavic artefacts by a millennium). Since the late 20th century, the confidence with which archaeological connections can be made to known historic groups has lessened. According to many pre-historians, ethnic labels are inappropriate for European Iron Age peoples.

For instance, the Milograd culture (700 BC–100 AD), centred roughly in today's Belarus, used to be proposed as ancestral to the Zarubintsy culture (and thus ancestral to the Slavs). Later, Valentin Sedov (among many others) assigned it to the Dnieper Balts, and Andrey Oblomsky maintains that the Milograd culture left no demonstrable descendants.

The 8th-to-3rd-century BC Chernoles culture, stretching to the south from the Milograd culture and often associated with Herodotus' "Scythian farmers", was "sometimes portrayed as either a state in the development of the Slavic languages or at least some form of late Indo-European ancestral to the evolution of the Slavic stock". Boris Rybakov described it as a stage in the evolution of the Slavs, and Marija Gimbutas identified it as the proto-Slavic homeland. On the other hand, Mikhail Artamonov classified the population associated with this culture as Thracian. Among Soviet scholars, Boris Grakov and Pyotr Tretyakov were sceptical of such straightforward identifications. In 1966, Tretyakov concluded that the Zarubintsy culture resulted from a "cultural-ethnic integration" of heterogeneous Iron Age groups.

Based on similarities with the Zarubintsy culture, along with certain linguistic and genetic arguments, some scholars raise the question of the possible existence of para-Slavic groups that could represent early migrations of proto-Slavs (or closely related peoples) not documented in written sources. The Imenkovo culture, which occupied the Middle Volga region during the Migration Period (prior to the arrival of the Bulgars), has often been interpreted as a para-Slavic group.

== Ethnogenesis ==
=== Culture-historical viewpoint ===
According to the mainstream and culture-historical viewpoint which emphasizes the primordial model of ethnogenesis, the Slavic homeland in the forests and wetlands enabled them to preserve their ethnic identity, language except for phonetic and some lexical constituents, and their patrilineal, agricultural customs. The origins of the early Slavs go back to the Zarubintsy and Chernyakov cultures, and the area between the Vistula and Dnieper rivers; centered on the Pripet Marshes of Polesia. Also, the Zarubintsy and Chernyakov cultures may explain a later division of early Slavs into separate groups during the migration period.

Paul Barford suggested that Slavic groups might have existed in a wide area of central-eastern Europe (in the Chernyakov and Zarubintsy-Przeworsk cultural zones) before the documented Slavic migrations from the sixth to the ninth centuries. Serving as auxiliaries in the Sarmatian, Goth and Hun armies, small numbers of Slavic speakers might have reached the Balkans before the sixth century. After a millennium, when the Hunnic Empire collapsed and the Avars arrived shortly afterwards, the Slavs emerged and spread rapidly across central and south-eastern Europe, bringing along with them, their customs and language.

According to Marija Gimbutas, "[n]either Bulgars nor Avars colonized the Balkan Peninsula; after storming Thrace, Illyria, and Greece they went back to their territory north of the Danube. It was the Slavs who did the colonizing ... entire families or even whole tribes infiltrated lands. As an agricultural people, they constantly sought an outlet for the population surplus. Suppressed for over a millennium by foreign rule of Scythians, Sarmatians and Goths, they had been restricted to a small territory; now the barriers were down and they poured out".

Walter Pohl concluded that it is "easy to conclude that the less developed, more 'primitive' form of organisation was better adapted to the conditions. It was not simply the large numbers that made the Slavs successful, although authors of the 6th century already emphasised their mass appearance. A gens can only become numerous if its way of life and gentile constitution correspond well to the external conditions. Both were the case with the Slavs. A simple but very adaptable mixed agriculture made it possible to settle devastated or uncultivated areas between the Baltic and the Aegean".

In addition to their demographic growth, the depopulation of central-eastern Europe due, in part, to Germanic emigration, the lack of Roman imperial defenses on the frontiers which were decimated after centuries of conflicts and especially the Plague of Justinian, also the Late Antique Little Ice Age (536–660 CE) encouraged Slavic expansion and settlement to the west and the south of the Carpathian Mountains. The migrationist model remains the most acceptable and logical explanation of the spread of Slavs and Slavic culture (including language).

=== Processual viewpoint ===
According to the processual viewpoint which emphasizes the culture-social model of ethnogenesis, there is "no need to explain culture change exclusively in terms of migration and population replacement". It argues that the Slavic expansion was primarily "a linguistic spread". The Slavic languages spread throughout regions of Europe for different reasons. Jouko Lindstedt wrote that "there is no single explanation for the Slavic spread in the east of Europe as there was in the west for the spread of Latin and Proto-Romance." Central Europe was slavicized by Slavic migration. Having been largely abandoned by Germanic populations in the 6th century, the Baltic region and the Elbe river were re-settled by Slavic populations. The East Slavic languages spread throughout eastern Europe by way of migration and language shift. East Slavic had become a prestige language through its adoption of literacy, displacing Finno-Ugric and Baltic languages, while absorbing elements of the former. South Slavic languages spread throughout the Balkans, replacing the languages of the Romanized and Hellenized local populations as a result of complex language shifts, involving tribal networks created through the spread of newly militarized Slavic tribes. Horace Lunt attributes the spread of Slavic to the "success and mobility of the Slavic 'special border guards' of the Avar khanate", who used it as a lingua franca in the Avar Khaganate. According to Lunt, only as a lingua franca could Slavic supplant other languages and dialects whilst remaining relatively uniform. Although it could explain the formation of regional Slavic groups in the Balkans, the Eastern Alps and the Morava-Danube basin, Lunt's theory does not account for the spread of Slavic to the Baltic region and the territory of the Eastern Slavs, which are areas with no historical links to the Pannonian Avars. However, the idea of Slavic as a lingua franca is highly doubtful because the Late Proto-Slavic/Common Slavic had a complex morphological and accentological system, as well Avars and Slavs had no social and economical mechanisms for spread of lingua franca. As concluded by Alan Timberlake, "there was demic movement, the recent vilification of migration notwithstanding ... the spread of Slavic is not especially complex", it was mostly due to natives depopulation, secondly interaction with and adoption by other ethnic groups, and thirdly Slavic assimilation of small groups of foreign speaking people.

A concept related to elite dominance is the notion of system collapse, in which a power vacuum created by the fall of the Hun and Roman Empires allowed a minority group to impose their customs and language. A more extreme hypothesis is argued by Florin Curta who considers that the Slavs as an "ethno-political category" were invented by an external source – the Byzantines – through political instrumentation and interaction on the Roman frontiers where a barbarian elite culture flourished.

However, Michel Kazanski concludes that although both "the movement of the populations of the Slavic cultural model and the diffusion of this model amid non-Slavic populations [occurred] (...) a pure diffusion of the Slavic model would hardly be possible, in any case in which a long period of time when the populations of different cultural traditions lived close to one another is assumed. Moreover, archaeologists researching Slavic antiquities do not accept the ideas produced by the "diffusionists", because most of the champions of the diffusion model know the specific archaeological materials poorly, so their works leave room for a number of arbitrary interpretations".

=== Genetics ===
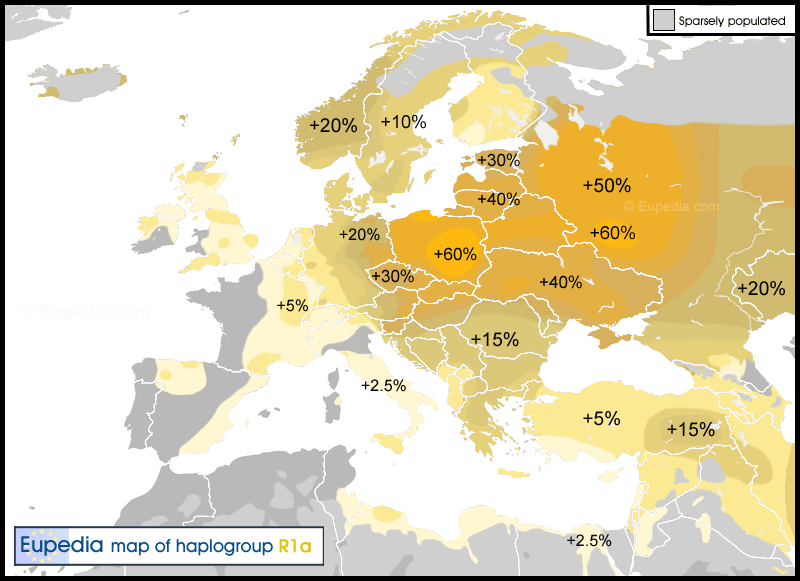
Map of R1a (Y-DNA) in Europe.

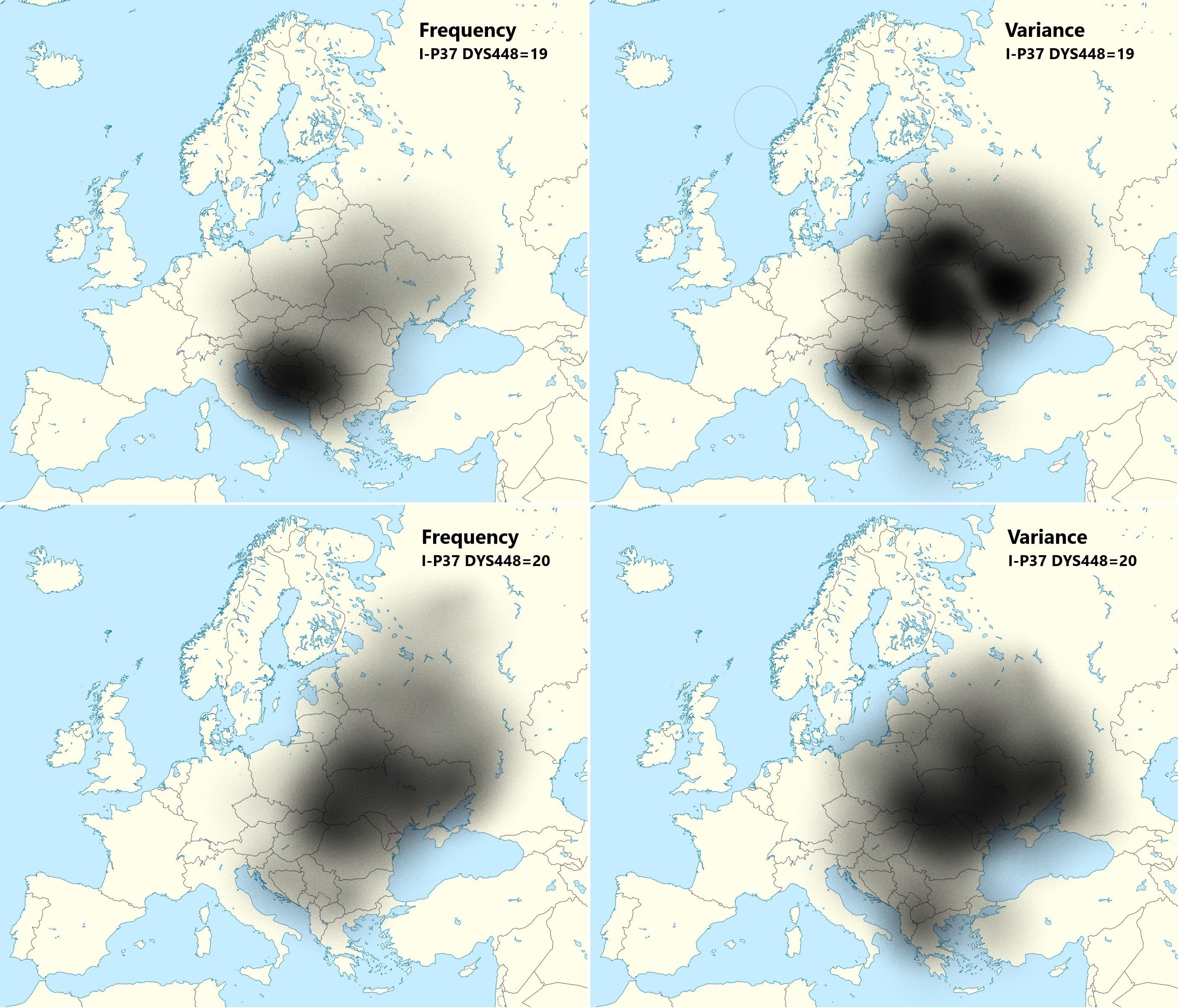
The approximate frequency and variance distribution of haplogroup I2-P37 clusters, ancestral "Dnieper-Carpathian" (DYS448=20) and derived "Balkan" (DYS448=19: represented by a single SNP I-PH908), in Eastern Europe per O.M. Utevska (2017).

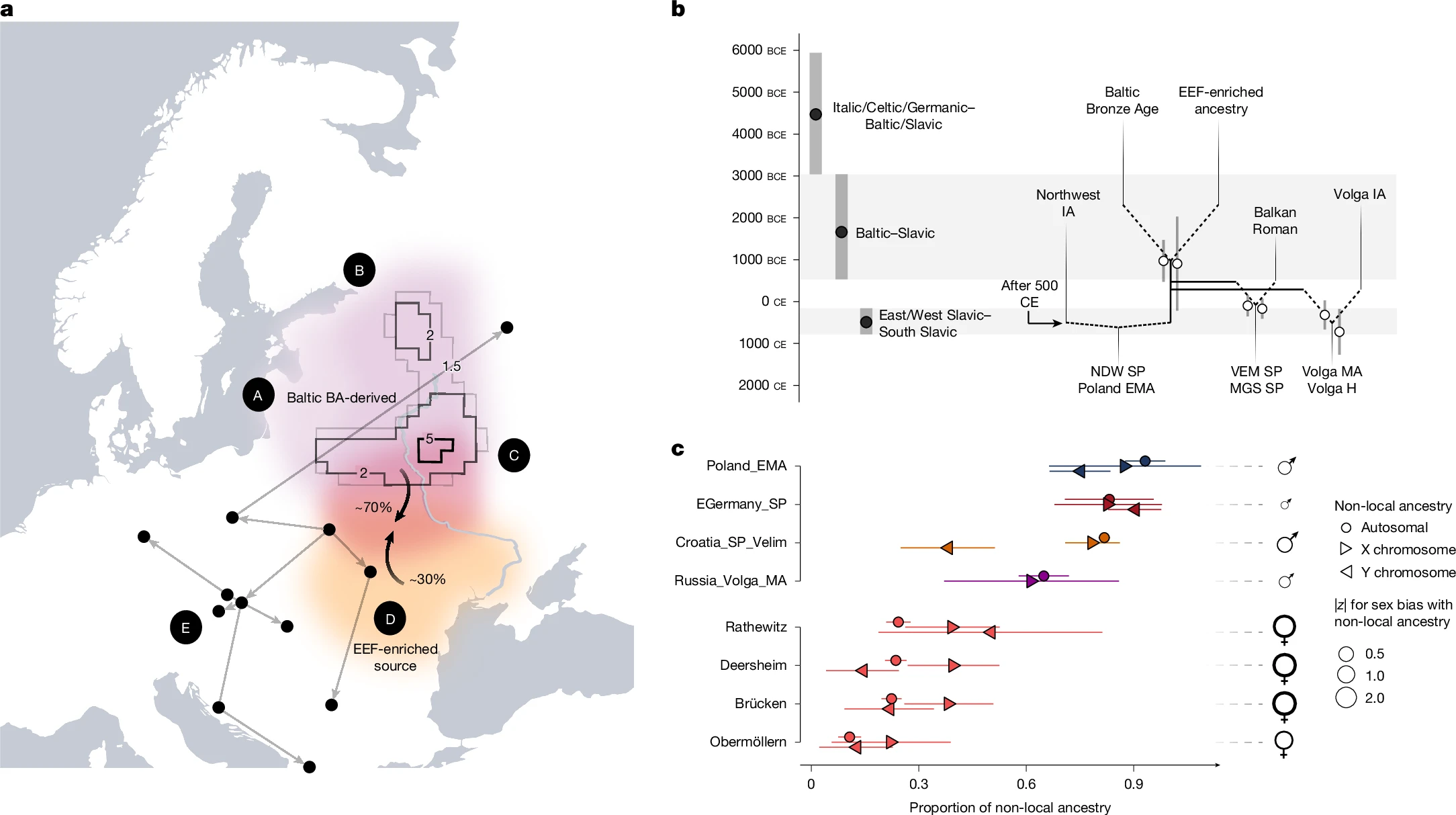
Formation, and putative migration directions of the Slavs during the migration period, per Gretzinger et al. (2025).

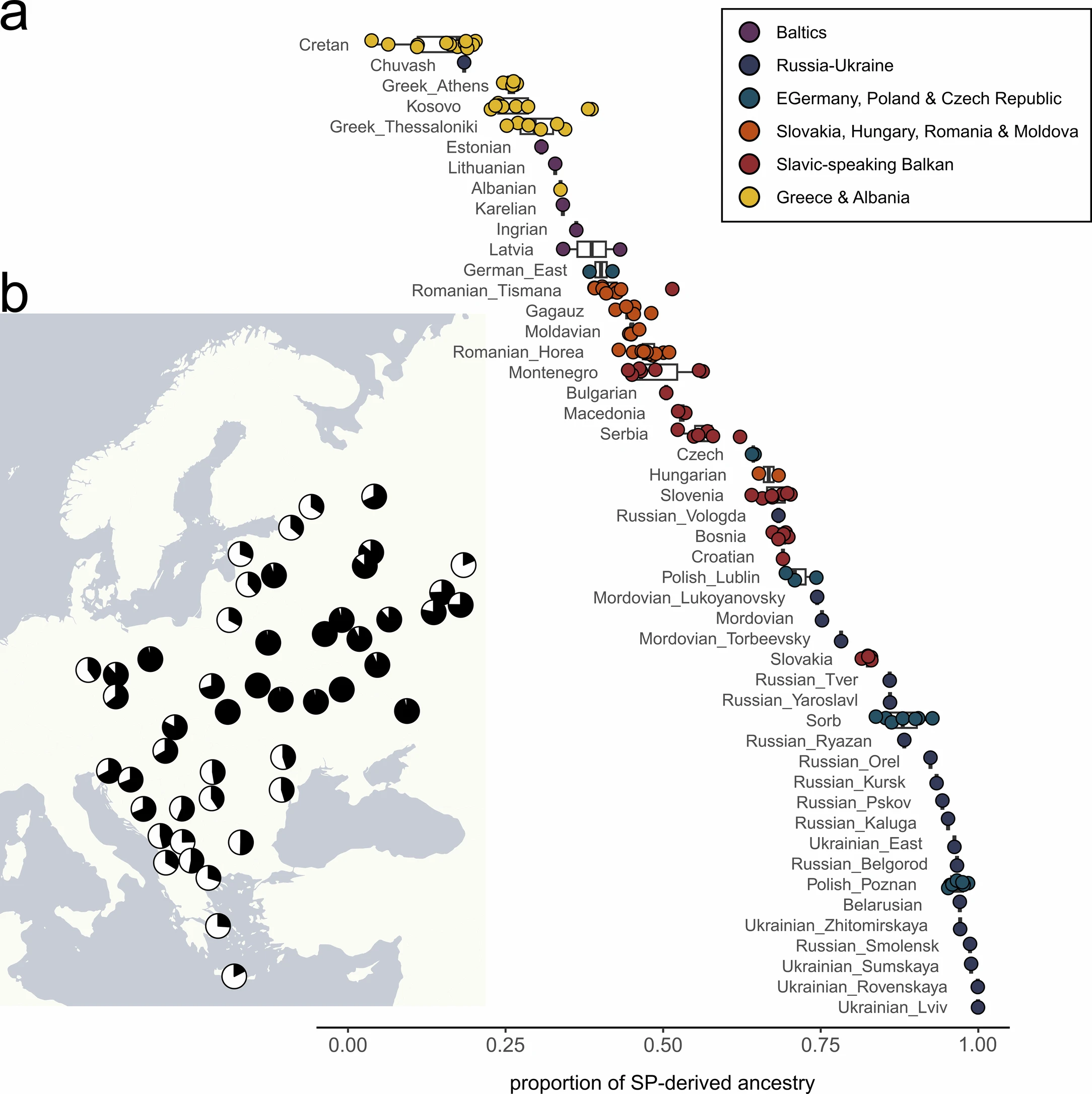
The genetic legacy of the Slavic expansion (black), per Gretzinger et al. (2025).

Attempts to identify the origin of Slavs and Slavic language include studies of the paternal and maternal genetic lineages, as well as autosomal DNA, of all existing modern Slavic populations. The variance and frequency of the Y-DNA haplogroups R1a and I2 subclades R-M558, R-M458, and I-CTS10228 correlate with the Slavic early medieval migration and spread of Slavic language from Eastern Europe, most probably from the territory of present-day Ukraine (within the area of the middle Dnieper basin) and Southeastern Poland. A 2010 study observed that "a significant part of the spread of Slavic culture should result from real population movements. If Slavic culture was spread by cultural exchange only (or in very large part) then there would be no chance of any significant mixing between peoples of Slavic and Germanic origin".

According to the 2013 autosomal IBD study "of recent genealogical ancestry over the past 3,000 years at a continental scale", there's a very high number of common ancestors between South Slavs and Poles. It is concluded to be caused by the Hunnic and Slavic expansion, which was a "relatively small population that expanded over a large geographic area", particularly "the expansion of the Slavic populations into regions of low population density beginning in the sixth century" and that it is "highly coincident with the modern distribution of Slavic languages". According to Kushniarevich et al. 2015, the Hellenthal et al. 2014 IBD analysis, also found "multi-directional admixture events among East Europeans (both Slavic and non-Slavic), dated to around 1,000–1,600 YBP" which coincides with "the proposed time-frame for the Slavic expansion". The Slavic influence is "dated to 500-900 CE or a bit later with over 40-50% among Bulgarians, Romanians, and Hungarians". The 2015 IBD analysis found that the South Slavs have lower proximity to Greeks than with East Slavs and West Slavs and that there's an "even patterns of IBD sharing among East-West Slavs–'inter-Slavic' populations (Hungarians, Romanians and Gagauz)–and South Slavs, i.e. across an area of assumed historic movements of people including Slavs". The slight peak of shared IBD segments between South and East-West Slavs suggests a shared "Slavonic-time ancestry". According to a recent admixture analysis of Western Balkan, the South Slavs show a genetic uniformity, with the modeled ancestral Balto-Slavic genetic component among contemporary South Slavs being between 55% and 70%, specifically 66.5±2.7% in Croats, 58.4±2.1% in Serbs and 51.2±2.2% in Bulgarians based on archaeogenetic data.

A 2022 archaeogenetic study published in Science compared ancient, medieval and modern population samples and confirmed that the medieval Slavic migrations "profoundly affected the region", resulting in the reduction of Anatolian Neolithic ancestry in Southeastern Europe. Pre-Slavic Balkan populations have most of the Anatolian Neolithic component of ancestry, whereas present-day Slavs outside the Balkans have the least, "with present-day people from Southeastern Europe intermediate between the two extremes" (with Croats and Hungarians being the most Slavic). A 2023 archaeogenetic IBD study found that the Slavs make a specific and recognizable genetic cluster which "was formed by admixture of a Baltic-related group with East Germanic people and Sarmatians or Scythians". A late 2023 archaeogenetic study published in Cell, based on 146 samples, confirmed that the spread of Slavic language and identity in Southeastern Europe was because of large movements of people of both males and females with specific Eastern European ancestry, they carried Y-DNA haplogroups I2a-L621 and R1a-Z282, and that "more than half of the ancestry of most peoples in the Balkans today comes from the Slavic migrations, with around a third Slavic ancestry even in countries like Greece where no Slavic languages are spoken today".

A 2023 archaeogenetic study found a genetic shift related to the migration of the Slavs and Slavic language in medieval northwestern Russia. Another study published in Genome Biology also found genetic shift between Iron Age (IA) and Medieval Age (MA) in Poland, as in the former period male the most frequent Y-DNA haplogroup was I1 (41.3% IA > 3.5% MA), while in the latter period it was R1a (8.6% IA < 57.5% MA), with R1a-M458 also found in IA, while R1a-S204/Z280 is absent in the IA, showing with autosomal DNA both genetic continuity and discontinuity.

A 2025 comprehensive archaeogenetic study published in Nature on 555 samples out of which 359 from the Slavic period, "demonstrate large-scale population movement from Eastern Europe during the sixth to eighth centuries, replacing more than 80% of the local gene pool in Eastern Germany [83±6%], Poland [93±3%] and Croatia [82±1%]" and that "on the European scale, it appears plausible that the changes in material culture and language between the sixth and eighth centuries were connected to these large-scale population movements". To the same conclusion came a Genome Biology study about South Moravia, finding "a strong genetic shift incompatible with local continuity between the fifth and seventh century, supporting the notion that the Slavic expansion in South Moravia was driven by population movement". Also, in the first 2025 study, it was considered that the "best spatial proxy" of the Slavic Urheimat was in the south of Belarus and north of Ukraine, indicative of the Kyiv culture.

== Appearance ==
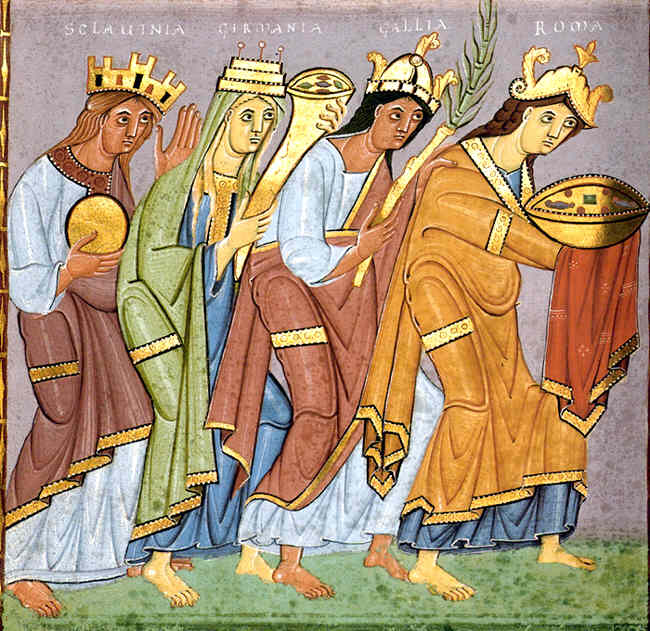
Depiction of an early Slav as a personification of "Sclavinia", from Otto's Gospel Book, 990 AD

In the Chronica Slavorum, Helmold writes on the Wends "These men have blue eyes, ruddy faces, and long hair". Ibrahim ibn Yaqub mentioned the Slavs were bearded. Procopius wrote that the Slavs "are all tall and especially strong, their skin is not very white, and their hair is neither blond nor black, but all have reddish hair". Jordanes wrote "...all of them are tall and very strong... their skin and hair are neither very dark nor light, but are ruddy of face". Ibrahim Ibn Ya'qub wrote: "They wear ample robes, although the ends of their sleeves are narrow". Procopious wrote that the men also wear a kind of breeches pulled up to the waist. Procopius wrote that Slavic warriors were armed with spears, without armour, carrying small light shields, and went almost naked into battle. Similarly, Tacitus describing the Germanic warriors stated that they all carried short spears, rarely swords, and were scarcely dressed, going almost naked.

Theophylact Simocatta wrote about the Slavs that "The Emperor was with great curiosity listening to stories about this tribe, he has welcomed these newcomers from the land of barbarians, and after being amazed by their height and mighty stature, he sent these men to Heraclea". Hisham ibn al-Kalbi described the Slavs as "...a numerous nation, fair-haired and of ruddy complexion", and Al-Baladuri made reference to the Slavs, writing "If the Prince so willed, outside of his doors would be black Sudanians or ruddy Slavs".

== Society ==
Early Slavic society was a typical decentralised tribal society of Iron Age Europe and was organised into local chiefdoms. A slow consolidation occurred between the 7th and the 9th, when the previously uniform Slavic cultural area evolved into discrete zones. Slavic groups were influenced by neighbouring cultures like Byzantium, the Khazars, the Vikings and the Carolingians and influenced their neighbours in return.

these nations, the Sclaveni and the Antes, are not ruled by one man, but they have lived from of old under a democracy, and consequently everything which involves their welfare, whether for good or ill, is referred to the people.

— Procopius

Differences in status gradually developed in the chiefdoms, which led to the development of centralized socio-political organisations. The first centralized organisations may have been temporary pantribal warrior associations, the greatest evidence being in the Danubian area, where barbarian groups organised around military chiefs to raid Byzantine territory and to defend themselves against the Pannonian Avars. Social stratification gradually developed in the form of fortified, hereditary chiefdoms, which were first seen in the West Slavs areas. The chief was supported by a retinue of warriors, who owed their position to him. As chiefdoms became powerful and expanded, centres of subsidiary power ruled by lesser chiefs were created, and the line between powerful chiefdoms and centralised medieval states is blurred. By the mid-9th century, the Slavic elite had become sophisticated; they wore luxurious clothing, rode horses, hunted with falcons and travelled with retinues of soldiers. These chiefs were often at war with one another. al-Masudi, a 10th-century Muslim historian, geographer, and traveler, writes the following about the tribal organisation of the Slavs:

"Among the different peoples who make up this pagan race, there is one that in ancient times held sovereign power. Their king was called Mājik and they themselves were known as Walītābā. In the past, all the Saqaliba recognized their superiority, because it was from among them that they chose the paramount ruler, and all the other chieftains considered themselves his vassals." "I began by mentioning the king whose suzerainty has been recognized by all the other rulers since ancient times, that is to say Mājik, king of the Walītābā, who are the original, pure-blooded Saqaliba, the most highly honoured, and take precedence over all the other branches of the race."

Ibrahim ibn Yaqub, a 10th-century Hispano-Arabic, Sephardi Jewish traveler, writes the following about the same events:

"They are of many different kinds. They were once united under a king named Makha, who was from a group of them called Walītābā. This group was of high status among them, but then their languages diverged, unity was broken and the people divided into factions, each of them ruled by their own king."

=== Tribal and territorial organisation ===
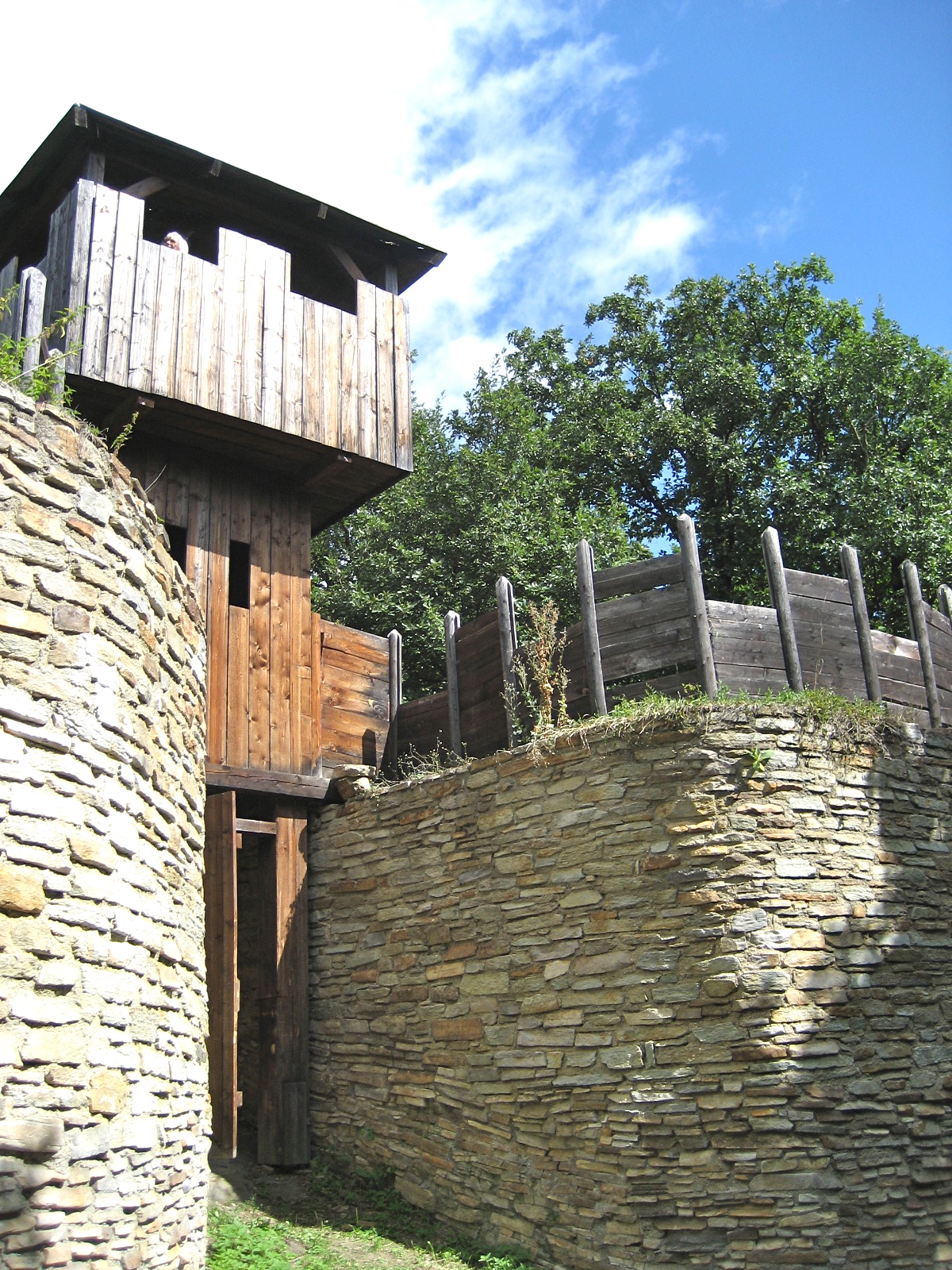
Reconstruction of a Slavic gatehouse in Thunau am Kamp, Austria. The site excavated in the 1980s dates back to the era of the Great Moravia in the 9th and 10th centuries.

There is no indication of Slavic chiefs in any of the Slavic raids before AD 560, when Pseudo-Caesarius's writings mentioned their chiefs but described the Slavs as living by their own law and without the rule of anyone.

The Sclaveni and the Antes were reported to have lived under a primitive or military democracy without social stratification "since the earliest times". The 6th-century historian Procopius, who was in contact with Slavic mercenaries, reported, "For these nations, the Sclaveni and the Antes, are not governed by one man, but from ancient times have lived in democracy, and consequently everything which involves their welfare, whether for good or for ill, is referred to the people" (in joint meetings). The 6th-century Strategikon of Maurice is considered an eyewitness of the Slavs and recommended the Roman generals to use any possible means to prevent the Sclaveni from uniting "under one ruler" and added that "the Sclaveni and Antes were both independent, absolutely refused to be enslaved or governed, least of all in their own land". However, historical sources in several instances mention chieftains leading a tribal federation or alliance with other chiefs, like Daurentius (570s, of Lower Danube Slavs), Chatzon (615s, of Sagudates, Belegezites, Baiounitai, Berziti), Samo (623–658, West Slavs, Slovenes), Dervan (630s, Sorbs), Perbundos (670s, of Rhynchinoi and Strymonites). They had an assembly institution called the věče.

Settlements were not uniformly distributed but were in clusters separated by areas of lower settlement density. The clusters resulted from the expansion of single settlements, and the "settlement cells" were linked by familial or clan relationships (called zadruga). Settlement cells were the basis of the simplest form of territorial organization, known as a župa in South Slavic and opole in Polish. According to the Primary Chronicle, "The men of the Polanie lived each with his own clan in his own place". Several župas, encompassing individual clan territories, formed the known tribes: "The complex processes initiated by the Slav expansion and subsequent demographic and ethnic consolidation culminated in the formation of tribal groups, which later coalesced to create state which form the framework of the ethnic make-up of modern eastern Europe".

The root of many tribal names denotes the territory in which they inhabited, such as the Milczanie (who lived in areas with měl – loess), Moravians (along the Morava), Diokletians (near the former Roman city of Doclea) and Severiani (northerners). Other names have more general meanings, such as the Polanes (pola; field) and Drevlyans (drevo; tree). Others appear to have a non-Slavic (possibly Iranian) root, such as the Antes and Croats. Some geographically distant tribes appear to share names. The Dregoviti appear north of the Pripyat River and in the Vardar valley, the Croats in Galicia and Dalmatia/Pannonia, the Sorbs/Serbs in Saxony and Western/Central Balkans, and the Obodrites near Lübeck and further south in Pannonia. The root Slav was retained in the modern names of the Slovenes, Slovaks and Slavonians.

== Culture ==
=== Settlements ===
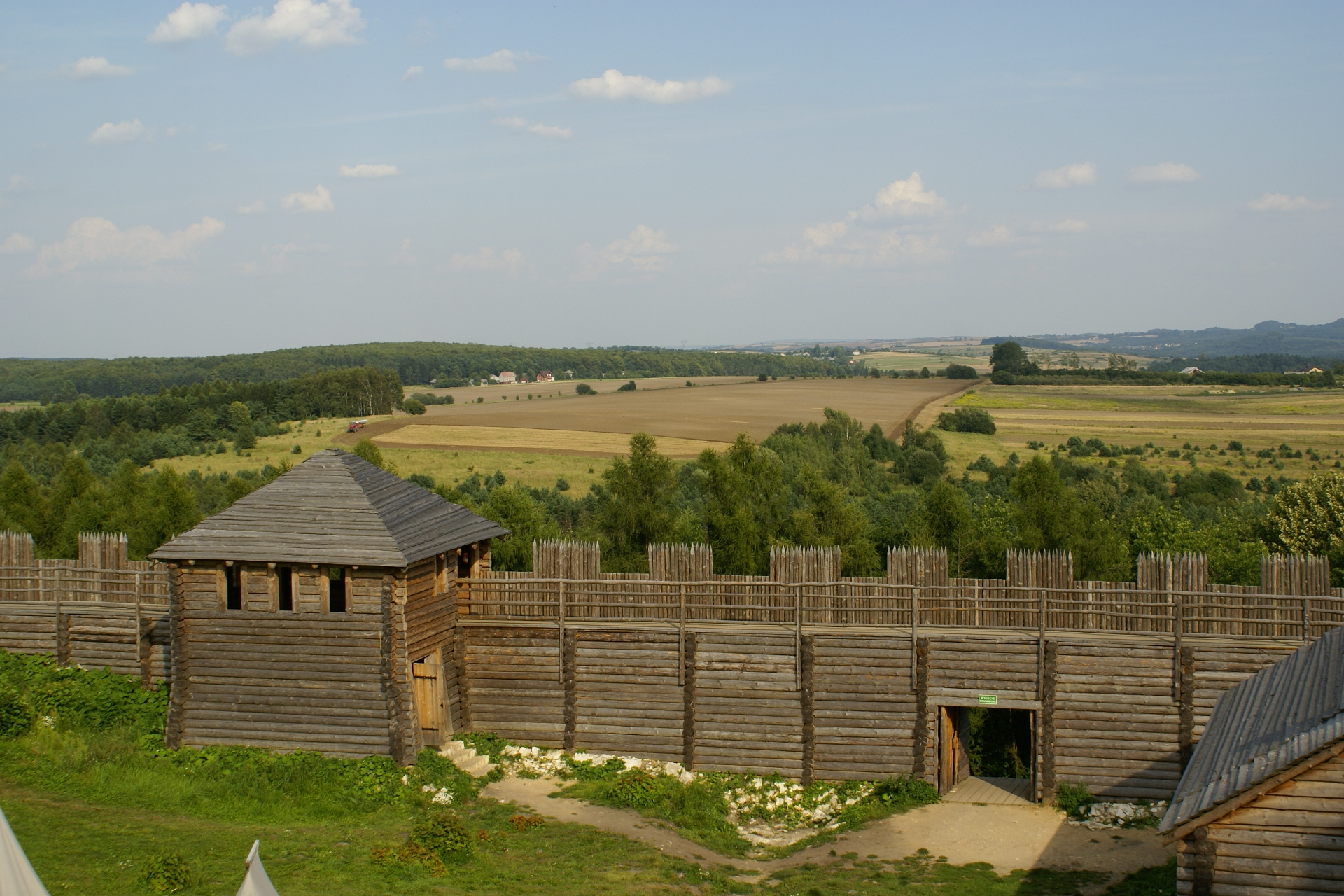
Reconstruction of a Slavic hilltop gród in Birów, Poland

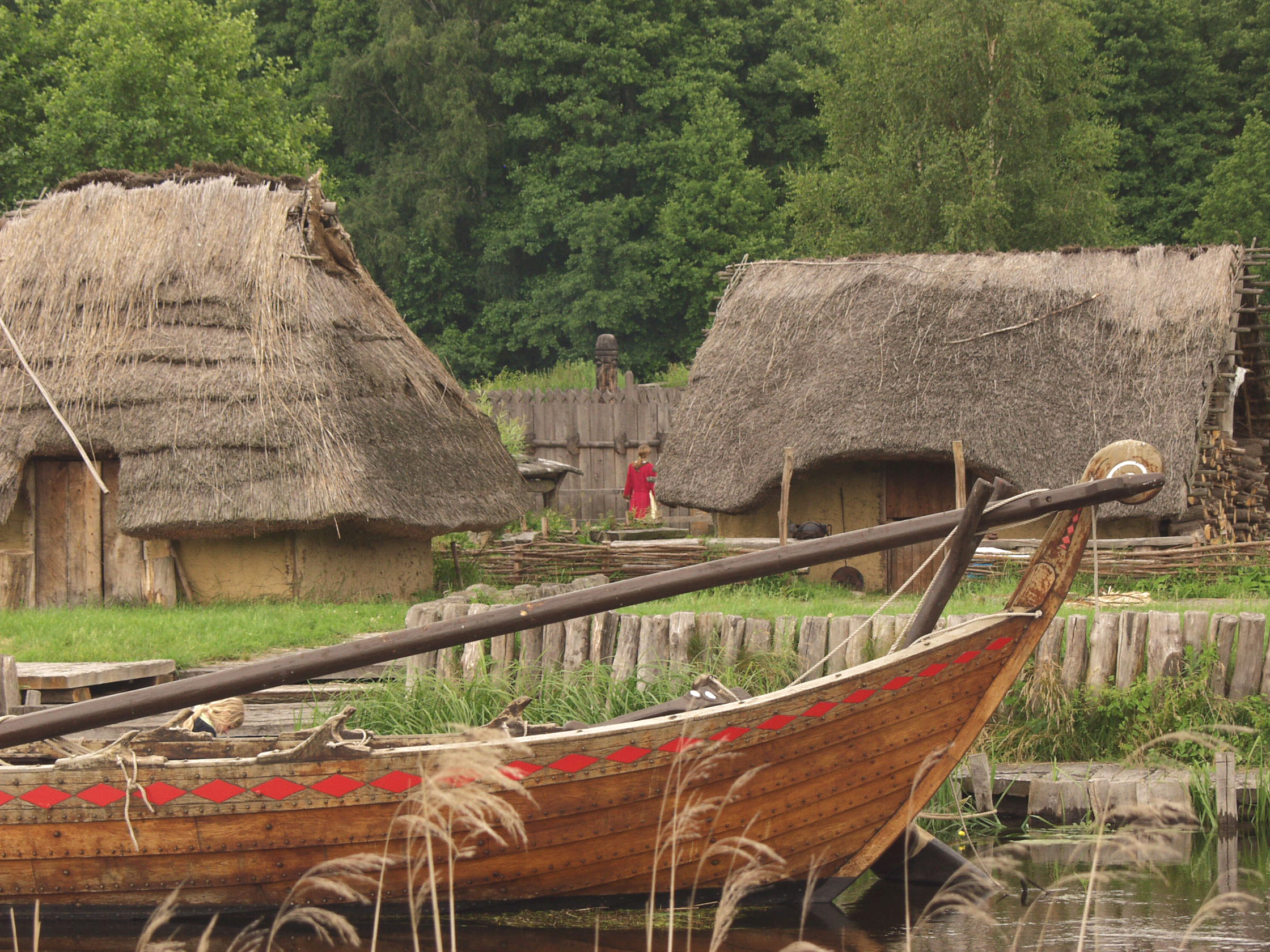
Reconstruction of a Slavic settlement in Torgelow, Germany

Early Slavic settlements were no bigger than 0.5 to 2 hectares (1.2 to 4.9 acres). Settlements were often temporary, perhaps reflected their itinerant form of agriculture, and were often along rivers. They were characterised by sunken buildings, known as Grubenhäuser in German or poluzemlianki in Russian. Built over a rectangular pit, they varied from 4 to 20 m^{2} (43 to 215 sq ft) in area and could accommodate a typical nuclear family. Each house had a stone or clay oven in a corner (a defining feature of Eastern European dwellings), and a settlement had a population of fifty to seventy. Settlements had a central, open area in which communal activities and ceremonies were conducted, and they were divided into production and settlement zones.

The Slavs also built underground shelters roofed with wood to keep out the cold during winter.

Log cabin saunas were also used as recorded by Ibrahim Ibn Ya'qub: "They have no baths but they use log cabins in which gaps are stuffed with something that appears on their trees and looks like seaweed – they call it mech (original mh = moss)... In one corner they put up a stone stove and above it they open up a hole to let the smoke from the stove escape. When the stove is good and hot, they close up the opening and close the door of the hut. Inside are vessels with water and they pour out of them water onto the hot stove and steam comes from it. Each of them has in his hand a tuft of grass with which they make air circulate and draw it to themselves. Then their pores open up and the unneeded substances from their bodies come out..." The "moss" appears to refer to beard moss, Usnea (Arabic: أشنة), which is used as thermal insulator to plug the gaps between logs in log cabins.

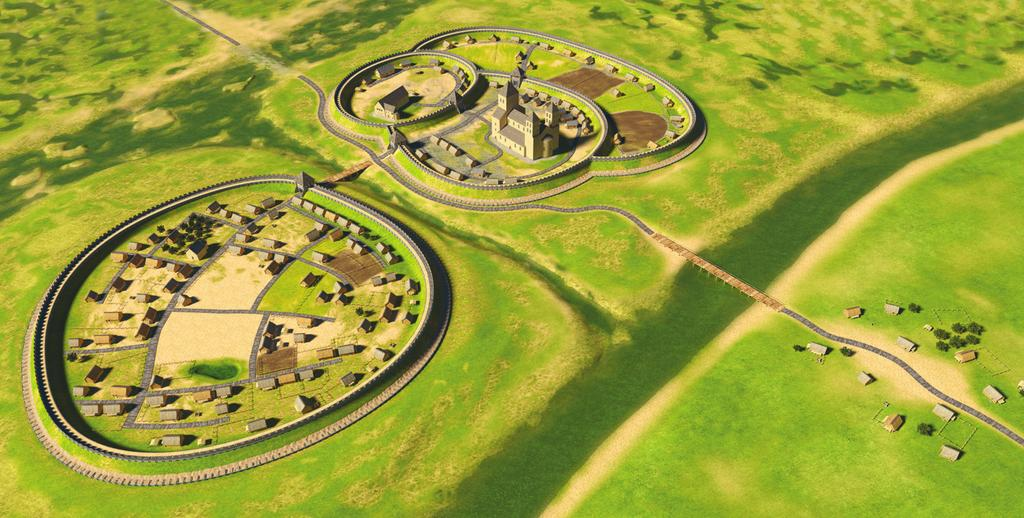
A visualization of the gród of Poznań, Poland, 10th century

Fortified strongholds (gords) appeared in significant numbers during the 9th century and were often found in the centre of a group of settlements. However, power centers probably appeared already in the second half of the 5th and first half of the 6th century, concentrated on the left and right bank of the Dnieper river, and persisted until the first third of the 7th century. Some were also on the Dniester river, and in general in Western Ukraine, Belarus and Eastern Poland.

The Slavs preferred to live in hard to reach places to avoid attack, as recorded in Maurice's Strategikon: "They live among nearly impenetrable forests, rivers, lakes, and marshes, and have made the exits from their settlements branch [out in] many directions because of the dangers they might face."

=== Food and agriculture ===
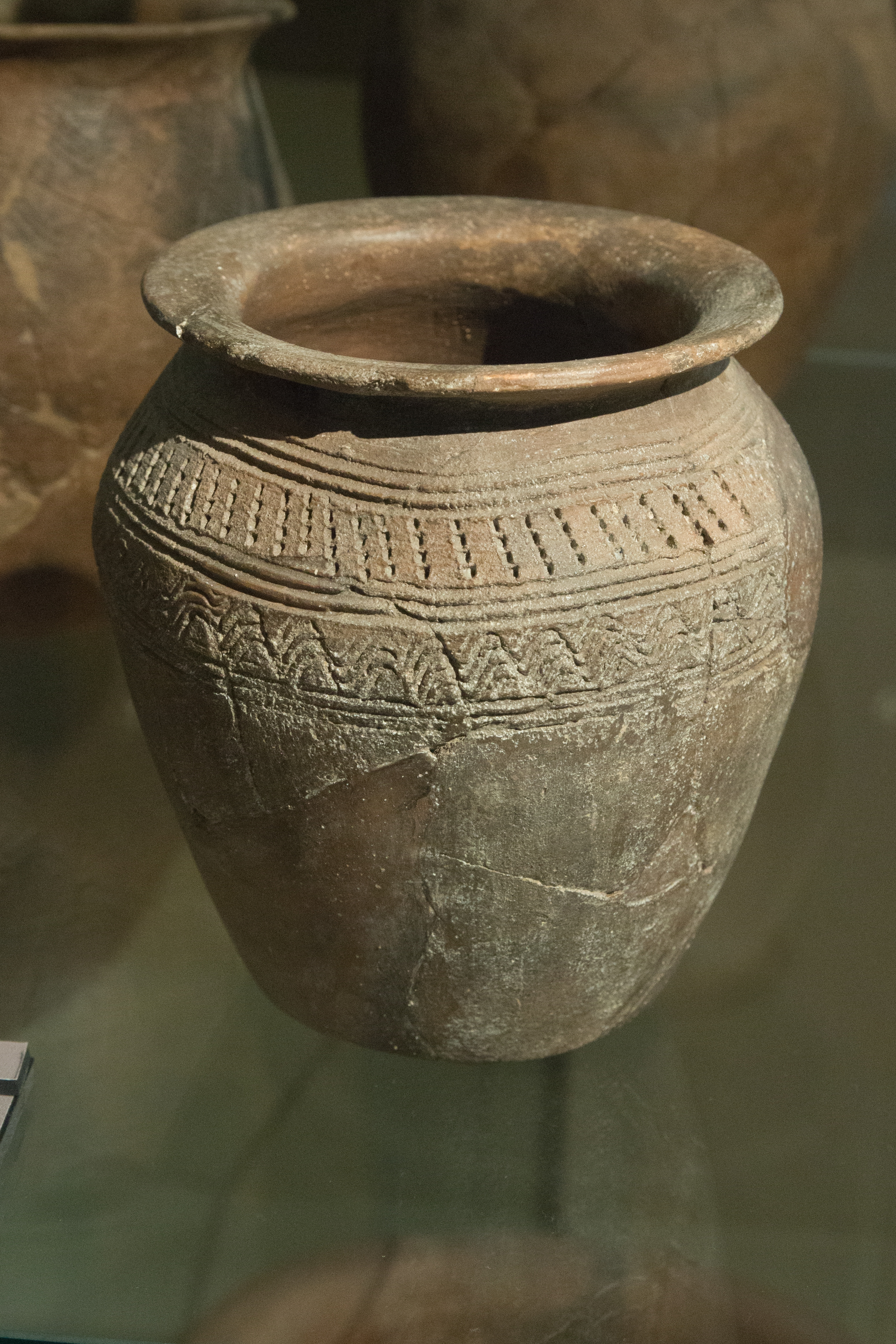
Slavic ceramic pottery vessel, c. 8th century AD

The Slavs practiced hunting, farming, herding and beekeeping. They often settled in valley bottoms with rich soil, along rivers to provide water for livestock. The early Slavs also had knowledge of crop rotation and developed a new sort of plow known as the moldboard plow, this plough was very efficient in breaking up the clay full soil of northern Europe, and it helped drastically increase the Slavic population. Other tools, common throughout the rest of Europe were also used, such as iron hoes, sickles, wooden spades and others. Some were made from wood. Selective breeding was also done. Animals in the forest were hunted, prey included boar, deer, hare, elk and occasionally bear. Beavers and marten were trapped for their fur.

When crops were ripe they were cut with sickles and threshing was then done with a wooden flail. The grain was then milled by stone querns, which were very valuable and difficult to come by. Cereal crops, wheat, millet and barley were common as they could thrive in even poor soil. Vegetables such as onions, carrots, radishes, turnip, parsnip, cucumber, cabbage, pea and beans were all grown in gardens. Herbs were mostly garlic and parsnip, hops were also grown for making beer. Fruit trees were cultivated in orchards, including cherry, apple, pear, plums and peaches. Walnuts were also loved.

Animal were tended, not only for meat, leather or milk but also to fertilize the soil. Several breeds of cattle were bred and kept in large herds, as draught animals and for meat, female cattle provided milk. Pigs were prized for their meat. Goats and sheep were more rare but still bred. Horses were very rarely eaten, mostly used as draught or riding animals. Fowl were also kept, especially ducks and geese.

Maurice's Strategikon states that they had numerous cattle and cultivated millet and buckwheat. Seemingly they had agriculture and livestock which could be easily transported and adapted, as Procopius recorded that "every man is constantly changing his place of abode".

"They sow during two seasons of the year, in summer and in spring, and harvest two crops. Their principal crop is millet... They refrain from eating chicken, asserting that it exacerbates erysipelas, but they eat beef and goose, both of which agree with them...Their drinks and wine are made out of honey." -Ibrahim Ibn Ya'qub

"They have a sort of wooden box, provided with holes, in which bees live and make their honey; in their language they are called the ulishaj. They collect around ten jars of honey from each box. They herd pigs as if they were sheep...They drink mead" -Ibn Rusta

=== Medicine ===
The ancient Slavs knew human anatomy well, which is evident from the existence of numerous old names for body parts. Due to the lack of sources, we do not know for sure what they suffered from, but it is assumed that they were plague, malaria and dysentery.The medicines they used were mostly of animal and plant origin. Less commonly, minerals, sulfur and salt were used for medicinal purposes. The Slavs cleansed themselves in log cabin saunas and bathed in rivers. The early medieval Jewish traveller Ibrahim ibn Yaqub wrote: "The cold even when it is intense, is healthful to them, but the heat destroys them. They are unable to travel to the country of the Lombards because of the heat."

=== Craftsmanship ===
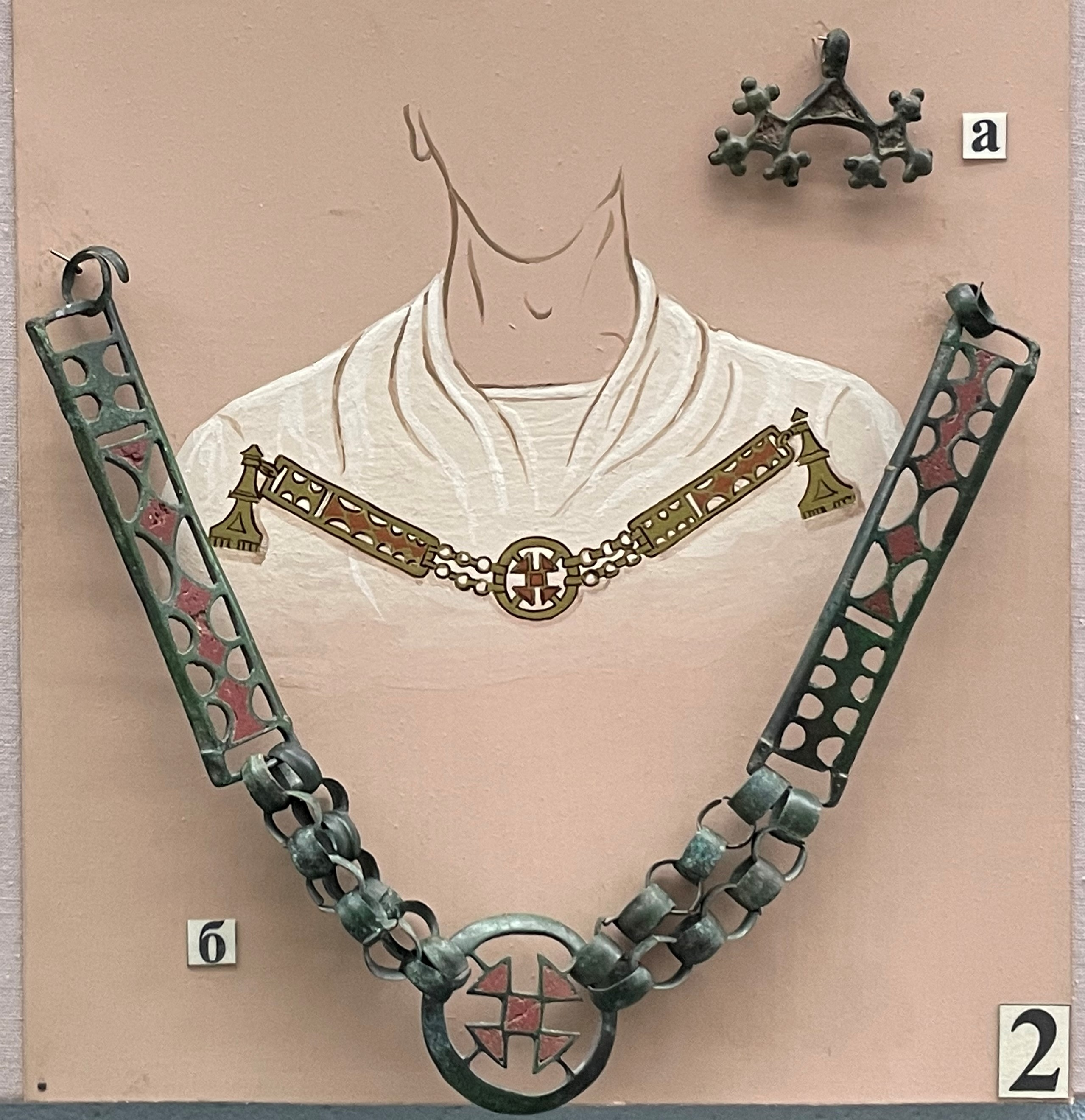
Slavic necklace, Kiev culture, 3rd–5th centuries AD

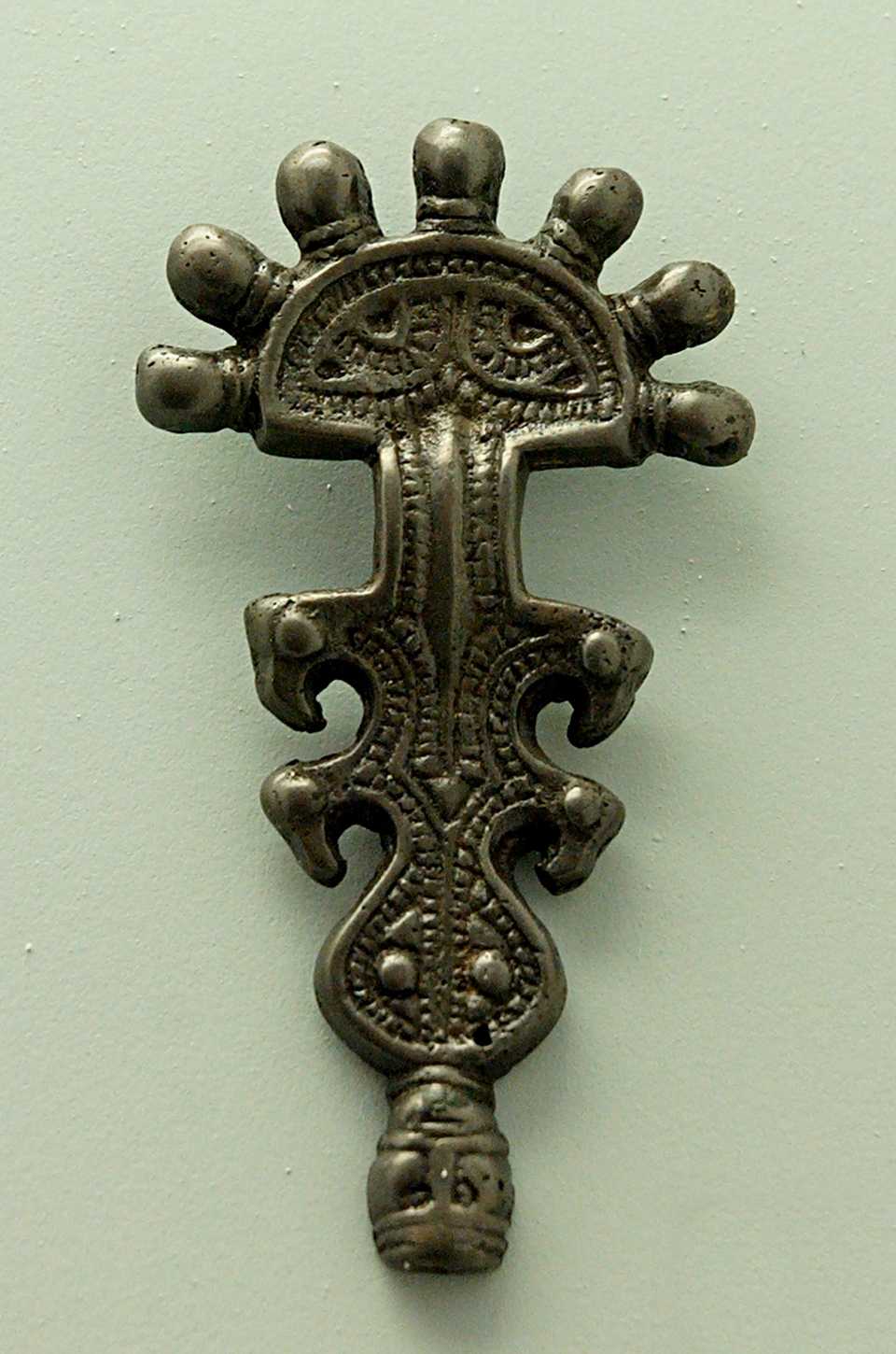
Slavic fibula brooch, c. 7th century AD

Wood, leather, metal and ceramic work were all skillfully practiced by the Early Slavs. Pottery was made by craftsmen, or women, possibly in domestic workshops. Clay was mixed with coarse material, such as sand, crushed rock, to improve the qualities. Clay was worked by hand and roughly smoothed after completion, clay vessels also made with assistance of pottery wheels. After they were dried they were baked at a low temperature in bone-fire kilns. Pottery was produced not only by craftsmen, but also ordinary people as it did not require extensive practice, other crafts however were produced by professional craftsmen.

Metalworking was very important, as it was required to make tools and weapons. Iron was needed by every tribe, and it was produced by smiths using local ore, which was primarily bog ore. Once the ore had been turned into usable iron and slag removed, it was made into bars. Smiths made many types of products such as knives, tools, decorative items as well as weapons, which were not always made by separate weapon smiths. Broken tools were reforged, as iron was a valuable resource.

Houses, as well as their inside fittings and everyday items were made from wood. Carved bowls, vessels and beautifully made dippers were common in most homes. Leather and textiles, made of both linen and wool were made into carpets, blankets, overcoats and other clothing. Spindlewhorls were used to make thread in the home. Glass beads were crafted, and were often used as trade goods.

=== Clothing ===
Most of the knowledge we have on Early Slavic clothing comes from iconographic sources and cemeteries. Although clothing differed according to region, season of year and social status, a general picture can be reconstructed.

Men wore long sleeved tunics made of linen or wool, extending to about the knee; under these, breeches were worn. Wool cloaks were sometimes worn over the tunic, fastened at the right shoulder leaving the right arm free. Cloaks were occasionally also made of leather and lined with fur or other material. Hats and mittens were worn for the winter, some trimmed with fur. Leather boots and shoes were also worn by both men and women, as well as a belt carrying a knife and whetstone for sharpening.

Some women wore long patterned dresses made from linen, sometimes with an apron tied over the dress. Dresses or tunics were sometimes made from one piece. Unmarried women wore their hair braided or loose, but covered it after they were wedded. Ornaments and jewelry such as beads and earrings and twisted wire bracelets were also worn, especially by wealthier women.

=== Musical instruments ===
The Slavs had many musical instruments as recorded in historical chronicles:

"They have different kinds of lutes, pan pipes and flutes a cubit long. Their lutes have eight strings. They drink mead. They play their instruments during the incineration of their dead and claim that their rejoicing attests the mercy of the Lord to the dead." -Ibn Rusta

"They have different kinds of wind and string instruments. They have a wind instrument more than two cubits long, and an eight-stringed instrument whose sounding board is flat, not convex." -Ibrahim Ibn Ya'qub

Theophylact Simocatta mentioned of Slavs bearing lyres: "Lyres were their baggage"

=== Marriage ===
Capturing wives and exogamy were traditions among the tribes and continued until the early medieval era. However, on some occasions in Bohemia and Ukraine, it was women who chose the spouse. The 12th-century Primary Chronicle recorded that the Vyatichi, Radimichs and Severians did not have monogamous marriages but practiced polygamy (polygyny) instead.

Fornication had a sentence in Pagan Slavs that was described as capital punishment by travelers, Ibn-Fadlan: "Men and women go to the river and bathe together naked... but they do not fornicate and if anyone would be guilty of it, no matter who is he and she... he and she would be pinked by pole-axe... then they hang out each part both of them on a tree", Gardizi: "If someone makes fornication, he or she would be killed, without accepting any apologies".

The Byzantine Emperor Maurice wrote: "Their women are more sensitive than any others in the world. When, for example, their husband dies, many look upon it as their own death and freely smother themselves, not wanting to continue their lives as widows."

=== Law ===
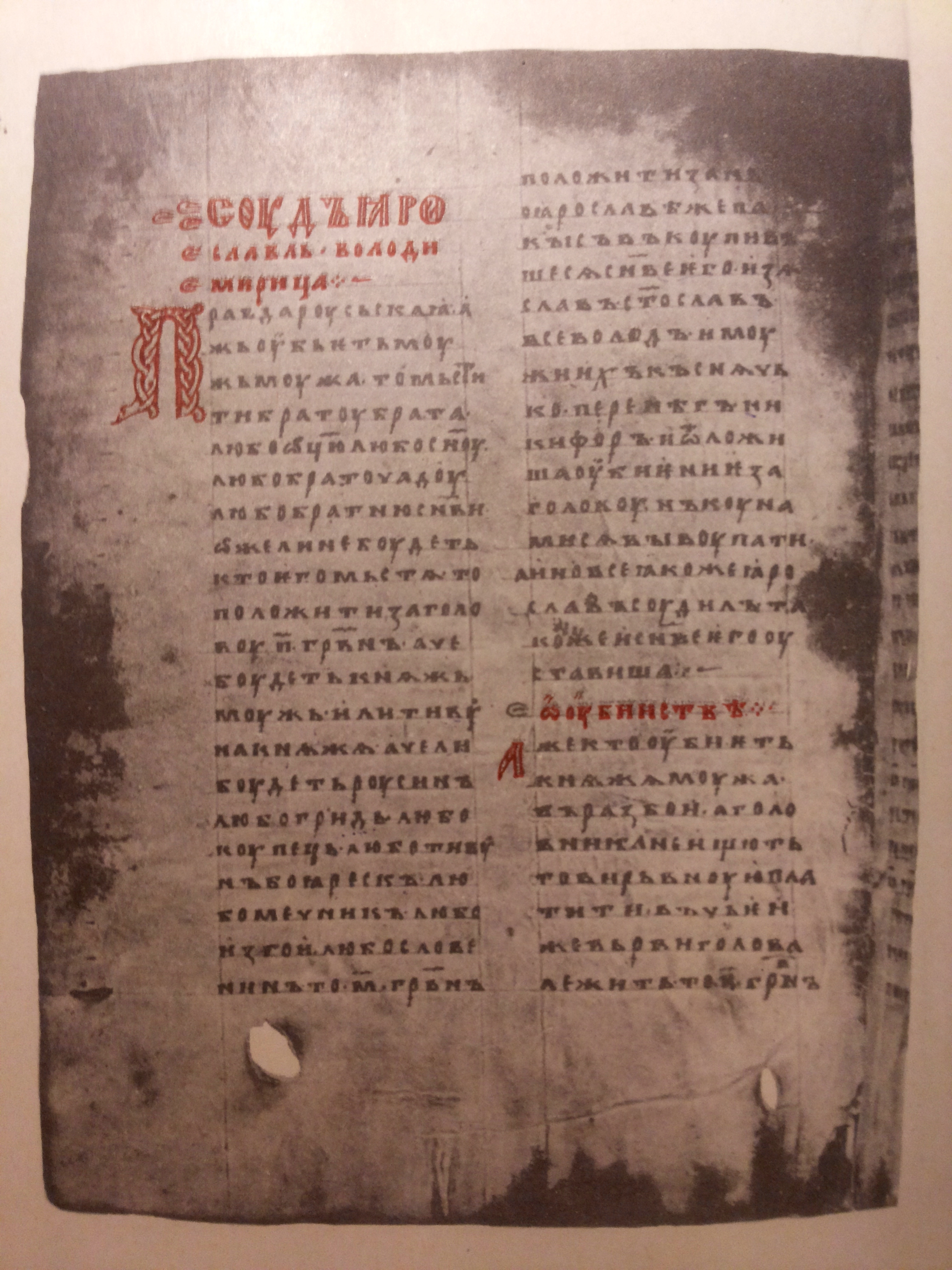
First page of the oldest surviving copy of Russkaya Pravda (old Rus law) (Vast edition) from Synodic Kormchaia of 1282 (Novgorod)

Rus law was based on Early Slavic customary law, which was partially recorded in the Rus-Byzantine treaties. However the Early Slavs did not have written laws, but relied on customs that dictated what was acceptable and not. The East Slavs did not have written law until the rule of Yaroslav the Wise. One such customary law was the law of hospitality, which was very important to the tribal Slavs. If a tribe mistreated any guest, they would be attacked by a neighbouring tribe for their dishonour.

Ibn Rusta wrote of Slavic law in c 903–918: "The ruler levies fixed taxes every year. Every man must supply one of his daughter's gowns. If he has a son, his clothing must be offered. If he has no children, he gives one of his wife's robes. In this country thieves are strangled or exiled to Jira [Yura by the Urals?], the region most remote from this principality."

=== Warfare ===
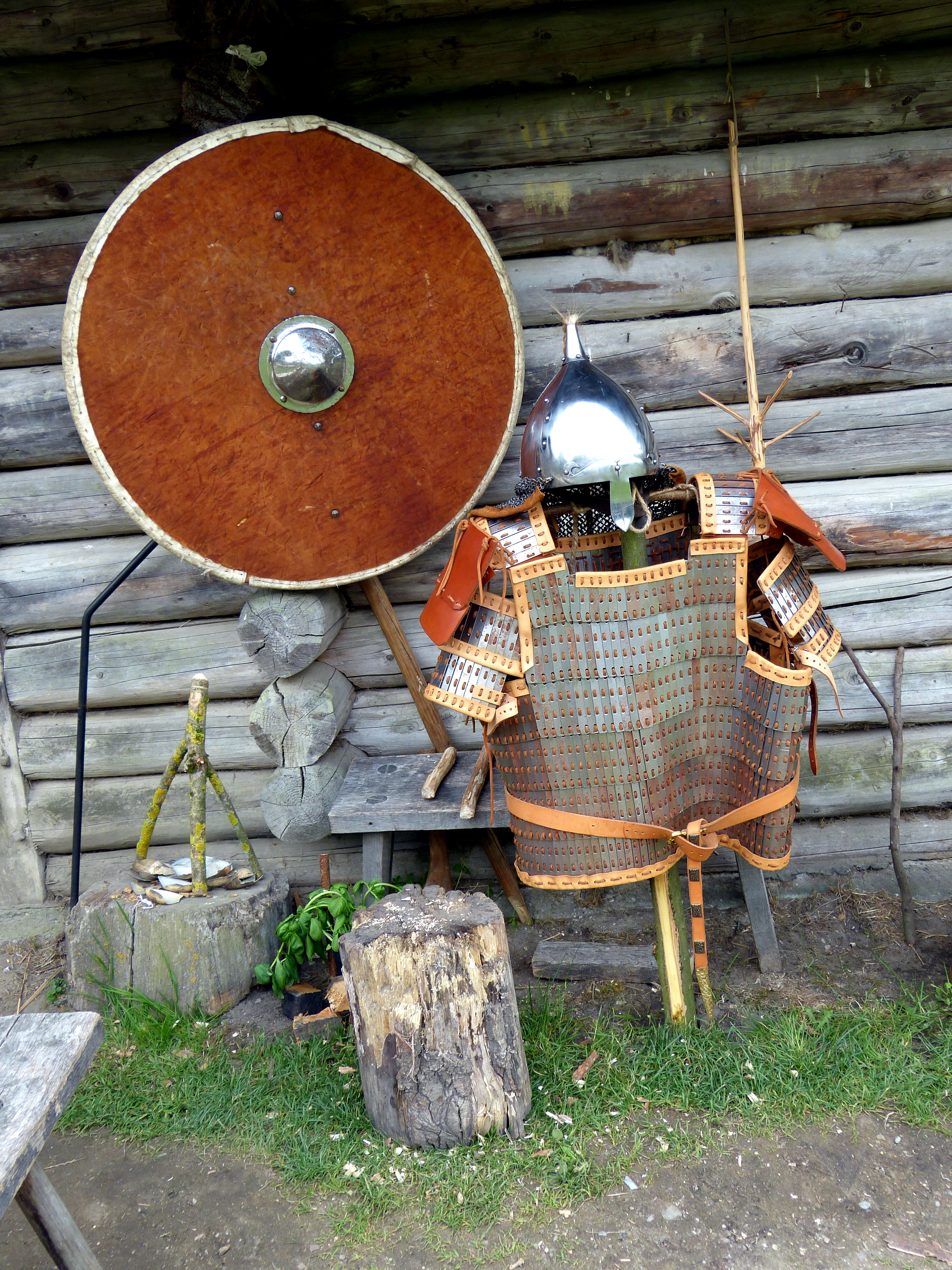
Replica of early Slavic armour (ca. 10th century)

Our understanding of Early Slavic warfare is based on both the writings of ancient authors, and archaeological discoveries which mostly confirmed ancient accounts. Early barbarian warrior bands, typically numbering 200 or less, were intended for fast penetration into enemy territory and an equally-quick withdrawal. The Slavs favoured ambush and guerrilla tactics, preferring to fight in dense woodland, gorges or marsh. However, victories in the open, sieges and hand-to-hand fighting were also achieved. They often attacked their enemy's flank, and were cunning in devising stratagems. The Slavs also used siege engines, such as siege towers and ladders, as described by Procopius and St. Demetrius. Weapons were usually spears, javelins and bows and arrows. Swords and body armour were rare and reserved for chiefs and their inner circle of warriors. Shields were round in shape with a central boss grip in the middle. Axes and slings were also in use.

==== Description ====
Procopius and Pseudo-Maurice described that the South Slavs did not use armour and lacked advanced weapons, being armed with spears, small light shields and bows. Ibn Rusta, regarding Slavs in Central-Eastern Europe, wrote: "They have very few horses...Their weapons are javelins, shields and lances...They obey a chief whom they call the Župan and carry out his orders...Their supreme lord, however, is called 'chief of chiefs'...this king has many effective and finely woven coats of mail...The Župan is his lieutenant." Procopius, Pseudo-Maurice, Leo the Wise and John Kaminiates mentioned that the Slavs were among the most skillful in archery, usually using poisoned arrows.

Although the Slavs often fought on foot, they were also proficient cavalry fighters, as described by historical sources. Procopius wrote that in 536 some 1,600 horsemen of Slavs, Huns and Antes arrived in Italy as Byzantine reinforcement to rescue Belisarius, serving also as horse archers. In 595, some Slavic or Antes horsemen captured Byzantine scouts on the Lower Danube. In their dealings with the Sarmatians, Huns, Bulgars and Avars, the Slavs may have become skilled light horsemen. The archaeological findings of weaponry and horse trappings confirm influence of Asian steppe nomads on Slavic cavalry, being in fashion more Asian than European.

By the mid-6th century the Slavs had skill and knowledge about naval warfare, building rafts and monoxyles. These small, primitive vessels were used primarily for transportation, and they carried them also on land, giving them mobility on both land and sea.

Byzantine writers mention several Slavic mercenaries who distinguished themselves as soldiers; Dabrageza (an Antae) and his subordinate Elmingiros (a Hun), Svarun (a Slav), and the impostor Chilbudius. Procopius also noted the "bravery of an Antes' squad, especially their skill to fight in rough terrain". Some individuals managed to distinguish themselves as Byzantine officials and military commanders between the 8th and 10th century, like Nicetas I of Constantinople, Thomas the Slav, Andrew the Scythian and Nicetas Rentakios.

Menander Protector mentions a Slavic chief Daurentius (circa 577–579), who slew an Avar envoy of Khagan Bayan I for asking the Slavs to accept the suzerainty of the Avars; Daurentius declined and is reported as saying: "Others do not conquer our land, we conquer theirs – so it shall always be for us as long as there are wars and weapons".

==== Military organization ====
Procopius noted that the Slavs attacked without military formation, but his description of Slavic archaic weaponry and military strategy is probably from a biased and misunderstood viewpoint, as it would have been highly improbable for poorly armed and organized military groups to manage successful invasions, plundering and conquests against the Byzantine empire, as well as overthrowing the Avars and resisting Frankish expansion. Initially of lighter armament, a second phase of Slavic armament can be observed by the end of the 6th and in the 7th century, including heavier defensive armaments for more professional warriors, particularly in Southeastern Europe.

Historical accounts show that military leaders and a developing class of professional warriors (who were also hired as mercenaries) were already in existence before the mid-6th century. The egalitarian society was steadily transforming into a stable military-social hierarchy. Archaeological findings associated with professional warriors and military leaders were particularly found in Southeastern and Eastern Europe, and Slavic cultures (of Prague, Ipotești–Cândești, Penkovka and Kolochin). In the Prague culture the elite artefacts mostly imitate or traditionally originate from the Avars, while other Slavic cultures have Byzantine and Roman-Germanic (Lombards) influences.

In 550, what was considered a small Slavic military group, consisted of some 3,000 men who invaded Thrace, winning several open battles against Byzantines and conquering fortresses. Mentions of larger Slavic detachments (as army, mass, multitude), and Byzantine army loses (even when having 15,000 troops and being "outnumbered" by the Slavs), also point toward a well organized and numerous Slavic population.

=== Writing ===
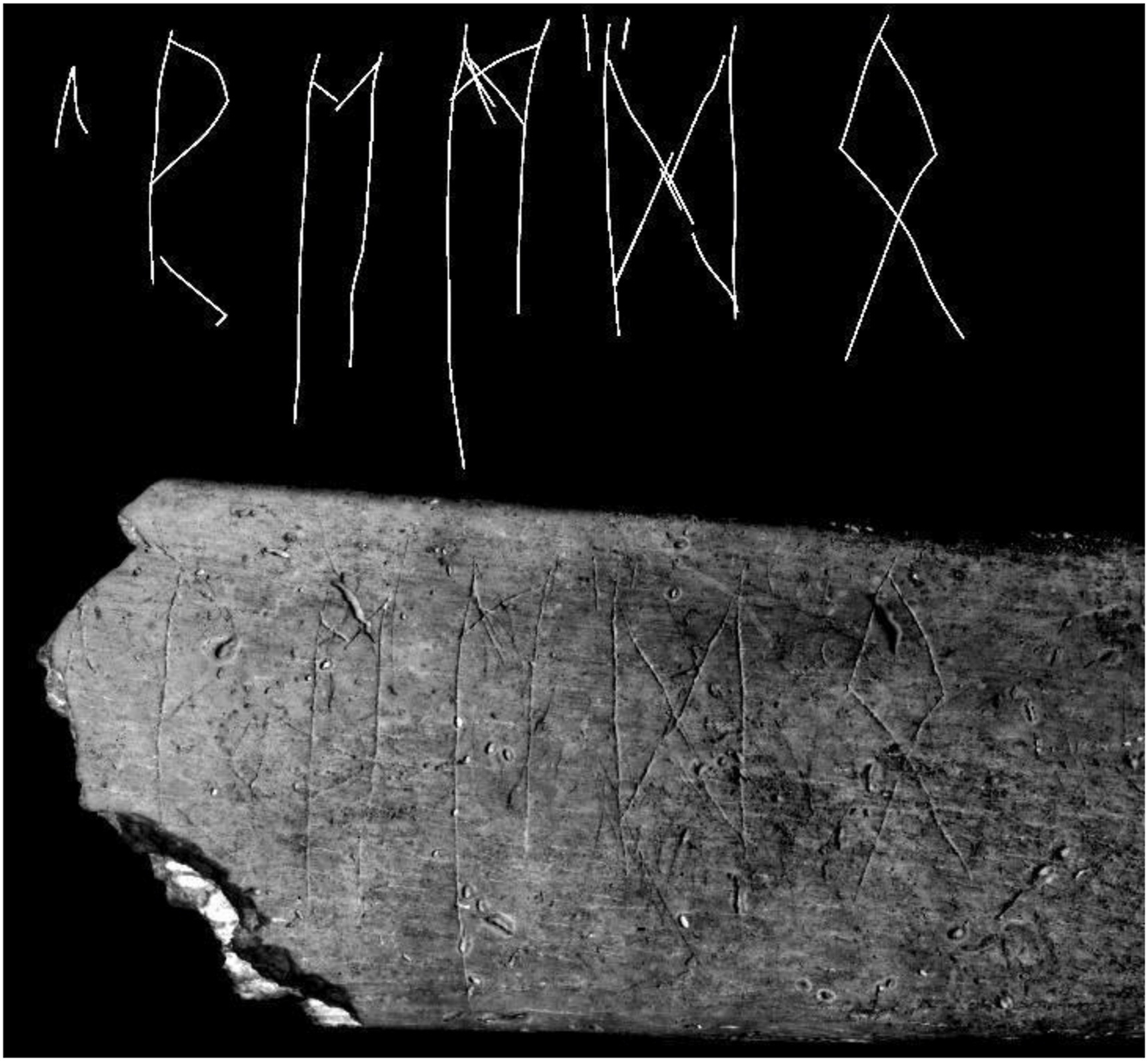
The bone with elder futhark runic inscription found in the early Slavic settlement in Lány (near Břeclav) in the Czech Republic.

The existence of writing among the Early Slavs is a disputed topic. The Slavs passed down their stories and legends orally like most other tribal peoples in Europe. But in addition to this, a runic script was possibly used.

The 9th-century Bulgarian writer Chernorizets Hrabar, in his work "An Account of Letters", briefly mentions that, before becoming Christian, Slavs used a system of strokes and incisions or tallies and sketches: "Before, the Slavs did not have their own books, but counted and divined by means of strokes and incisions, being pagan. Having become Christian, they had to make do with the use of Roman and Greek letters without order [unsystematically], but how can one write [Slavic] well with Greek letters... (Note: In this place are listed eleven examples of Slavic words, such as живѣтъ /živět/ "life", which can hardly be written using the unadapted Roman or Greek letters (i.e. without diacritics changing their sound-values).) and thus it was for many years."

=== Symbols ===
Gromoviti znaci; symbols associated with Perun. Identical symbols were discovered on Slavic pottery of 4th century Chernyakhov culture.

Early Slavs had many symbols and pictures representing concepts, beliefs and Gods. It is considered that in "no other culture do we encounter them in such numbers, and more importantly, in such diversity, as in the culture of the Slavs", possibly due to influence of steppe and Roman people. They had many types of swastikas and similar symbols, such as the kolovrat (meaning spinning wheel). The swastika, both right-sided and left-sided, was found in the Zarubintsy culture, Kyiv culture and Proto-Slavic archaeological cultures. The kolovrat symbolized the sun, and the ever going cycle of life, death and birth. It was often carved on markers near the graves of fallen Slavs to represent eternal life.

Gromovitit Znaci, were symbols associated with Perun, the Slavic thunder and sky god. Early Slavic homes often had the symbols carved into a beam to protect them from lightning. The circular shape of the Gromoviti symbolize ball lightning. Such symbols were also found on Slavic pottery from the 4th century. Another symbol associated with Perun is the Perunika, which resmebles a six-petalled rose. Today, it is the name for a flower in some Slavic languages.

The hands of God were another ancient symbol, associated with the god Svarog.

Ancient symbols such as these are still sometimes shown on clothing and the like, especially Russia. Many samples are described on the instance of a women's folk costume at the Meshchera Lowlands. Modern Rodonovers have developed some new symbols, that were not used by the Early Slavs, but many were.

=== Burial practices ===
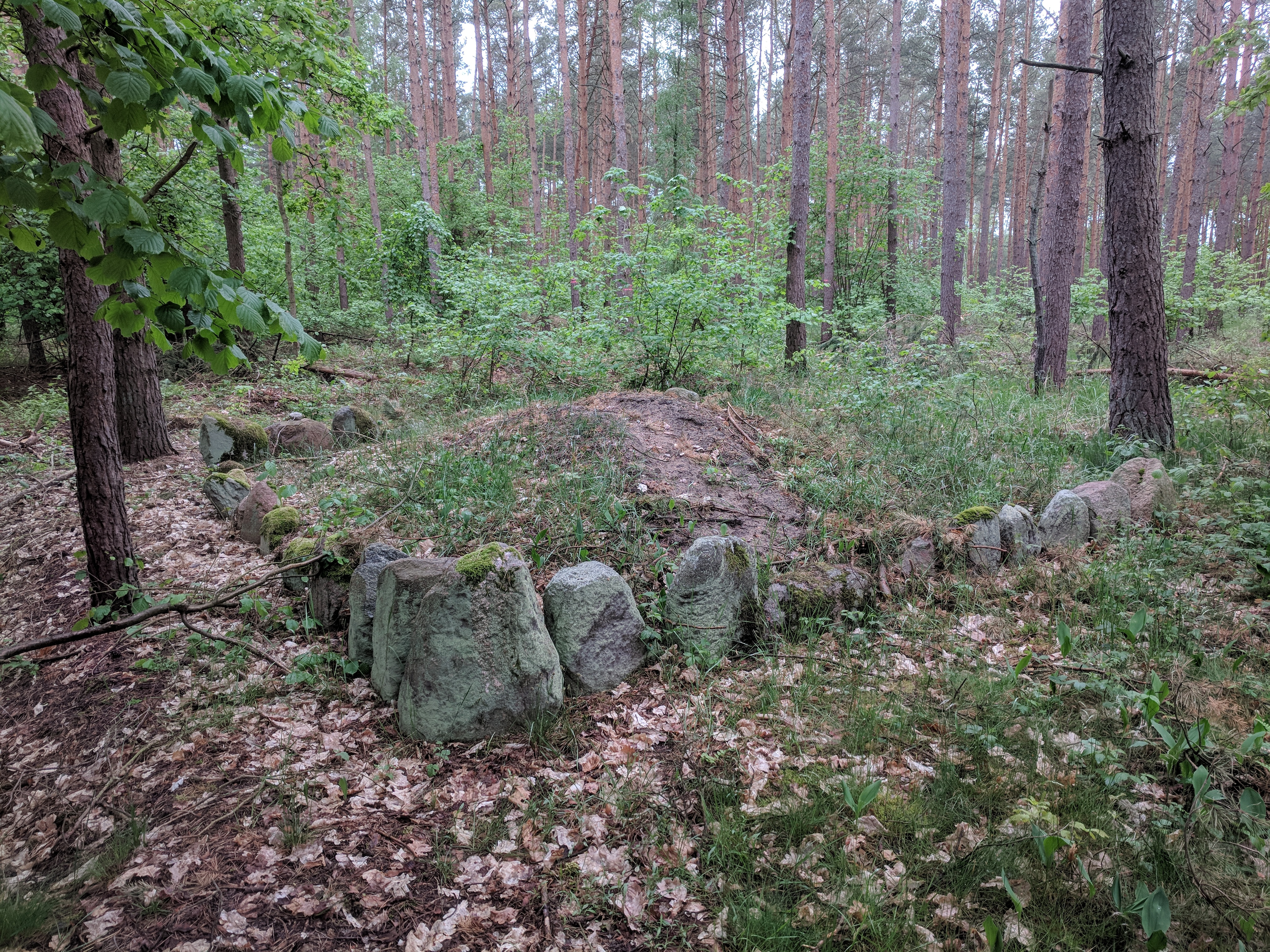
A square Slavic burial mound in Löcknitz, Germany

The Slavs burned their dead. Although the Slavic funeral pyre was seen as a means of freeing the soul from the body rapidly, visibly and publicly, archaeological evidence suggests that the South Slavs quickly adopted the burial practices of their post-Roman Balkan neighbours.

"They burn their dead...The day after the funeral of a man, after he has been burned, they collect the ashes and put them in an urn, which is buried on a hill. After a year, they place twenty hives, more or less, on the hill. The family gathers and eats and drinks there and then everyone goes home." -Ibn Rusta

=== Religion ===
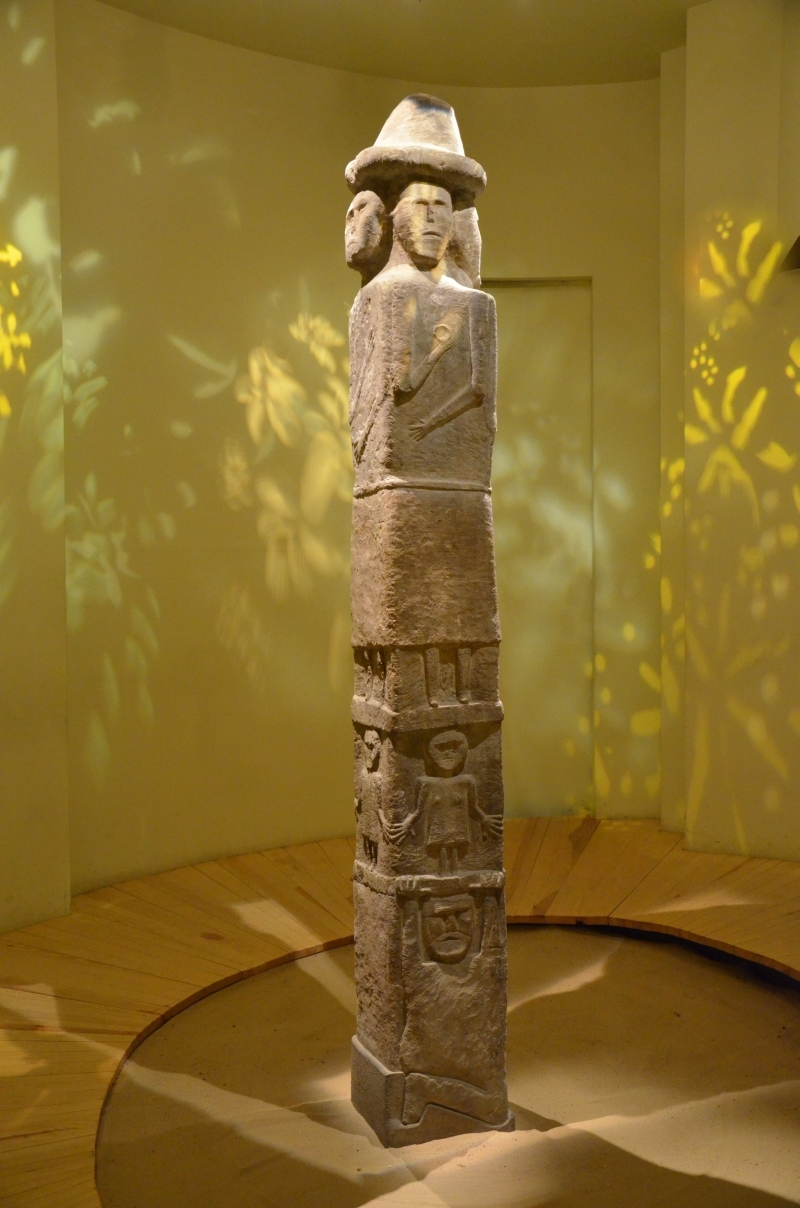
The Zbruch Idol

Little is known about Slavic religion before the Christianization of Bulgaria and of Kievan Rus. After Christianization, Slavic authorities destroyed many records of the old religion. Some evidence remains in apocryphal and devotional texts, the etymology of Slavic religious terms and the Primary Chronicle.

Ancestor worship was an important part of the pre-Christian Slavic religion.

Early Slavic religion was relatively uniform: animistic, anthropomorphic and inspired by nature. The Slavs developed cults around natural objects, such as springs, trees or stones, out of respect for the spirit (or demon) within. Slavic pre-Christian religion was originally polytheistic, with no organised pantheon. Although the earliest Slavs seemed to have a weak concept of God, the concept evolved into a form of monotheism in which a "supreme god [ruled] in heaven over the others". There is no evidence of a belief in fate or predestination.

Slavic paganism was syncretistic and combined and shared with other religions. Linguistic evidence indicates that part of Slavic paganism developed when the Balts and Slavs shared a common language since pre-Christian Slavic beliefs contained elements also found in Baltic religions. After the Slavic and the Baltic languages diverged, the early Slavs interacted with Iranian peoples and incorporated elements of Iranian spirituality. Early Iranian and Slavic supreme gods were considered givers of wealth, unlike the supreme thunder gods of other European religions. Both Slavs and Iranians had demons, with names from similar linguistic roots (Iranian Daêva and Slavic Divŭ) and a concept of dualism: good and evil.

Pre-Christian Slavic spirits and demons could be entities in their own right or spirits of the dead and were associated with home or nature. Forest spirits, entities in their own right, were venerated as the counterparts of home spirits, which were usually related to ancestors. Demons and spirits were good or evil, which suggests that the Slavs had a dualistic cosmology and are known to have revered them with sacrifices and gifts. Spirits included Leshy the spirit of the forest, Domovoy spirit of the home, Rusalka the female spirit of waters, Rarog the Slavic variant of phoenix, and other creature such as vilas, vampires and Baba Yaga or Roga.

Although evidence of pre-Christian Slavic worship is scarce (suggesting that it was aniconic), religious sites and idols are most plentiful in Ukraine and Poland. Slavic temples and indoor places of worship are rare since outdoor places of worship are more common, especially in Kievan Rus'. The outdoor cultic sites were often on hills and included ringed ditches. Indoor shrines existed: "Early Russian sources... refer to pagan shrines or altars known as kapishcha" and were small, enclosed structures with an altar inside. One was found in Kiev, surrounded by the bones of sacrificed animals. Some Pagan temples were documented as destroyed during Christianization, many places of worship ware remodeled into churches.

Records of pre-Christian Slavic priests, like the pagan temples, appeared later. Although no early evidence of Slavic pre-Christian priests has been found, the prevalence of sorcerers and magicians after Christianization suggests that the pre-Christian Slavs had religious leaders. Slavic pagan priests were believed to commune with the gods, to predict the future and to prepare for religious rituals. The pagan priests, or magicians (known as volkhvy by the Rus' people), resisted Christianity after Christianization. The Primary Chronicle describes a campaign against Christianity in 1071 during a famine. The volkhvy were well-received nearly 100 years after Christianization, which suggested that pagan priests had an esteemed position in 1071 and in pre-Christian times.

== Later history ==
=== Christianization ===
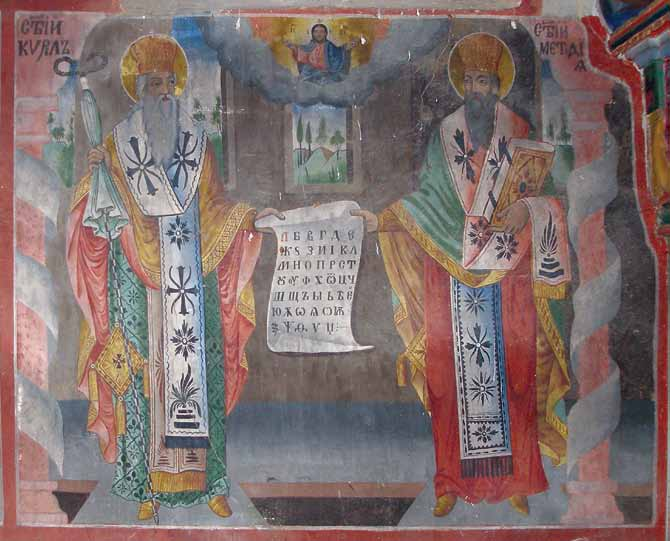
Fresco of Saints Cyril and Methodius, both Byzantine Christian missionaries to the Southern Slavs

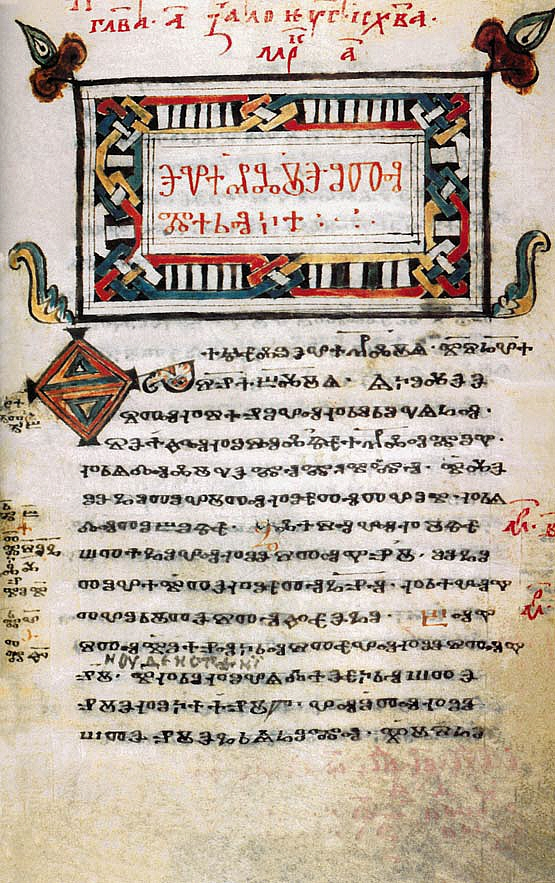
Page of the Gospel of Mark from Codex Zographensis, an Old Church Slavonic manuscript written in Glagolitic script

Christianization began in the 7th century and was not completed until the second half of the 12 century. Later, as the Byzantine Empire reclaimed some of the areas of the Balkans occupied by Slavs, slight parts population of Slavs were Hellenised, including conversion to Eastern Orthodox Christianity, for example under the reign of Nicephorus I (802–811). However, the most significant missionary work was in the mid-ninth century. The Christianization of Bulgaria was made official in 864, during the reign of Knyaz Boris I during shifting political alliances both with the Byzantine Empire and the kingdom of the East Franks and the communication with the Pope.

Because of the Bulgarian Empire's strategic position, the Greek East and the Latin West wanted their people to adhere to their liturgies and to ally with them politically. After overtures from each side, Boris aligned with Constantinople and secured an autocephalous Bulgarian national church in 870, the first for the Slavs. In 918/919, the Bulgarian Patriarchate became the fifth autocephalous Eastern Orthodox patriarchate, after the patriarchates of Constantinople, Alexandria, Antioch and Jerusalem. That status was officially recognised by the Patriarchate of Constantinople in 927. The Bulgarian Empire developed into the cultural and literary centre of Slavic Europe. The development of the Cyrillic script at the Preslav Literary School, which was declared official in Bulgaria in 893, was also declared the official liturgy in Old Church Slavonic, also called Old Bulgarian.

Map of Europe in 814 showing the distribution of the Slavic tribes and the First Bulgarian Empire in relation to the Carolingian Empire and the Byzantine Empire

Although there is some evidence of early Christianization of the East Slavs, Kievan Rus' either remained largely pagan or relapsed into paganism before the baptism of Vladimir the Great in the 980s. The Christianization of Poland began with the Catholic baptism of Duke Mieszko I in 966. Slavic paganism persisted into the 12th century in Pomerania, which began to be Christianized after the creation of the Duchy of Pomerania as part of the Holy Roman Empire in 1121. The process was mostly completed by the Wendish Crusade in 1147. The final stronghold of Slavic paganism was the Rani, with a temple to their god Svetovid on Cape Arkona, which was taken in a campaign by Valdemar I of Denmark in 1168.

=== Medieval states ===
After Christianisation, the Slavs established a number of kingdoms, or feudal principalities, which persisted throughout the High Middle Ages. The First Bulgarian Empire was founded in 681 as an alliance between the ruling Bulgars and the numerous Slavs in Lower Moesia. Not long after the Slavic incursion, Scythia Minor was once again invaded, this time by the Bulgars, under Khan Asparukh. Their horde was a remnant of Old Great Bulgaria, an extinct tribal confederacy that was north of the Black Sea in what is now Ukraine. Asparukh attacked Byzantine territories in Eastern Moesia and conquered its Slavic tribes in 680. A peace treaty with the Byzantine Empire was signed in 681 and marked the foundation of the First Bulgarian Empire. The minority Bulgars formed a close-knit ruling caste.

The South Slavs established also the Duchy of Croatia in the early 7-8th century (Kingdom of Croatia since 925) and short-lived Duchy of Lower Pannonia. Roughly in the same time Principality of Serbia (later Grand Principality and Kingdom of Serbia), while Banate of Bosnia emerged from the 10th century by merging localities called župas, which were remnants of Early Christianity ecclesiastical divisions. Duklja, Zachlumia, Pagania, Travunia and Kanalites similarly started emerging in the south. The West Slavs were distributed in Samo's Empire, which was the first Slavic state to form in the west, followed by the Great Moravia and, after its decline, the Kingdom of Poland, the Obotritic confederation (now eastern Germany) the Principality of Nitra (modern Slovakia) a vassal of the Kingdom of Hungary, and the Duchy of Bohemia (now the Czech Republic).

After the 1054 death of Yaroslav the Wise and the breakup of Kievan Rus', the East Slavs fragmented into a number of principalities from which Muscovy would emerge after 1300 as the most powerful one. The western principalities of the former Kievan Rus' were absorbed by the Grand Duchy of Lithuania.

== See also ==
- Bibliography of the history of the Early Slavs and Rus'
- East Slavs
- West Slavs
- South Slavs
