= First Christianization of the Rus' people =

Christians and Pagans, a painting by Sergei Ivanov.

The Christianization of the Rus' people is supposed to have begun in the 860s and was the first stage in the process of Christianization of the East Slavs which continued well into the 11th century. Despite its historical and cultural significance, records detailing the event are hard to come by, and it seems to have been forgotten by the time of Vladimir's Baptism of Kiev in the 980s.

The most authoritative source on the first Christianization of the Rus' is an encyclical letter of Patriarch Photius of Constantinople, datable to early 867. Referencing the Rus'-Byzantine War of 860, Photius informs the Oriental patriarchs and bishops that, after the Bulgars turned to Christ in 863, the Rus' followed suit so zealously that he found it prudent to send to their land a bishop.

Byzantine historians, starting with the continuation of Theophanes the Confessor, assumed that the Rus' raid against Constantinople in 860 was a Byzantine success and attributed the presumed victory to the Intercession of the Theotokos. This conviction dictated the following interpretation: awed by the miracles they witnessed under the walls of the imperial capital and grief-stricken at the disaster that befell them, the Rus' sent envoys to Photius and asked him to send a bishop to their land.

According to Constantine VII, who authored a biography of his grandfather, Basil the Macedonian, it was his ancestor who persuaded the Rus' to abandon their pagan ways. Constantine attributes the conversion to Basil and to Patriarch Ignatius, rather than to their predecessors, Michael III and Photius. He narrates how the Byzantines galvanized the Rus' into conversion by their persuasive words and rich presents, including gold, silver, and precious tissues. He also repeats a traditional story that the pagans were particularly impressed by a miracle: a gospel book thrown by the archbishop (sic) into an oven was not damaged by fire.

Constantine's account precipitated a long-term dispute over whether the 9th-century Christianization of the Rus' went through two stages. One school of thought postulates that there was only one Christianization: wishing to glorify his ancestor, Constantine simply ascribed to Basil the missionary triumphs of his predecessor, Michael III.

On the other hand, Constantine Zuckerman argues that, in response to the initial request of the Rus', Photius (and Michael III) sent to the Rus' Khaganate a simple bishop. The pagans felt slighted at the low rank of the prelate and their Christian zeal evaporated. In September 867, Michael was assassinated by Basil, who (together with a new patriarch, Ignatius) sent to the Rus' an archbishop who propped up the religious fervor of the local leaders with rich presents. Parenthetically, the contemporaneous Christianization of Bulgaria was likewise effected in two stages: the Bulgars were offended when a simple bishop arrived to their capital from Constantinople and requested Pope Nicholas I to send them a higher-ranking church official. Such considerations were an important matter of political prestige. This pattern has parallels with the stories of Frankish historians about the multiple "baptisms" of the Norsemen, whose true intention was to get hold of the rich gifts accompanying the Christianization rituals.

The date and rationale for the Christianization are also shrouded in controversy. Grigory Litavrin views the event as "a formal and diplomatic act making it easier to obtain advantageous agreements with the ruler of the Christian state." Zuckerman argues that Ignatius sent his archbishop to Rus' in about 870, while Dmitry Obolensky inclines to accept 874 as the date of the definitive Christianization. Zuckerman further reasons that the Christianization of both Bulgaria and Rus' was triggered by the adoption of Judaism by their chief enemy, Khazaria, in the late 8th or early 9th century.

== Other primary sources ==
Although Byzantine sources provide the most detailed account of the 9th-century Christianization of the Rus', the contemporary Muslim authors seem to corroborate their evidence. Ibn Khordadbeh, when describing the Rus' in the 880s, notes that "they style themselves as Christians". The phrasing suggests that he did not take these claims seriously. Al-Marwazi (died after 869) reports that the Rus' abandoned their wild pagan ways and raids, settling into Christianity in 912 AD.

The Primary Chronicle posits Olga of Kiev (died 969) as the first Christian in Rus'. However, the Rus'-Byzantine Treaty (945), concluded during the reign of Olga's predecessor Igor and extensively quoted in the Primary Chronicle, mentions that some of the Rus' envoys who signed the treaty were Christians. Furthermore, the chronicle admits that the collegiate church of Saint Elijah existed in Kiev as early as 944, "for many Varangians and Khazars were Christians". It is not clear why the authors of the Primary Chronicle, who faithfully followed George Hamartolus in other details, chose to omit the very mention of Photius's efforts at Christianizing the country. In order to explain this conspicuous silence, Boris Rybakov constructed an intricate conspiracy theory, suggesting that Mstislav the Great (Grand Prince of Kiev (ruled 1125–1132) and supposedly a pro-Scandinavian and anti-Byzantine ruler) deliberately ordered the removal of the account of Askold's Christianization.

Late medieval Russian sources (such as the Nikon Chronicle of the 16th century) knew of the Byzantine account of the 9th-century Christianization and attempted to reconcile it with the traditional version of Vladimir's conversion of Kiev in 992. In the ensuing confusion, Vladimir and Photius were sometimes represented as contemporaries. The name of the first "metropolitan" of Rus' was given as either Michael or Leon. These sources connect the first Christianization with the name of Askold, a Kievan ruler whose assassination Oleg orchestrated in 882.

Since the Byzantines believed that the Rus' had been converted in the 9th century, they treated them as a Christian nation and failed to record the second Christianization of the country under Vladimir in 988. (Parenthetically, no foreign source, barring Yahya of Antioch (died ca. 1066), mentions Vladimir's conversion in the 980s.) In the inventory of Orthodox bishoprics compiled under Leo VI (reigned 886 to 912), the see of Rus' ranks sixty-first. In the list compiled during Constantine VII's reign (913-959), the see of Rus' holds the 60th position. The Life of Saint Cyril (Vita Cyrilli) reports that, when passing through Crimea on his way to Khazaria, the Apostle of the Slavs found in Chersonesos a Bible written in the Rus' language, possibly indicating the existence of a vernacular written tradition as early as the 9th century.

== The outcome ==
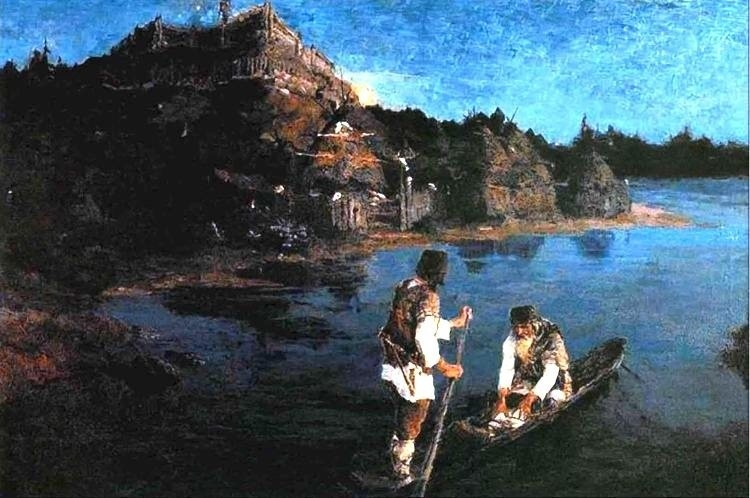
A scene from the 860s tribal war, by Nicholas Roerich (1897)

No primary source specifies what happened to the Rus' converts of the 9th century. The scope and importance of this first conversion is also disputed. The authors of the imperial period, starting with August Ludwig von Schlozer, assumed that only a fraction of the Rus' society adopted Christianity at the time of Photius. Dmitry Ilovaisky, for instance, speculated that Photius had referred to the Christianization of the so-called Tmutarakan (or Pontic) Rus', while the Novgorod (or Northern) Rus' remained pagan for another century.

Some Soviet historians (Boris Grekov, Vladimir Pashuto, Rybakov) argued that Christianity was adopted in the 9th century only by the Varangian elite of the Rus' Khaganate. That the fact of the first Christianization was obliterated so rapidly is explained by the 882 coup d'état that led to the downfall of the supposedly Christian Askold and the usurpation of power by the pagan Oleg. (But some sources noted that Oleg was a Varangian too.) The first proponent of this theory was Vasily Tatischev who concluded that Askold and Dir had been murdered on account of their Christian views. He went so far as to style Askold "the first Russian martyr".

Constantine Zuckerman rejects Rybakov's view that Photius converted the Kievan Rus'. He ranks among those authors who believe that the centre of the Rus' Khaganate was Novgorod. According to him, the Christianized Varangians were expelled from the country during the anti-Varangian movement of the 860s or 870s. This movement, associated in the Novgorodian tradition with the name of Vadim the Bold, may have been triggered by the Varangians' attempts to Christianize the pagan populace. Their failure to convert the Ilmen Slavs supposedly resulted in the collapse of the Rus' Khaganate.

== See also ==
- Christianization of Kievan Rus
- Christianity in the 9th century
