= Theoktistos Bryennios =

Theoktistos Bryennios (Greek: Θεόκτιστος Βρυέννιος, fl. c. 842) was a Greek nobleman and a Byzantine general who quelled a Slavic rebellion in the Peloponnese in 842.

Theoktistos Bryennios is the first known member of the aristocratic Bryennios family, which survived until the end of the Byzantine Empire and reached its apogee in the 11th–12th centuries, when it provided several senior military commanders and contended for the throne. He is known only from the 10th-century De administrando imperio of Emperor Constantine VII Porphyrogennetos (reigned 913–959), which records that at the beginning of the regency of Empress Theodora, i.e. in 842, the protospatharios Bryennios was appointed military governor (strategos) of the Peloponnese theme, and sent with a large army, comprising troops from all of Byzantium's western provinces, against a large-scale revolt of the local Slavs that had broken out in the last years of Theodora's husband, Emperor Theophilos (r. 829–842). This was the second large-scale Slavic uprising in a generation, the first having been the attack on Patras in the mid-9th century, the defeat of which was followed by the imposition of Byzantine rule over the semi-independent Slavic tribes, and the beginning of their gradual Hellenization.

Bryennios was successful in suppressing the revolt and subduing the Slavic tribes, except for two, the Ezeritai and the Melingoi. Bryennios forced them to withdraw from the lowlands of the Laconian plain to the mountains Taygetos and Parnon, and imposed on them the obligation to pay an annual tribute, of 300 gold solidi for the Ezeritai and 60 solidi for the Melingoi. The Melingoi and Ezeritai would once again rebel against Byzantine authority in 921/2, but were again suppressed by the strategos Krenites Arotras.

== Sources ==
- Curta, Florin (2011). The Edinburgh History of the Greeks, c. 500 to 1050: The Early Middle Ages. Edinburgh: Edinburgh University Press. ISBN 978-0-7486-3809-3.
- Kazhdan, Alexander (1991). "Bryennios". In Kazhdan, Alexander (ed.). The Oxford Dictionary of Byzantium. Oxford and New York: Oxford University Press. pp. 328–329. ISBN 0-19-504652-8.
- Lilie, Ralph-Johannes; Ludwig, Claudia; Pratsch, Thomas; Zielke, Beate (2001). Prosopographie der mittelbyzantinischen Zeit: 1. Abteilung (641–867), Band 4: Platon (# 6266) – Theophylaktos (# 8345) (in German). Berlin and Boston: De Gruyter. pp. 581–582. ISBN 978-3-11-016674-3.
