= Siege of Patras (805 or 807) =

Military campaign involving Slavic tribes and the Byzantine empire

| Date | 805 or 807 |
| Location | Patras, Greece 38°15′N 21°44′E |
| Result | Byzantine victory |

Belligerents
| Byzantine inhabitants of Patras | Slavs of the Peloponnese; Saracen fleet (uncertain) |

The siege of Patras in 805 or 807 was undertaken by the local Slavic tribes of the Peloponnese, reportedly with aid from an Arab fleet. The siege's failure, attributed to the miraculous intervention of the city's patron, Saint Andrew, marked the consolidation of Byzantine control over the Peloponnese peninsula after two centuries of Slavic occupation over its western half. It also marked the beginning of the ascendancy of the Metropolis of Patras in the peninsula's ecclesiastical affairs.

== Background ==
The Byzantine Empire's military position in the Balkans collapsed in the early 7th century as a result of disastrous military ventures against the Persians and then the Arabs in the East, which forced the effective abandonment of the Danube limes and opened the way for large-scale penetration and settlement of the Balkan hinterland by various Slavic tribes. The Slavs raided as far as southern Greece and the coasts of Asia Minor. Most of the region's cities were sacked or abandoned and only a few, including Thessalonica, remained occupied and in imperial hands.

Byzantine Greece in the 9th/10th centuries

In Greece, the eastern coasts of the Peloponnese and Central Greece remained in Byzantine hands as the theme of Hellas, while in the interior, various Slavic groups established themselves. A large native Greek population probably also remained in the land, either mixed with the Slavs or in its own autonomous communities. As elsewhere, a mostly peaceful modus vivendi soon emerged between the Slavs and the remaining Byzantine strongholds, with the mainly agricultural Slavs trading with the Byzantine-held coastal towns. Further north, in the Greek mainland, by the turn of the 7th to 8th century smaller Slavic districts or sclaviniae emerged around the fringes of imperial territory, ruled by their own archons, who received Byzantine titles and recognized some form of imperial suzerainty. Imperial authority across Greece was greatly restored by the campaign of the logothete Staurakios in 783, who ventured from Constantinople overland to Thessalonica and from there south to the Peloponnese, subduing the Slavs of those regions.

Patras, on the northwestern coast of the Peloponnese, is claimed by the Chronicle of Monemvasia—a work of highly disputed accuracy and chronology, but an essential source for the period—to have been one of the cities abandoned c. 587/8 as a result of the Slavic depredations, its population fleeing to Rhegion in Calabria. This was followed by 218 years of independent Slavic occupation in the Peloponnese, until around 804/5. The archaeological record on the other hand shows Patras to have remained in Byzantine control throughout the period, although it is possible that part of the population indeed immigrated to Italy.

== Siege of Patras ==
According to Chapter 49 of the De administrando imperio of Emperor Constantine VII Porphyrogennetos (r. 913–959), in the reign of Emperor Nikephoros I (r. 802–811) the Slavs of the Peloponnese made war on the Greek population with the aid of "African Saracens", looted the countryside and laid siege to Patras. The city held out for a while, but as food began growing short, the inhabitants gave thought to surrendering. First, however, they dispatched a rider to the direction of Corinth, the seat of the military governor (strategos), to find out whether he was coming to their aid or not. The envoy had been instructed on his return to give a signal through a flag he carried: if help was on its way, he was to dip the flag, otherwise to hold it erect. The rider found out that the strategos was not coming or was delayed — Constantine VII writes that he arrived three days after the siege had ended — but on his return to the city, his horse slipped and both he and the flag fell down. The inhabitants of Patras interpreted this as a sign that aid was near, and sallied forth against the besieging Slavs, allegedly led by the city's patron Saint Andrew himself on horseback. The Slavs panicked at the sudden assault and fled, abandoning the siege. As a punishment, Constantine VII records that the Slavs were thereafter obligated to maintain at their own cost all officials or envoys passing through Patras, relieving the local see of this burden.

Constantine VII gives no precise date for the attack, but it has been usually dated to around 805, when the city of Patras was "re-founded", according to the Chronicle of Monemvasia, or to 807, when an Arab ("Saracen") fleet is known to have reached southern Greece, although the Arab participation may well be the result of a later interpolation, mixing the real Slavic revolt with subsequent Arab raids. The Chronicle of Monemvasia on the other hand does not mention any siege of the city. Instead, it records that an Armenian strategos at Corinth named Skleros defeated the Peloponnesian Slavs, and that this victory, in the year 804/5 or 805/6, marked the end of "218 years" of Slavic occupation in the Peloponnese. Emperor Nikephoros I is then said to have rebuilt Patras by bringing back the descendants of its original inhabitants from Rhegion, and to have engaged in a large-scale resettlement and Christianization program for the peninsula, bringing in Greek colonists from Italy and Asia Minor. Nikephoros' resettlement program at least is also confirmed by the chronicler Theophanes the Confessor, who puts it slightly later, in 810/1.

Some scholars have tried to reconcile the conflicting accounts of the Chronicle and the De administrando imperio as implying a first recovery of Patras c. 805 as the result of Skleros' campaign, which was probably concurrent with the establishment of the Peloponnese as a separate theme from Hellas, if this had not been done slightly earlier. According to this interpretation, the Slavic revolt and attack on Patras followed as a reaction a few years later, between 807 and 811.

== Aftermath ==
Whatever the exact course of events in the early 9th century, the failure of the Slavic attack on Patras consolidated the recently re-established Byzantine control over the Peloponnese, and Nikephoros I's policies led to the successful re-Christianization and Hellenization of the peninsula. The defence of Patras also secured the Byzantine Empire's main maritime road of communication with Italy and the West, as it opened up the shorter route through the Corinthian Gulf, instead of the longer, more dangerous route around the Peloponnese that was exposed to Arab attacks.

According to Constantine VII, the Slavs rose up again in the early 840s, but were defeated by strategos Theoktistos Bryennios. In the south, the two tribes of the Ezeritai and Melingoi held out longer. They were eventually subdued and forced to pay heavy tribute, but retained their autonomy. These two tribes rose up again a century later, in 921. Again they were quickly subdued, this time by the strategos Krenites Arotras, but managed to remain autonomous and retain their distinct identity until well into Frankish times.

The successful repulsion of the siege through the "intervention" of Saint Andrew also marked the abrupt rise of the see of Patras to prominence: formerly a suffragan of the Metropolis of Corinth, it was raised to a separate metropolis and came to enjoy great political and financial influence. Henceforth, the metropolitan of Patras rivalled with his former superior in Corinth over control of the other sees of the Peloponnese.

== Sources ==
- Avramea, Anna (2012). Η Πελοπόννησος από τον 4ο ως τον 8ο αιώνα: Αλλαγές και συνέχεια [The Peloponnese from the 4th to the 8th century: Changes and continuity.] (in Greek). Athens: National Bank of Greece Cultural Foundation. ISBN 978-960-250-501-4.
- Charanis, Peter (1946). "Nicephorus I, The Savior of Greece from the Slavs (810 A.D.)". Byzantina-Metabyzantina. I, Part I. New York: 75–92.
- Charanis, Peter (1950). "The Chronicle of Monemvasia and the Question of the Slavonic Settlements in Greece". Dumbarton Oaks Papers. V. Washington, DC: 141–166. doi:10.2307/1291076. JSTOR 1291076.
- Curta, Florin (2006). Southeastern Europe in the Middle Ages, 500–1250. Cambridge: Cambridge University Press. ISBN 978-0-521-81539-0.
- Fine, John V. A. Jr. (1991) [1983]. The Early Medieval Balkans: A Critical Survey from the Sixth to the Late Twelfth Century. Ann Arbor: University of Michigan Press. ISBN 0-472-08149-7.
- Gregory, Timothy E. (1991). "Patras". In Kazhdan, Alexander (ed.). The Oxford Dictionary of Byzantium. Oxford and New York: Oxford University Press. pp. 1597–1598. ISBN 0-19-504652-8.
- Moravscik, Gyula; Jenkins, R.J.H., eds. (1967). Constantine Porphyrogenitus: De Administrando Imperio. Washington, DC: Dumbarton Oaks. ISBN 0-88402-021-5.
- Toynbee, Arnold (1973). Constantine Porphyrogenitus and His World. Oxford University Press. ISBN 0-19-215253-X.
- Whittow, Mark (1996). The Making of Byzantium, 600–1025. Berkeley and Los Angeles, California: University of California Press. ISBN 978-0-520-20496-6.
