= John Proteuon =

John Proteuon (Greek: Ἰωάννης Πρωτεύων, Ioannes Proteuon) was the Byzantine governor (strategos) of the Theme of the Peloponnese in ca. 921/2.

The protospatharios John Proteuon was the military governor (strategos) of the theme of the Peloponnese until spring 921 or 922, when he was replaced by Krenites Arotras. Probably in 920 he was tasked with raising troops for service against the Lombards in southern Italy, but the locals resisted being conscripted, and proposed instead to provide a thousand horses with their equipment as well as 100 pounds of gold. The Slavic tribes of the Melingoi and the Ezeritai however refused to comply and rebelled in early 921. The suppression of their rebellion was carried out by Proteuon's successor Arotras.

== Sources ==
- Curta, Florin (2011). The Edinburgh History of the Greeks, c. 500 to 1050: The Early Middle Ages. Edinburgh: Edinburgh University Press. ISBN 978-0-7486-3809-3.
- Lilie, Ralph-Johannes; Ludwig, Claudia; Pratsch, Thomas; Zielke, Beate (2013). Prosopographie der mittelbyzantinischen Zeit Online. Berlin-Brandenburgische Akademie der Wissenschaften. Nach Vorarbeiten F. Winkelmanns erstellt (in German). Berlin and Boston: De Gruyter.
