= Krenites Arotras =

Byzantine aristocrat and military governor

Krinites or Krenites Arotras (Greek: Κρινίτης or Κρηνίτης Ἀροτρᾶς) was a Byzantine aristocrat and military governor in southern Greece. He is most notable for suppressing a Slavic revolt in the Peloponnese in 921/22.

== Origin and appointment to the Peloponnese ==
Arotras was a scion of the Krenites family, an aristocratic clan present in Byzantium since the early 9th century. Peter Charanis speculates that the family was of Armenian origin, however his methods of identifying Armenians in the Byzantine Empire are questionable, and have been criticized by historians such as Anthony Kaldellis who are hesitant to accept them. Nevertheless, in early 921 or 922 (earlier scholars dated this event to c. 935), when he held the rank of protospatharios, he was appointed as military governor (strategos) of the theme of the Peloponnese and tasked with suppressing the revolt of the Slavic tribes of the Melingoi and Ezeritai.

The two tribes had rebelled in the past, in 840–42, and after their defeat by Theoktistos Bryennios had been obliged to pay an annual tribute of 60 and 300 gold solidi respectively. In c. 920, they began to disobey the commands of the strategos John Proteuon, refusing to accept the rulers ("archons") he chose for them and to be conscripted for overseas service in southern Italy against an ongoing Lombard rebellion. According to the account of Emperor Constantine VII Porphyrogennetos (r. 913–959) in his De administrando imperio, Arotras began his campaign against them in March, burning and plundering their lands around Mount Taygetos until November. The two tribes submitted again, and were condemned to pay an increased tribute of 600 solidi. Arotras was transferred (late 922 or early 923) to the neighbouring theme of Hellas and was replaced by Bardas Platypodes. Under Platypodes, strife in the Peloponnese resumed as he quarrelled with the local nobility, while another revolt by Slavic troops in the Peloponnese followed soon after, which the Melingoi and Ezeritai exploited in getting their tribute reduced to the previous amounts.

== Possible identifications ==
Two 10th-century seals mentioning the "imperial protospatharios and strategos of the Peloponnese Krenites" are known and probably belong to him. He has also been identified by some with a person of the same name, mentioned in the hagiography of Saint Luke of Steiris. This Krenites served as strategos of Hellas from c. 945 until 952/955, before going on to serve as strategos of the Peloponnese. Most scholars, however, believe the two to be separate persons. Some scholars, like Steven Runciman, also equated him with another Krenites, who was used by Emperor Romanos I Lekapenos (r. 920–944) in diplomatic missions to the Armenian princes.

== Sources ==
- Charanis, Peter (1963). The Armenians in the Byzantine Empire. Lisbon: Fundação Calouste Gulbenkian Armenian Library. OCLC 17186882.
- Curta, Florin (2011). The Edinburgh History of the Greeks, c. 500 to 1050: The Early Middle Ages. Edinburgh: Edinburgh University Press. ISBN 978-0-7486-3809-3.
- Herrin, Judith (2013). Margins and Metropolis: Authority across the Byzantine Empire. Princeton, New Jersey: Princeton University Press. ISBN 978-0-691-15301-8.
- Nesbitt, John W.; Oikonomides, Nicolas, eds. (1994). Catalogue of Byzantine Seals at Dumbarton Oaks and in the Fogg Museum of Art, Volume 2: South of the Balkans, the Islands, South of Asia Minor. Washington, DC: Dumbarton Oaks Research Library and Collection. ISBN 0-88402-226-9.
- Perra, Fotini (2011). "Krenites Arotras (strategos of the Theme of Hellas)". Encyclopedia of the Hellenic World, Boeotia. Foundation of the Hellenic World.
- Runciman, Steven (1988) [1929]. The Emperor Romanus Lecapenus and His Reign: A Study of Tenth-Century Byzantium. Cambridge: Cambridge University Press. ISBN 0-521-35722-5.
