= Kinsterna =

Kinsterna (Greek: Κινστέρνα) or Gisterna was a Slavic-inhabited district in the southern Peloponnese during the Late Middle Ages.

The Kinsterna is described as a fertile and rich plain northwest of the Mani Peninsula, and inhabited by Slavs, most likely the Melingoi tribe. The district was ceded by the Principality of Achaea to the Byzantine province around Mystras in 1263, but it remained largely autonomous. Thus in 1295, some of the local tribesmen captured Kalamata on their own initiative, and both the local Byzantine governor and Emperor Andronikos II Palaiologos declared themselves unable to force them to restore it to the Principality, while in the next year, the Prince of Achaea was able to recruit 200 men and a ship from among its inhabitants to fend off Byzantine attacks in Skorta.

The castles of Grand Magne and Leuktron or Beaufort were erected by the Princes of Achaea to keep the raids of the Slavs of Kinsterna at bay.

== Sources ==
- Bon, Antoine (1969). La Morée franque. Recherches historiques, topographiques et archéologiques sur la principauté d'Achaïe [The Frankish Morea. Historical, Topographic and Archaeological Studies on the Principality of Achaea] (in French). Paris: De Boccard. OCLC 869621129.
- Nicoloudis, N. (2003). "The 'Theme of Kinsterna'". In Dendrinos, Charalambos; Harris, Jonathan; Harvalia-Crook, Eirene; et al. (eds.). Porphyrogenita – Essays on the History and the Literature of Byzantium and the Latin East in honour of Julian Chrysostomides. Aldershot and Burlington: Ashgate Publishing Limited. pp. 85–89. ISBN 978-0-7546-3696-0.
