= Peloponnese (theme) =

Province of the Byzantine Empire

Theme of the Peloponnese Πελοπόννησος, θέμα Πελοποννήσου
- Theme of the Byzantine Empire
- ca. 800 – 1205
- Map of Byzantine Greece ca. 900 AD, with the themes and major settlements.
- Capital: Corinth
- Historical era: Middle Ages
  - Established: ca. 800
  - Conquered by Crusaders: 1205
Preceded by	Succeeded by
Hellas (theme)	Principality of Achaea
- Today part of: Greece

The Theme of the Peloponnese (Greek: θέμα Πελοποννήσου) was a Byzantine military-civilian province (thema, theme) encompassing the Peloponnese peninsula in southern Greece. It was established in c. 800, and its capital was Corinth.

== History ==
=== Slavic invasions and settlements ===
From 27 BC until the end of the 6th century, the Peloponnese formed part of the province of Achaea, which during Late Antiquity comprised also the eastern parts of Central Greece. Its capital was Corinth.

From the 580s on, as attested in the Chronicle of Monemvasia, the Slavic invasions which affected the wider Balkans reached the peninsula, and led to the abandonment of the urban centres of Antiquity in favour of either remote or offshore locations like Monemvasia, while the inhabitants of several cities such as Patras are claimed by the Chronicle to have emigrated to Italy altogether. Along with statements by medieval chroniclers like Isidore of Seville and Constantine Porphyrogennetos that southern Greece had completely submitted to the Slavs, this led to assumptions by earlier scholars that collapse of Byzantine control was total, and that the Peloponnese remained outside imperial control for two centuries afterwards. The literary evidence is partially confirmed by several buried coin hoards from the 570s/580s and early 7th century, which attest to large-scale upheaval in two waves, one that peaked ca. 587, the date provided by the Chronicle, and one that peaked in the far larger crisis of the reign of Heraclius (r. 610–641). Literary, toponymic and archaeological evidence on the other hand shows that the Slavic invaders settled mostly in the western half of the peninsula, i.e. the fertile plains of Elis and Messenia, Achaea and the plateau of Arcadia, while Byzantine authority survived in the more mountainous eastern parts of the peninsula as well as in various outposts around the coast, including Patras. Nevertheless, as the rapid-re-Hellenization of the peninsula in the 9th century shows, a large Greek-speaking population must have remained in the areas overrun by the Slavs.

=== Formation and evolution of the theme ===
Sometime between 687 and 695, all remaining imperial territory in southern Greece came under the new theme of Hellas, which had a strongly maritime character, being composed of coastal territories and mostly oriented towards the sea. In about 800, however, Hellas was split up, and while the name was retained for the territory comprising eastern Central Greece and Thessaly, the Peloponnese became a separate theme, with Corinth as the capital. The formation of the new province is directly linked to the re-imposition of the Byzantine government's control over the Slavic tribes at this time. This was achieved by the victories of the strategos (military governor) Skleros in 805, as reported by the Chronicle of Monemvasia, and the failure of a Slavic siege of Patras at about the same time. Emperor Nikephoros I (r. 802–811) followed up these successes with an extensive colonization and Christianization programme, which included the region's resettlement with Greeks from Italy and Asia Minor.

The first known strategos of the Peloponnese is Leo Skleros, attested for 811 (possibly the same as, or a close relative of, the Skleros of 805), who may even be the first holder of the office. The strategos of the Peloponnese ranked first in the hierarchy of the "western" (i.e. European) thematic governors. The role of his administration was mostly controlling the Slavic tribes of the interior—rebellions by the autonomous and tribute-paying Melingoi and Ezeritai tribes occurred in 840/42 and 921/22, the latter followed also by a rebellion of Slavic troops from Asia Minor—and defence against the Arab raids, which were frequent in the 9th and 10th centuries: among other subordinate officials, a tourmarches was charged with the defence of the coast and even had a naval squadron of four chelandia under his orders.

After the Byzantine reconquest of Crete in 961 put an end to the piratical emirate there, the Peloponnese prospered greatly. From the late 10th century on, the thematic administration was often combined with that of Hellas, and in the late 11th century, this union became permanent, with both provinces coming under the control of the megas doux, the commander-in-chief of the Byzantine navy. Due to the latter's absence from the province, however, the local administration remained under the local praetor, a position often held by senior and distinguished officials like the legal scholars Alexios Aristenos and Nicholas Hagiotheodorites. The joint theme of Hellas-Peloponnese was subdivided further during the 12th century into a series of smaller fiscal districts variously termed oria, chartoularata and episkepseis. The Peloponnese remained under Byzantine control until the early 13th century (1205), when, in the aftermath of the Fourth Crusade, the Latin Principality of Achaea was established there.

== Notes ==
a: The episkepseis were large domains allocated for the support of individuals, noble houses or churches and monasteries. The oria were districts tasked with the maintenance of warships and crews for the navy. The chartoularata were districts placed under a chartoularios, and tasked with provisioning the imperial army with horses and pack animals. They also seem to have functioned as military assembly points, similar to the old metata and aplekta.

== Sources ==
- Avramea, Anna (2012). Η Πελοπόννησος από τον 4ο ως τον 8ο αιώνα: Αλλαγές και συνέχεια [The Peloponnese from the 4th to the 8th century: Changes and continuity.] (in Greek). Athens: National Bank of Greece Cultural Foundation. ISBN 978-960-250-501-4.
- Curta, Florin (2011). The Edinburgh History of the Greeks, c. 500 to 1050: The Early Middle Ages. Edinburgh: Edinburgh University Press. ISBN 978-0-7486-3809-3.
- Fine, John V. A. Jr. (1991) [1983]. The Early Medieval Balkans: A Critical Survey from the Sixth to the Late Twelfth Century. Ann Arbor: University of Michigan Press. ISBN 0-472-08149-7.
- Herrin, Judith (2013). Margins and Metropolis: Authority across the Byzantine Empire. Princeton, New Jersey: Princeton University Press. ISBN 978-0-691-15301-8.
- Kazhdan, Alexander, ed. (1991). The Oxford Dictionary of Byzantium. Oxford and New York: Oxford University Press. ISBN 0-19-504652-8.
- Koder, Johannes; Hild, Friedrich (1976). Tabula Imperii Byzantini, Band 1: Hellas und Thessalia (in German). Vienna: Verlag der Österreichischen Akademie der Wissenschaften. ISBN 978-3-7001-0182-6.
- Magdalino, Paul (2002) [1993]. The Empire of Manuel I Komnenos, 1143–1180 (Second ed.). Cambridge: Cambridge University Press. ISBN 9780521526531.
- Nesbitt, John; Oikonomides, Nicolas, eds. (1994). Catalogue of Byzantine Seals at Dumbarton Oaks and in the Fogg Museum of Art, Volume 2: South of the Balkans, the Islands, South of Asia Minor. Vol. 2. Washington, DC: Dumbarton Oaks Research Library and Collection. ISBN 0-88402-226-9.
- Pertusi, A. (1952). Constantino Porfirogenito: De Thematibus (in Italian). Rome: Biblioteca Apostolica Vaticana.
