= Peloponnese =

Traditional peninsular region in Greece

Coordinates: 37°24′N 22°18′E

Peloponnese Πελοπόννησος
- Geographic region of Greece
- Peloponnese (blue) within Greece
- Country: Greece
- Administrative regions: Peloponnese (region); Western Greece (in part); Attica (region) (in part)
- Traditional capitals: Tripoli and Nafplio
- Largest city: Patra

Area
  - Total: 21,549.6 km^{2} (8,320.3 sq mi)

Population (2011)
  - Total: 1,155,019
  - Density: 53.5982/km^{2} (138.819/sq mi)
- Demonym: Peloponnesian
- ISO 3166 code: GR-J

The Peloponnese, (Note: Pronunciation: /ˌpɛləpəˈniːz, -ˈniːs/ PEL-ə-pə-NEEZ, -NEESS) Peloponnesus, (Note: Pronunciations and translation: /ˌpɛləpəˈniːsəs/ PEL-ə-pə-NEE-səs; Greek: Πελοπόννησος, romanized: Pelopónnēsos, IPA: [peloˈponisos]) or Morea, (Note: Translations: Medieval Greek: Μωρέας, romanized: Mōrèas; Greek: Μωριάς, romanized: Mōriàs) is a peninsula and geographic region in southern Greece, and the southernmost region of the Balkans. It is connected to the central part of the country by the Isthmus of Corinth land bridge, which separates the Gulf of Corinth from the Saronic Gulf. From the late Middle Ages until the 19th century, the peninsula was known as the Morea, a name still in colloquial use in its demotic form.

The peninsula is divided among three administrative regions: most belong to the Peloponnese region, with smaller parts belonging to the Western Greece and Attica regions.

== Geography ==
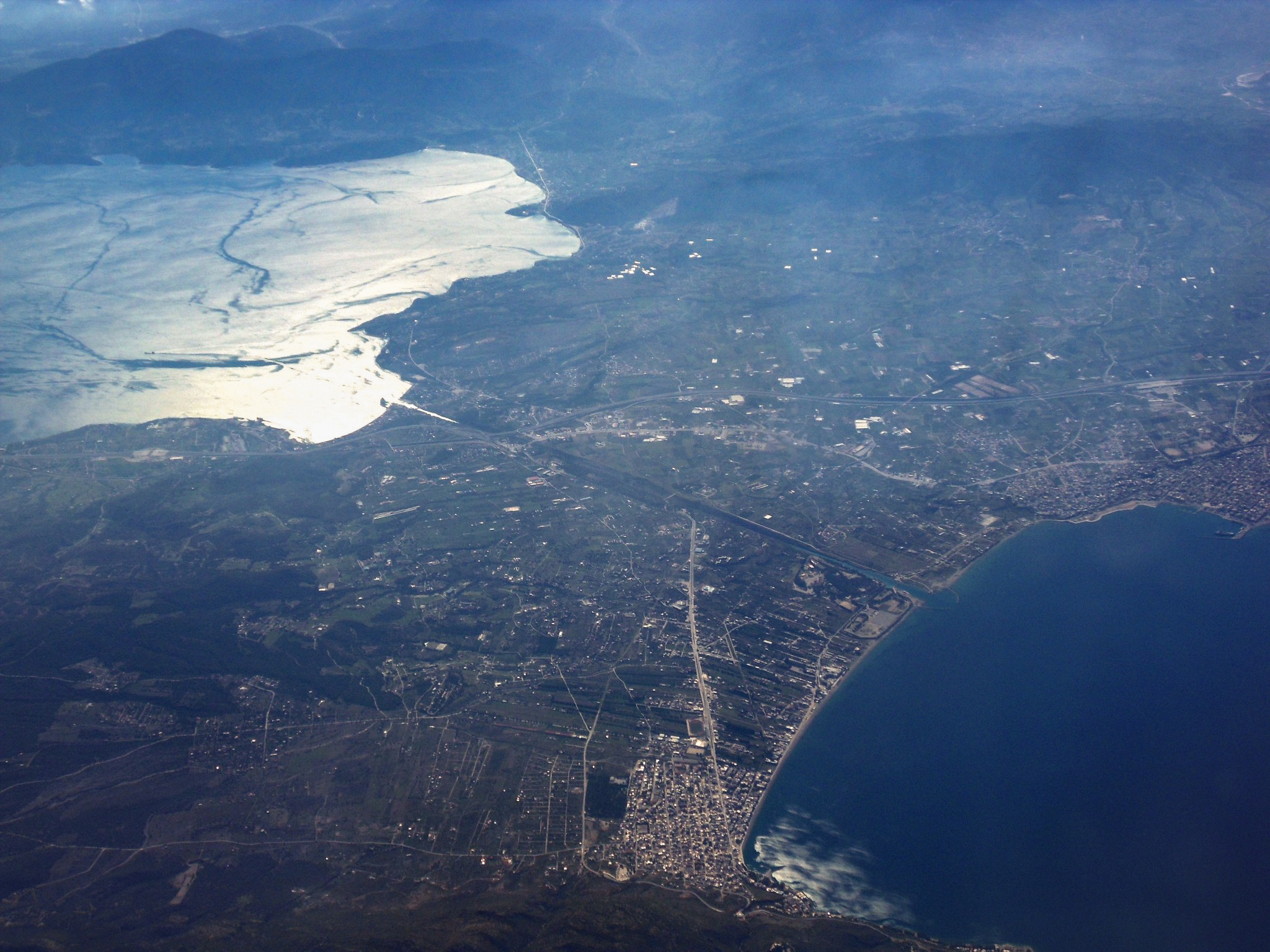
The Corinth Canal

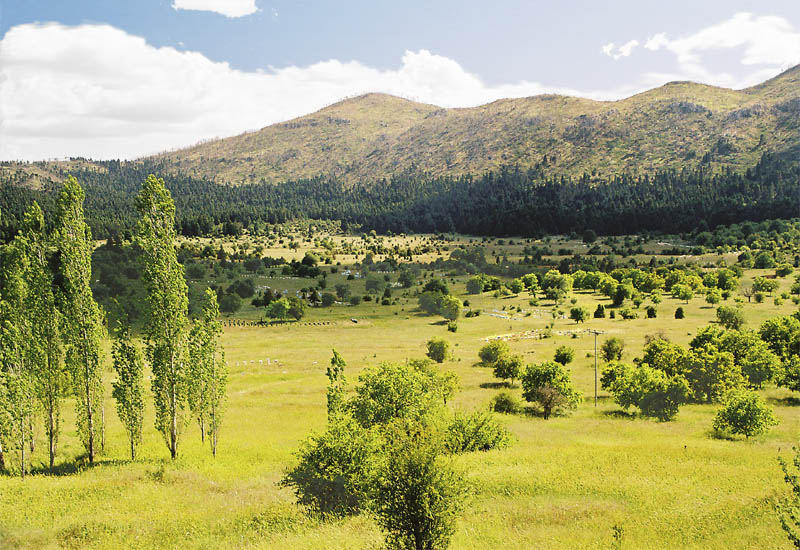
Landscape in Arcadia

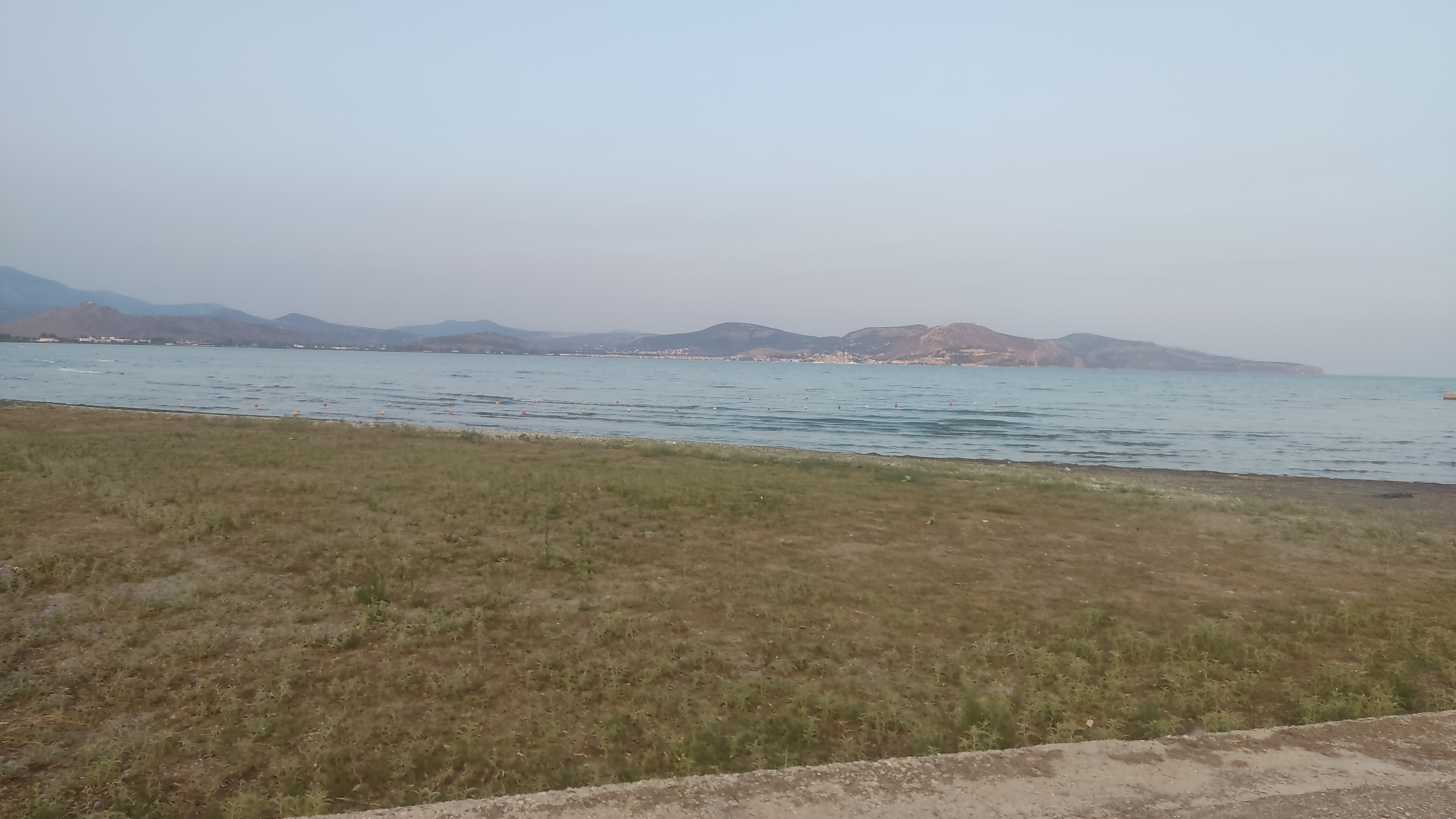
View of the Argolic gulf, with Nafplio visible

The Peloponnese is a peninsula located at the southern tip of the mainland, 21,549.6 square kilometres (8,320.3 mi^{2}) in area, and constitutes the southernmost part of mainland Greece. It is connected to the mainland by the Isthmus of Corinth, where the Corinth Canal was constructed in 1893. However, it is also connected to the mainland by several bridges across the canal, including two submersible bridges at the north and the south end. Near the northern tip of the peninsula, there is another bridge, the Rio–Antirrio bridge (completed 2004). The peninsula has a mountainous interior, although extensive lowlands are also found in the west, in the Evrotas Valley in the south, and in the Argolid Peninsula in the northeast. The Peloponnese possesses four south-pointing peninsulas: the Messenian, the Mani, the Cape Malea, and the Argolid in the far northeast of the Peloponnese. The Messenian Gulf, Laconian Gulf, and Argolic Gulf separate these peninsulas. Moreover, Mount Taygetus in the south is the highest mountain in the Peloponnese, at 2,407 metres (7,897 ft). Οther important mountains include Cyllene in the northeast (2,376 m or 7,795 ft), Aroania in the north (2,355 m or 7,726 ft), Erymanthos (2,224 m or 7,297 ft) and Panachaikon in the northwest (1,926 m or 6,319 ft), Mainalon in the center (1,981 m or 6,499 ft), and Parnon in the southeast (1,935 m or 6,348 ft). The entire peninsula is earthquake-prone and has suffered many earthquakes in the past.

The longest river is the Alfeios in the west (110 km or 68 mi), followed by the Evrotas in the south (82 km or 51 mi), and also the Pineios, also in the west (70 km or 43 mi). The Peloponnese, with its indented coasts, is home to numerous spectacular beaches, which are a major tourist draw.

Two groups of islands lie off the Peloponnesian coast: the Argo-Saronic Islands to the east, and the Ionian to the west. The island of Kythira, to the south of the Peloponnese, is considered to be part of the Ionian Islands. The island of Elafonisos used to be part of the peninsula but was separated in the aftermath of the 365 Crete earthquake.

Since antiquity, and continuing to the present day, the Peloponnese has been divided into seven major regions: Achaea (north), Corinthia (northeast), Argolis (east), Arcadia (center), Laconia (southeast), Messenia (southwest), and Elis (west). Each of these regions is headed by a city, with the largest being Patras (pop. 170,000) in Achaia, followed by Kalamata (pop. 55,000) in Messenia.

=== Climate ===
The Peloponnese for the most part enjoys a hot-summer Mediterranean climate (Köppen climate classification: Csa), while the Gulf of Corinth has a hot semi-arid climate (Köppen climate classification: BSh). Rainfall is higher on the west coast, while the east of the peninsula is significantly drier. Average annual temperatures can reach up to 20.3 °C (68.5 °F) while summer highs reach over 36.0 °C (96.8 °F) in Sparta, within the Evrotas Valley. On 27 June 2007, Monemvasia registered a staggering minimum temperature of 35.9 °C, which is the highest minimum temperature ever recorded in mainland Greece and Continental Europe.

Climate data for Patras Port (2008–2025)
Month	Jan	Feb	Mar	Apr	May	Jun	Jul	Aug	Sep	Oct	Nov	Dec	Year
Record high °C (°F)	24.9 (76.8)	25.6 (78.1)	25.1 (77.2)	32.0 (89.6)	37.2 (99.0)	38.9 (102.0)	42.5 (108.5)	40.7 (105.3)	35.7 (96.3)	30.6 (87.1)	28.1 (82.6)	26.8 (80.2)	42.5 (108.5)
Mean daily maximum °C (°F)	16.0 (60.8)	16.9 (62.4)	16.2 (61.2)	19.6 (67.3)	23.1 (73.6)	27.4 (81.3)	30.4 (86.7)	31.5 (88.7)	27.4 (81.3)	23.5 (74.3)	19.8 (67.6)	17.0 (62.6)	22.4 (72.3)
Daily mean °C (°F)	11.8 (53.2)	12.4 (54.3)	13.7 (56.7)	16.9 (62.4)	20.3 (68.5)	24.6 (76.3)	27.4 (81.3)	28.4 (83.1)	24.8 (76.6)	20.8 (69.4)	17.2 (63.0)	13.6 (56.5)	19.3 (66.8)
Mean daily minimum °C (°F)	9.4 (48.9)	10.9 (51.6)	11.1 (52.0)	14.1 (57.4)	17.6 (63.7)	21.7 (71.1)	24.4 (75.9)	25.2 (77.4)	22.2 (72.0)	18.0 (64.4)	14.6 (58.3)	11.2 (52.2)	16.7 (62.1)
Record low °C (°F)	1.2 (34.2)	−0.9 (30.4)	2.3 (36.1)	8.2 (46.8)	11.9 (53.4)	15.0 (59.0)	19.3 (66.7)	20.1 (68.2)	15.8 (60.4)	9.2 (48.6)	7.4 (45.3)	3.0 (37.4)	−0.9 (30.4)
Average rainfall mm (inches)	108.1 (4.26)	67.9 (2.67)	71.2 (2.80)	36.2 (1.43)	22.4 (0.88)	15.5 (0.61)	5.0 (0.20)	6.8 (0.27)	41.5 (1.63)	84.0 (3.31)	111.1 (4.37)	116.0 (4.57)	685.7 (27)
Source 1: National Observatory of Athens Monthly Bulletins (Jan 2008 – Jan 2025)
Source 2: Patras N.O.A station and World Meteorological Organization

Climate data for Monemvasia (2007–2025)
Month	Jan	Feb	Mar	Apr	May	Jun	Jul	Aug	Sep	Oct	Nov	Dec	Year
Record high °C (°F)	22.4 (72.3)	25.3 (77.5)	25.8 (78.4)	30.5 (86.9)	35.3 (95.5)	45.2 (113.4)	42.7 (108.9)	39.9 (103.8)	38.3 (100.9)	33.2 (91.8)	31.4 (88.5)	24.9 (76.8)	45.2 (113.4)
Mean daily maximum °C (°F)	15.1 (59.2)	15.6 (60.1)	17.4 (63.3)	20.7 (69.3)	25.0 (77.0)	29.7 (85.5)	32.2 (90.0)	32.1 (89.8)	28.7 (83.7)	24.0 (75.2)	20.3 (68.5)	16.7 (62.1)	23.1 (73.6)
Daily mean °C (°F)	12.8 (55.0)	13.3 (55.9)	14.7 (58.5)	17.6 (63.7)	21.5 (70.7)	26.0 (78.8)	28.7 (83.7)	28.8 (83.8)	25.6 (78.1)	21.6 (70.9)	18.1 (64.6)	14.6 (58.3)	20.3 (68.5)
Mean daily minimum °C (°F)	10.6 (51.1)	10.9 (51.6)	11.9 (53.4)	14.5 (58.1)	18.0 (64.4)	22.2 (72.0)	25.2 (77.4)	25.6 (78.1)	22.5 (72.5)	19.2 (66.6)	15.9 (60.6)	12.4 (54.3)	17.4 (63.3)
Record low °C (°F)	2.1 (35.8)	1.6 (34.9)	4.2 (39.6)	9.1 (48.4)	12.1 (53.8)	15.8 (60.4)	18.4 (65.1)	20.5 (68.9)	16.7 (62.1)	12.5 (54.5)	8.9 (48.0)	4.7 (40.5)	1.6 (34.9)
Average rainfall mm (inches)	103.6 (4.08)	67.9 (2.67)	37.2 (1.46)	19.7 (0.78)	7.8 (0.31)	9.7 (0.38)	2.6 (0.10)	1.2 (0.05)	26.9 (1.06)	56.2 (2.21)	96.3 (3.79)	97.4 (3.83)	526.5 (20.72)
Source 1: National Observatory of Athens Monthly Bulletins (Apr 2007 – Jan 2025)
Source 2: Monemvasia N.O.A station and World Meteorological Organization

Climate data for Sparta 180 m a.s.l
Month	Jan	Feb	Mar	Apr	May	Jun	Jul	Aug	Sep	Oct	Nov	Dec	Year
Record high °C (°F)	23.5 (74.3)	26.4 (79.5)	27.2 (81.0)	34.1 (93.4)	40.7 (105.3)	44.4 (111.9)	44.2 (111.6)	45.7 (114.3)	40.3 (104.5)	36.4 (97.5)	30.8 (87.4)	23.5 (74.3)	45.7 (114.3)
Mean daily maximum °C (°F)	14.6 (58.3)	15.9 (60.6)	18.6 (65.5)	22.9 (73.2)	27.8 (82.0)	32.9 (91.2)	36.3 (97.3)	36.0 (96.8)	31.3 (88.3)	25.5 (77.9)	20.2 (68.4)	16.0 (60.8)	24.8 (76.7)
Daily mean °C (°F)	8.9 (48.0)	9.9 (49.8)	12.1 (53.8)	15.5 (59.9)	20.0 (68.0)	24.9 (76.8)	28.0 (82.4)	27.8 (82.0)	23.9 (75.0)	18.6 (65.5)	14.0 (57.2)	10.2 (50.4)	17.8 (64.1)
Mean daily minimum °C (°F)	3.1 (37.6)	3.9 (39.0)	5.6 (42.1)	8.1 (46.6)	12.2 (54.0)	16.9 (62.4)	19.7 (67.5)	19.7 (67.5)	16.4 (61.5)	11.7 (53.1)	7.8 (46.0)	4.4 (39.9)	10.8 (51.4)
Record low °C (°F)	−5.3 (22.5)	−4.2 (24.4)	−4.6 (23.7)	−0.7 (30.7)	6.2 (43.2)	9.4 (48.9)	14.2 (57.6)	13.1 (55.6)	9.1 (48.4)	1.5 (34.7)	−1.7 (28.9)	−5.2 (22.6)	−5.3 (22.5)
Average rainfall mm (inches)	124.6 (4.91)	80.5 (3.17)	59.9 (2.36)	32.2 (1.27)	25.1 (0.99)	32.0 (1.26)	10.4 (0.41)	19.9 (0.78)	51.2 (2.02)	59.4 (2.34)	91.9 (3.62)	97.4 (3.83)	684.5 (26.96)
Source: National Observatory of Athens (Feb 2009 - Aug 2025), Sparta N.O.A station, World Meteorological Organization

== History ==
=== Mythology and early history ===
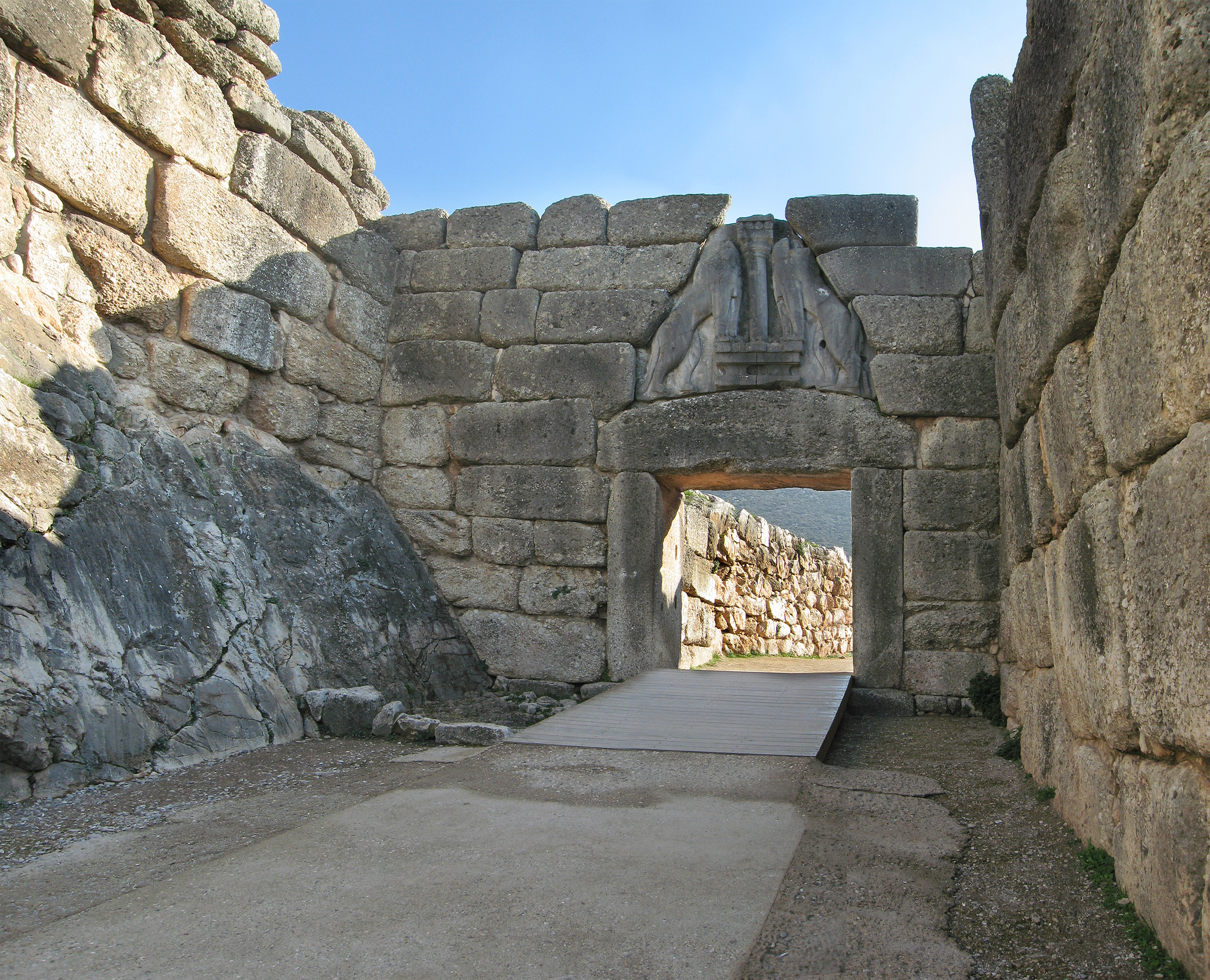
The Lion Gate in Mycenae

The peninsula has been inhabited since prehistoric times. Its modern name derives from ancient Greek mythology, specifically the legend of the hero Pelops, who was said to have conquered the entire region. The name Peloponnesos means Island or Peninsula (archaic meaning of the word nesos) of Pelops.

The Mycenaean civilization, mainland Greece's (and Europe's) first major civilization, dominated the Peloponnese in the Bronze Age from the palaces of Mycenae, Pylos, and Tiryns, among others. Many figures from Greek mythology, including Heracles and Perseus, as well as stories like the Iliad and – more broadly – the Trojan War, are associated with this period. The Mycenaean civilization collapsed suddenly at the end of the 2nd millennium BC. Archeological research has found that many of its cities and palaces show signs of destruction. The subsequent period, known as the Greek Dark Ages, is marked by an absence of written records.

=== Archaic period ===
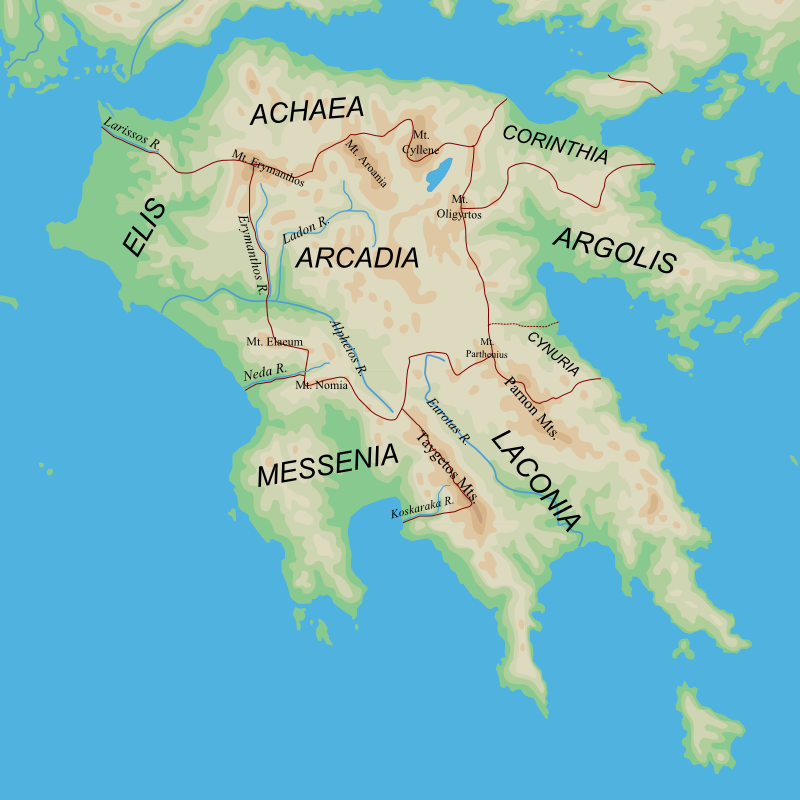
A map of the regions of the Peloponnese in classical antiquity

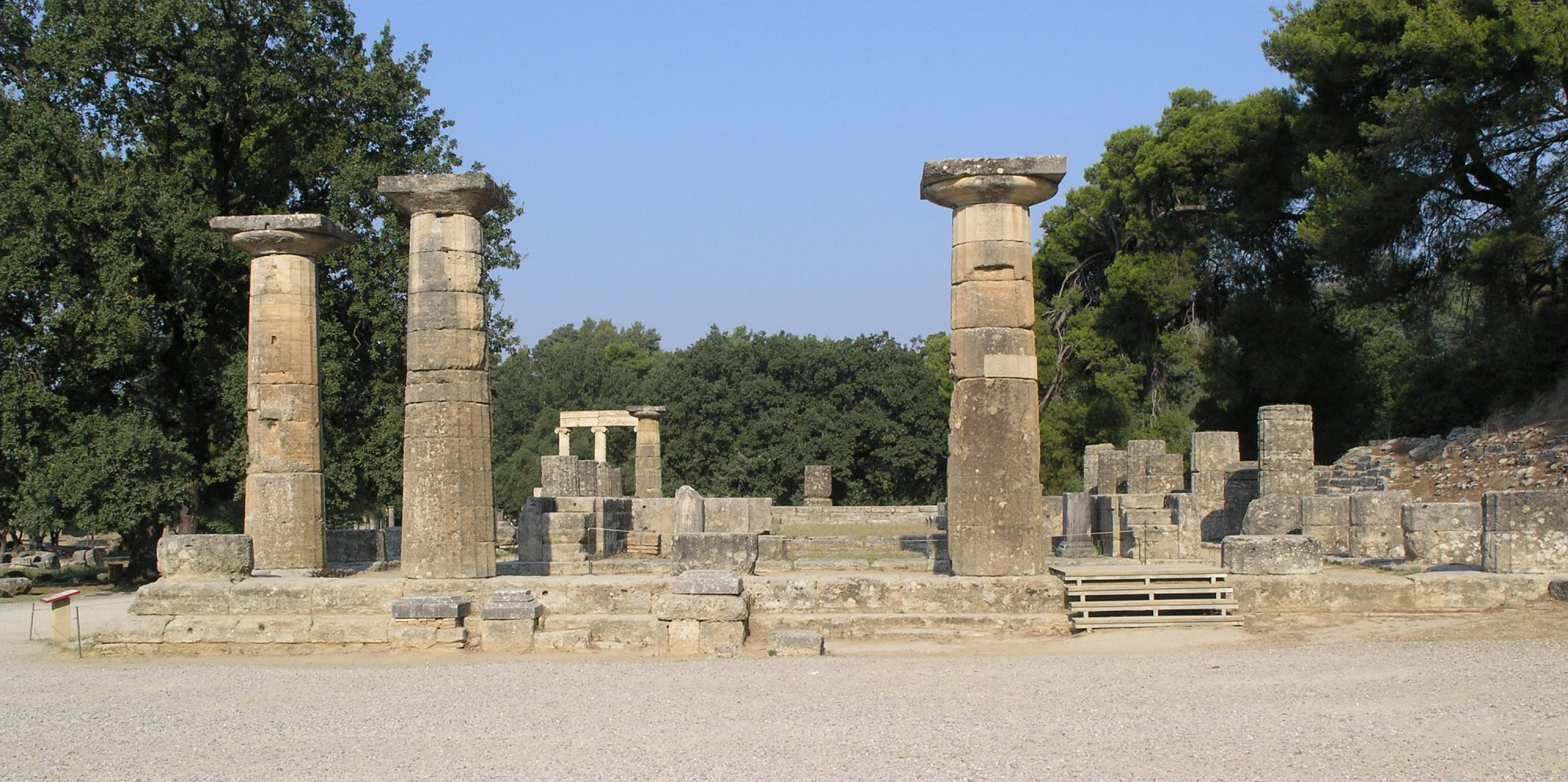
The Temple of Hera, Olympia

In 776 BC, the first Olympic Games were held at Olympia, in Elis in western Peloponnese, and this date is sometimes used to denote the beginning of the classical period of Greek antiquity. During classical antiquity, the Peloponnese was at the heart of the affairs of ancient Greece, possessed some of its most powerful city-states, and was the location of some of its bloodiest battles. The major cities of Argos, Corinth and Sparta were located on the Peloponnese.

In the 6th centrury BC, Sparta established its hegemony over most of the Peloponnese by founding the Peloponnesian League.

=== Classical period ===
Soldiers from the peninsula fought in the Persian Wars at the battles of Thermopylae under Leonidas, Salamis under Themistocles, and Plataea under Pausanias. The Peloponnesian League under Spartan leadership defeated the Athenians at the Peloponnesian War of 431–404 BC. The entire Peloponnese, with the notable exception of Sparta (which was forced to join later in 331 BC), joined Philip's League of Corinth in 338 BC and the following expedition of Alexander the Great against the Persian Empire.

=== Hellenistic period ===
Along with the rest of Greece, the Achaean League fell to the expanding Roman Republic in 146 BC, when the Romans razed the city of Corinth and massacred its inhabitants. The Romans established the province of Achaea, comprising the Peloponnese and most of central Greece.

During the Roman period, the peninsula remained prosperous but became a provincial backwater, relatively disengaged from the affairs of the wider Roman world.

=== Middle Ages ===
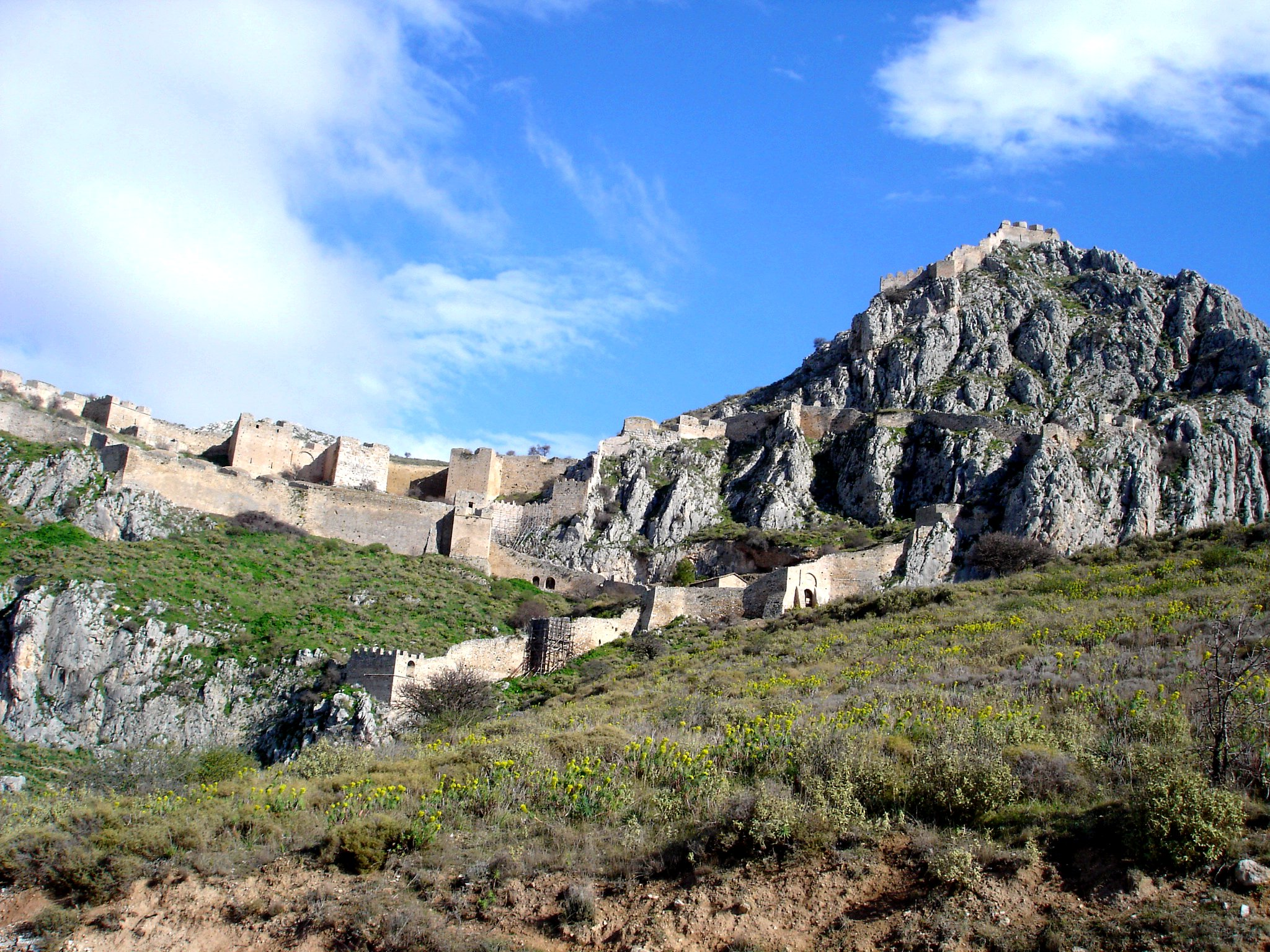
View of the Acrocorinth

==== Byzantine rule ====
After the partition of the Empire in 395, the Peloponnese became a part of the Byzantine Empire. The devastation of Alaric's raid in 396–397 led to the construction of the Hexamilion wall across the Isthmus of Corinth. Throughout the major part of late antiquity, the peninsula retained its urbanized character: in the 6th century, Hierocles counted 26 cities in his Synecdemus. By the latter part of that century, however, building activity seems to have stopped virtually everywhere except in Constantinople, Thessalonica, Corinth, and Athens. This has traditionally been attributed to calamities such as plague, earthquakes, and Slavic invasions. However, more recent analysis suggests that urban decline was closely linked with the collapse of long-distance and regional commercial networks that underpinned and supported late antique urbanism in Greece, as well as with the generalized withdrawal of imperial troops and administration from the Balkans.

===== Slavic settlement and Theme of the Peloponnese =====
The scale of the Slavic "invasion" and settlement in the 7th and 8th centuries remains a matter of dispute, although it is nowadays considered much smaller than previously thought. The Slavs did occupy most of the peninsula, as evidenced by the abundance of Slavic toponyms, but these toponyms accumulated over centuries rather than as a result of an initial "flood" of Slavic invasions, and many appear to have been mediated by speakers of Greek, or in mixed Slavic-Greek compounds.

Fewer Slavic toponyms appear on the eastern coast, which remained in Byzantine hands and was included in the thema of Hellas, established by Byzantine emperor Justinian II c. 690. While traditional historiography has dated the arrival of Slavs to southern Greece to the late 6th century, according to Florin Curta, there is no evidence for a Slavic presence in the Peloponnese until after c. 700 AD, when Slavs may have been allowed to settle in specific areas that had been depopulated.

Relations between the Slavs and Greeks were probably peaceful apart from intermittent uprisings. There was also a continuity of the Peloponnesian Greek population. This is especially true in Mani and Tsakonia, where Slavic incursions were minimal or non-existent. Considering their predominantly agricultural economy and rural lifestyle, the Slavs probably traded with the Greeks, who remained in the towns, while Greek villages continued to exist in the interior, governing themselves, possibly paying tribute to the Slavs. The first attempt by the Byzantine imperial government to reassert its control over the independent Slavic tribes of the Peloponnese occurred in 783, with the logothete Staurakios' overland campaign from Constantinople into Greece and the Peloponnese, which, according to Theophanes the Confessor, captured many prisoners and forced the Slavs to pay tribute.

A map of Byzantine Greece c. 900 AD, with the themes and major settlements

From the mid-9th century, in the aftermath of a Slavic revolt and attack on Patras, a process of Hellenization was carried out overwhelmingly and persistently. According to the Chronicle of Monemvasia, in 805, the Byzantine governor of Corinth went to war with the Slavs, exterminated them, and allowed the original inhabitants to claim their lands. They regained control of the city of Patras, and the region was resettled with Greeks. Many Slavs were transported to Asia Minor, and many Asian, Sicilian, and Calabrian Greeks were resettled in the Peloponnese. By the turn of the 9th century, the entire Peloponnese was formed into the new thema of Peloponnesos, with its capital at Corinth.

The imposition of Byzantine rule over the Slavic enclaves may have largely been a process of Christianization and accommodation of Slavic chieftains into the Imperial fold, considering that literary, epigraphic, and sigillographic evidence corroborate Slavic archontes participating in Imperial affairs. By the end of the 9th century, the Peloponnese was culturally and administratively Greek again, except for a few small Slavic tribes in the mountains such as the Melingoi and Ezeritai. Although they were to remain relatively autonomous until Ottoman times, such tribes were the exception rather than the rule. Even the Melingoi and Ezeritai, however, could speak Greek and appear to have been Christian.

The success of the Hellenization campaign also shows that the Slavs had settled among many Greeks, in contrast to areas further north in what is now Bulgaria and the former Yugoslavia, as those areas could not be Hellenized when they were recovered by the Byzantines in the early 11th century. A human genetics study in 2017 showed that the Peloponnesians have little admixture with populations of the Slavic homeland and are much closer to Sicilians and southern Italians.

Apart from the troubled relations with the Slavs, the coastal regions of the Peloponnese suffered greatly from repeated Arab raids following the Arab capture of Crete in the 820s and the establishment of a corsair emirate there. After the island was recovered by Byzantium in 961, however, the region entered a period of renewed prosperity, where agriculture, commerce, and urban industry flourished. The Byzantine empress Theophano, the mother of Basil II, originated from Laconia in Peloponnese.

==== Frankish rule and Byzantine reconquest ====
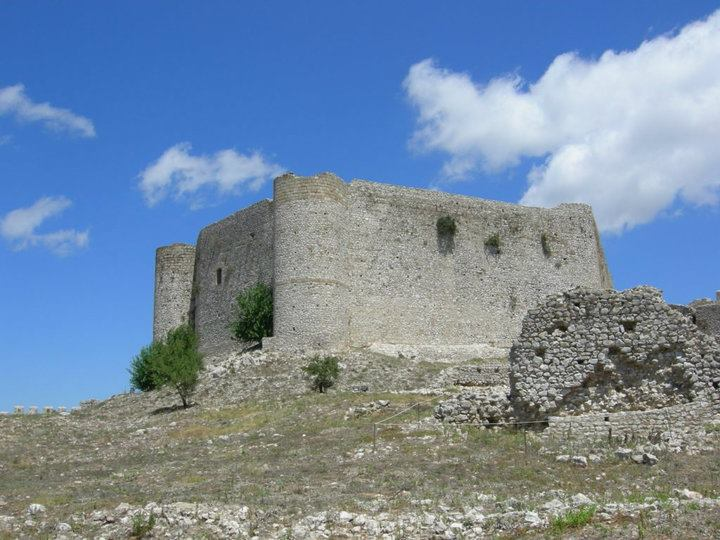
The Frankish castle of Clairmont (Chlemoutsi)

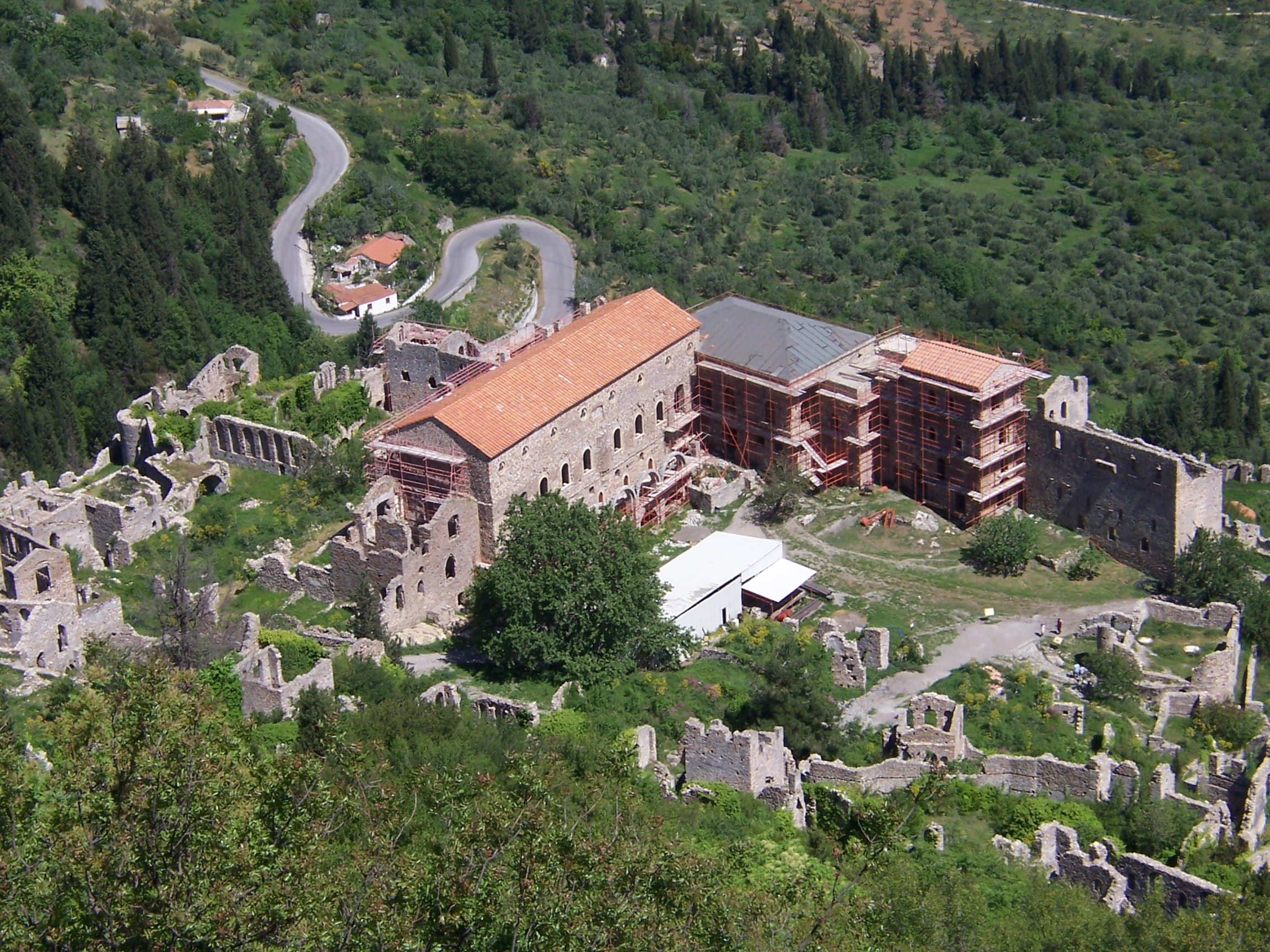
The court of the Byzantine despots in Mystras, now a UNESCO World Heritage Site

In 1205, following the destruction of the Byzantine Empire by the forces of the Fourth Crusade, the Crusaders under William of Champlitte and Geoffrey of Villehardouin marched south through mainland Greece and conquered the Peloponnese against sporadic local Greek resistance. The Franks then founded the Principality of Achaea, nominally a vassal of the Latin Empire, while the Venetians occupied several strategically important ports around the coast, such as Navarino and Coron, which they retained into the 15th century. The Franks popularized the name Morea for the peninsula, which first appears as the name of a small bishopric in Elis during the 10th century. Its etymology is disputed, but it is most commonly held to be derived from the mulberry tree (morea), whose leaves are similar in shape to the peninsula.

In 1208, William I founded a commission at Andravida, consisting of Latin bishops, two bannerets, five Greek magnates, and chaired by himself, to assess the land and divide it, according to Latin practice, in fiefs. As a result, the country was divided into twelve baronies, mostly centred around a newly constructed castle—a testament to the fact that the Franks were a military elite amidst a potentially hostile Greek population. The twelve temporal barons were joined by seven ecclesiastic lords, headed by the Latin Archbishop of Patras. Each of the latter was granted several estates as knightly fiefs, with the Archbishop receiving eight, the other bishops four each, and likewise four granted to each of the military orders: the Templars, Hospitallers, and the Teutonic Knights. Shortly after 1260, a thirteenth barony, that of Arcadia (modern Kyparissia), was established, which was also a personal fief of the Geoffrey I of Villehardouin. The barons retained considerable powers and privileges, so that the Prince was not an absolute sovereign but rather a "first among equals" among them. Thus they had the right to construct a castle without the Prince's permission, or to decree capital punishment. Since Salic Law was not adopted in Achaea, women could also inherit the fiefs.

==== Despotate of Morea and Ottoman incursions ====
Frankish supremacy in the peninsula, however, received a critical blow after the Battle of Pelagonia, when William II of Villehardouin was forced to cede the newly constructed fortress and palace at Mystras near ancient Sparta to a resurgent Byzantium. At this point, the emperor concluded an agreement with the captive prince: William and his men would be set free in exchange for an oath of fealty, and for the cession of Monemvasia, Grand Magne, and Mystras. The handover was effected in 1262, and henceforth Mystras was the seat of the governor of the Byzantine territories in the Morea. Initially this governor (kephale) was changed every year, but after 1308 they started being appointed for longer terms. Almost immediately on his return to the Morea, William of Villehardouin renounced his oath to the emperor, and warfare broke out between Byzantines and Franks. The first Byzantine attempts to subdue the Principality of Achaea were beaten back in the battles of Prinitsa and Makryplagi, but the Byzantines were firmly ensconced in Laconia. Warfare became endemic, and the Byzantines slowly pushed the Franks back. The insecurity engendered by the raids and counter-raids caused the inhabitants of Lacedaemon to abandon their exposed city and settle at Mystras, in a new town built under the shadow of the fortress.

While Mystras served as the provincial capital from this time, it became a royal capital in 1349, when the first despot was appointed to rule over the Morea. The Byzantine Emperor John VI Kantakouzenos, reorganized the territory in 1349 to establish it as an appanage for his son, the Despot Manuel Kantakouzenos. Around that time, the Ottoman Turks began raiding the Peloponnese, but their raids intensified only after 1387 when the energetic Evrenos Bey took control. Exploiting the quarrels between Byzantines and Franks, he plundered across the peninsula and forced both the Byzantine despots and the remaining Frankish rulers to acknowledge Ottoman suzerainty and pay tribute. This situation lasted until the Ottoman defeat at the Battle of Ankara in 1402, after which Ottoman power was for a time checked. From 1349 until its surrender to the Ottoman Turks on 31 May 1460, Mystras was the residence of a Despot who ruled over the Byzantine Morea, known as the "Despotate of the Morea". For the larger portion of his reign, Manuel maintained peaceful relations with his Latin neighbors and secured a long period of prosperity for the area. Greco-Latin cooperation included an alliance to contain the raids of the Ottoman Sultan Murad I into Morea in the 1360s. The rival Palaiologos dynasty seized the Morea after Manuel's death in 1380, with Theodore I Palaiologos becoming despot in 1383.

Theodore I ruled until 1407, consolidating Byzantine rule and coming to terms with his more powerful neighbours—particularly the expansionist Ottoman Empire, whose suzerainty he recognised. Subsequent despots were the sons of the Emperor Manuel II Palaiologos, brother of the despot Theodore: Theodore II, Constantine, Demetrios, and Thomas. As Latin power in the Peloponnese waned during the 15th century, the Despotate of the Morea expanded to incorporate the entire peninsula in 1430 with territory being acquired by dowry settlements, and the conquest of Patras by Constantine Palaiologos, the last Byzantine emperor. However, in 1446 the Ottoman Sultan Murad II destroyed the Byzantine defences—the Hexamilion wall at the Isthmus of Corinth. His attack opened the peninsula to invasion, though Murad died before he could exploit this. His successor Mehmed II "the Conqueror" captured the Byzantine capital Constantinople in 1453. The despots, Demetrios Palaiologos and Thomas Palaiologos, brothers of the last emperor, failed to send him any aid, as Morea was recovering from a recent Ottoman attack. Their own incompetence resulted in the Morea revolt of 1453–1454, led by Manuel Kantakouzenos against them, during which they invited in Ottoman troops to help them put down the revolt. At this time, the Greek archons made peace with Mehmed. After several years of incompetent rule by the despots, their failure to pay their annual tribute to the Sultan, and finally their own revolt against Ottoman rule, Mehmed came into the Morea in May 1460. Demetrios ended up a prisoner of the Ottomans, and his younger brother Thomas fled. By the end of the summer, the Ottomans had achieved the submission of virtually all cities held by the Greeks.

Ottoman incursions into the Morea resumed under Turahan Bey after 1423. Despite the reconstruction of the Hexamilion wall at the Isthmus of Corinth, the Ottomans under Murad II breached it in 1446, forcing the Despots of the Morea to re-acknowledge Ottoman suzerainty, and again under Turahan in 1452 and 1456. Following the occupation of the Duchy of Athens in 1456, the Ottomans occupied a third of the Peloponnese in 1458, and Sultan Mehmed II extinguished the remnants of the Despotate in 1460. A few holdouts remained for a time. The rocky peninsula of Monemvasia refused to surrender, and it was first ruled for a brief time by a Catalan corsair. When the population drove him out, they obtained the consent of Thomas to submit to the Pope's protection before the end of 1460. The Mani Peninsula at the south end of the Morea resisted under a loose coalition of the local clans, and that area then came under Venice's rule. The last holdout was Salmeniko, in the Morea's northwest. Graitzas Palaiologos was the military commander there, stationed at Salmeniko Castle. While the town eventually surrendered, Graitzas and his garrison and some town residents held out in the castle until July 1461, when they escaped and reached Venetian territory. Only the Venetian fortresses of Modon, Coron, Navarino, Monemvasia, Argos and Nauplion escaped Ottoman control.

==== Albanian migration, settlement and relocations to Italy ====
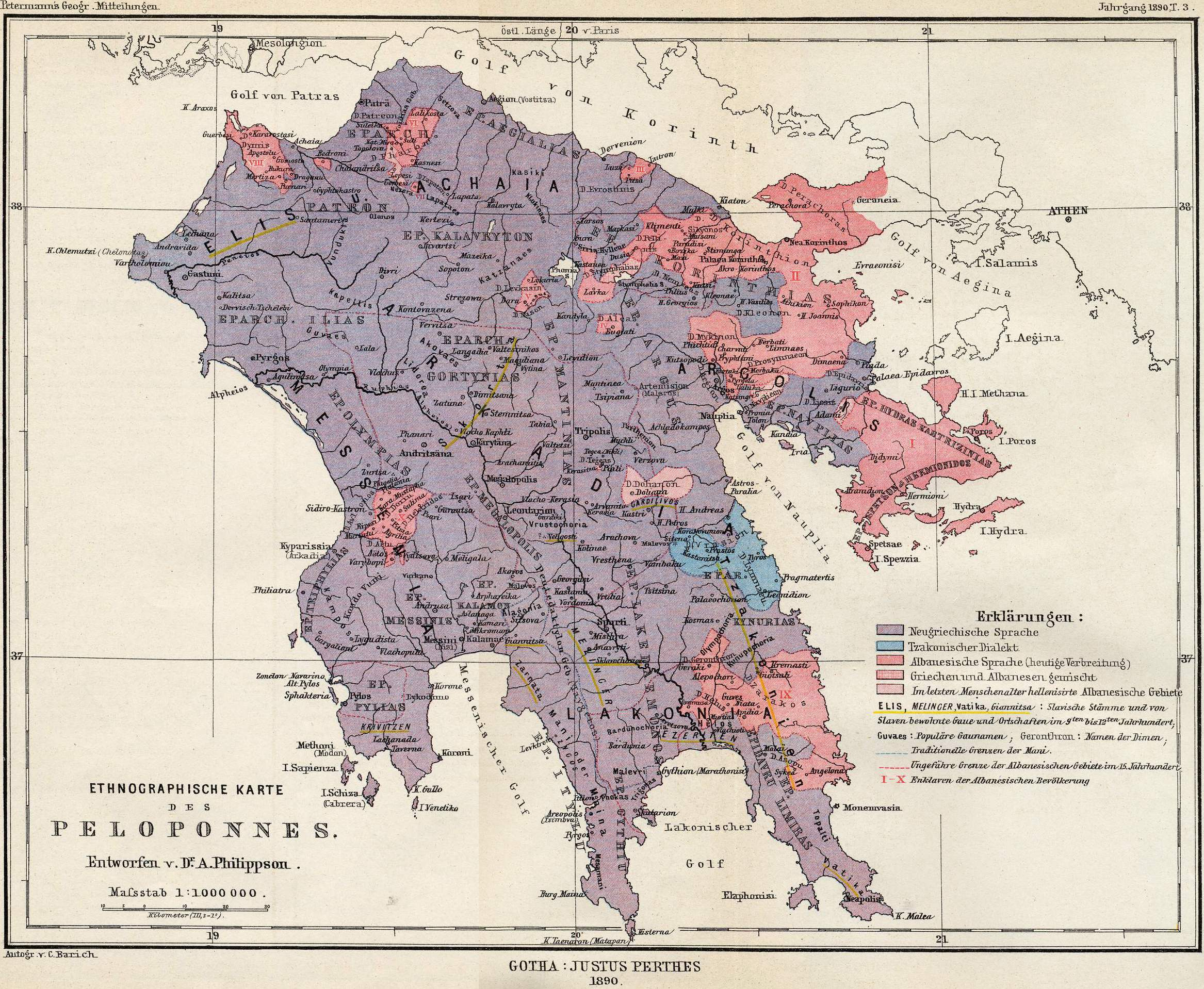
Ethnographic map of the Peloponnese, 1890

The same period was also marked by the migration and settlement of Christian Albanians to parts of Central Greece and the Peloponnese, a group that eventually became known as the Arvanites The Albanians settled in successive waves, often invited by the local rulers. They start appearing more frequently in the historical record from during the second part of the 14th century, when they were being offered arable land, pasture and favorable taxation in exchange for military service. One of the larger groups of Albanian settlers, amounting to 10,000, settled the Peloponnese during the reign of Theodore I Palaiologos, first in Arcadia and subsequently in other regions around Messenia, Argolis, Elis and Achaia. Around 1418, a second large group arrived, possibly fleeing Aetolia, Acarnania and Arta, where Albanian political power had been defeated. The settling Albanians lived in tribes spread out into small villages, practicing nomadic lifestyles based on pastoralism and animal husbandry. By the mid-15th century, they formed a substantial part of the population of the Peloponnesus. In the second half of the 15th century, Albanians constituted at least one-third of the population of the Peloponnese. Military sources of the era (1425) report about 30,000 Albanian men who could carry arms in the Peloponnese. The Greeks tended to live in large villages and cities, while Albanians in small villages.

Following Ottoman conquest, many Albanians fled to Italy, settling primarily in nowadays Arbereshe villages of Calabria and Sicily. On the other hand, in an effort to control the remaining Albanians, during the second half of the 15th century, the Ottomans adopted favorable tax policies towards them, likely in continuation of similar Byzantine practices. This policy had been discontinued by the early 16th century. Throughout the Ottoman–Venetian wars, many Albanians died or were captured in service to the Venetians; at Nafpaktos, Nafplio, Argos, Methoni, Koroni and Pylos. Furthermore, 8,000 Albanian stratioti, most of them along with their families, left the Peloponnese to continue their military service under the Republic of Venice or the Kingdom of Naples. At the end of the Ottoman–Venetian wars, a large number of Albanians had fled from the Peloponnese to Sicily.

A demographic census by Alfred Philippson, based on fieldwork between 1887 and 1889, found that out of the approximately 730,000 inhabitants of the Peloponnese, and the three neighboring islands of Poros, Hydra and Spetses, Arvanites numbered 90,253, or 12.3% of the total population.

=== Ottoman conquest, Venetian interlude and Ottoman reconquest ===
The Venetian fortresses were conquered in a series of Ottoman-Venetian Wars: the first war, lasting from 1463 to 1479, saw much fighting in the Peloponnese, resulting in the loss of Argos, while Modon and Coron fell in 1500 during the second war. Coron and Patras were captured in a crusading expedition in 1532, led by the Genoese admiral Andrea Doria, but this provoked another war in which the last Venetian possessions on the Greek mainland were lost.

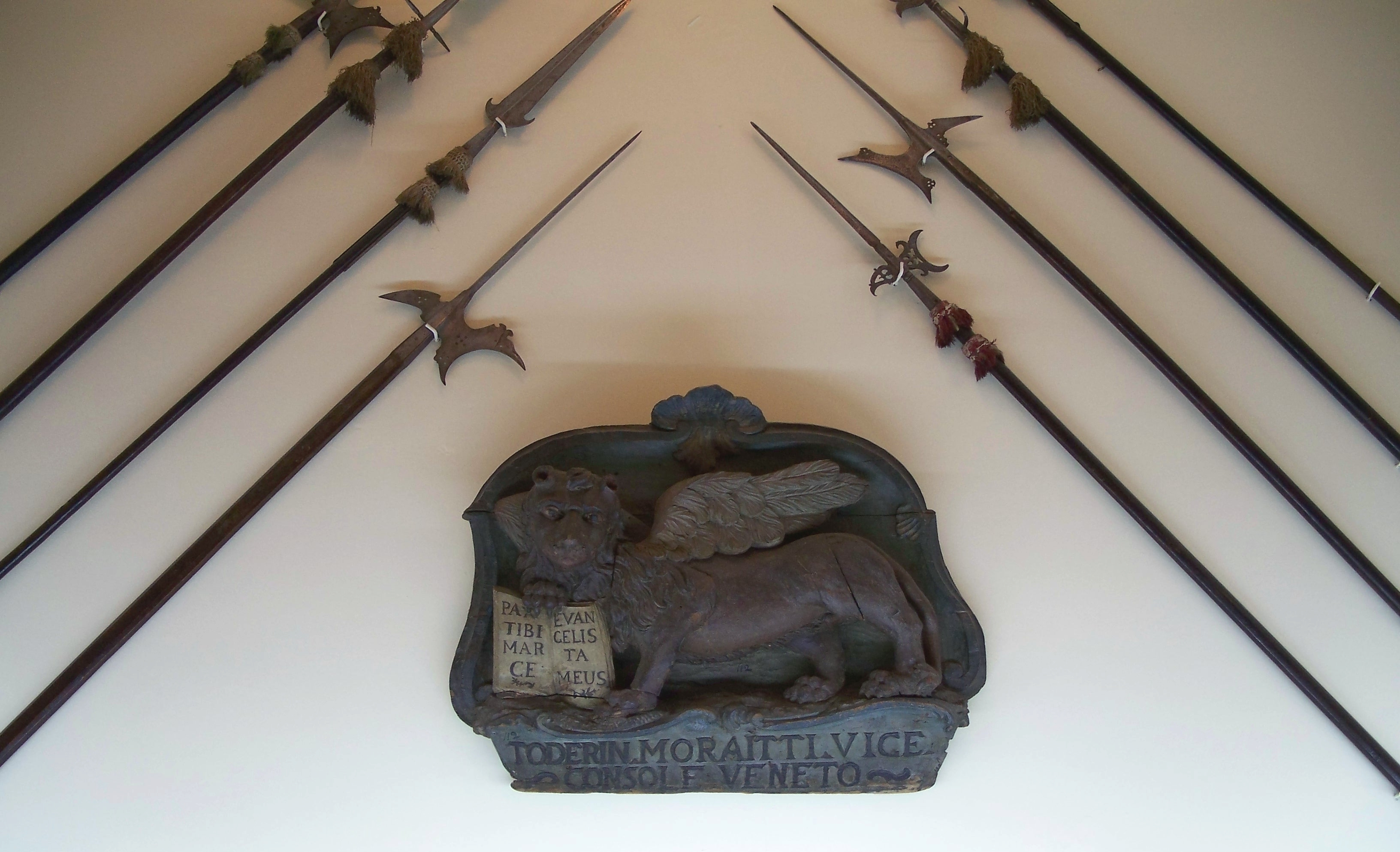
The Venetian Lion of Saint Mark and halberds from the time of the Kingdom of the Morea in the National Historical Museum, Athens

Following the Ottoman conquest, the peninsula was made into a province (sanjak), with 109 ziamets and 342 timars. During the first period of Ottoman rule (1460–1687), the capital was first in Corinth (Turk. Gördes), later in Leontari (Londari), Mystras (Misistire) and finally in Nauplion (Anaboli). Sometime in the mid-17th century, the Morea became the centre of a separate eyalet, with Patras (Ballibadra) as its capital. Until the death of Suleiman the Magnificent in 1570, the Christian population (counted at some 42,000 families c. 1550) managed to retain some privileges and Islamization was slow, mostly among the Albanians or the estate owners who were integrated into the Ottoman feudal system.

Although they quickly came to control most of the fertile lands, Muslims remained a distinct minority. Christian communities retained a large measure of self-government, but the entire Ottoman period was marked by a flight of the Christian population from the plains to the mountains. This occasioned the rise of the klephts, armed brigands and rebels, in the mountains, as well as the corresponding institution of the government-funded armatoloi to check the klephts' activities.

With the outbreak of the "Great Turkish War" in 1683, the Venetians under Francesco Morosini occupied the entire peninsula by 1687, and received recognition by the Ottomans in the Treaty of Karlowitz (1699). The Venetians established their province as the "Kingdom of the Morea" (It. Regno di Morea), but their rule proved unpopular, and when the Ottomans invaded the peninsula in 1715, most local Greeks welcomed them. The Ottoman reconquest was easy and swift, and was recognized by Venice in the Treaty of Passarowitz in 1718.

The Peloponnese now became the core of the Morea Eyalet, headed by the Mora valesi, who until 1780 was a pasha of the first rank (with three horsetails) and held the title of vizier. After 1780 and until the Greek War of Independence, the province was headed by a muhassil. The pasha of the Morea was aided by several subordinate officials, including a Christian translator (dragoman), who was the senior Christian official of the province. As during the first Ottoman period, the Morea was divided into 22 districts or beyliks. The capital was first at Nauplion, but after 1786 at Tripolitza (Tr. Trabliçe).

=== Orlov Revolt ===
The Greeks of the Peloponnese rose against the Ottomans with Russian aid during the so-called "Orlov Revolt" of 1770, but it was swiftly and brutally suppressed by bands of Muslim Albanian mercenaries hired by the Ottomans. Referred to by the local Greek populace as "Turk-Albanians", those forces had also destroyed many cities and towns in Epirus during the 1769–70 revolt there. The Peloponnese suffered more than any other Greek inhabited area by irregular Albanian gangs during the decades following. In Patras nearly no one was left alive after the Turkish-Albanian invasion. The city of Mystras was left in ruins and the metropolitan bishop Ananias was executed despite having saved the life of several Turks during the uprising. A great number of local Greeks were killed by the Albanian groups, while children were sold to slavery. It is estimated that 20,000 local Greeks were captured during those nine years of devastation by those Albanian mercenaries and sold to slave markets. Also, an additional 50,000 Greeks left the Peloponnese, around one-sixth of the pre-1770 population.

The Ottoman government was unable to pay the wages the Albanian mercenaries demanded for their service, causing the latter to ravage the region even after revolt had been put down. 1770-1779 was a prolonged period of devastation and atrocities committed by Albanian irregulars in the Peloponnese. In 1774 the Russo-Turkish War ended with the Treaty of Küçük Kaynarca which granted general amnesty to the population. Nevertheless, attacks by Muslim Albanian mercenaries in the region continued not only against the Greek population but also against Turks. The extensive destruction and lack of control in the Peloponnese forced the central Ottoman government to send a regular Turkish military force to suppress those Albanian troops in 1779, and eventually drive them out from Peloponnese. As a result of the invasion by those mercenary groups, the local population found refuge in the mountains of Peloponnese to avoid persecution. The total population decreased during this time, while the Muslim element in it increased.

As such Greek resistance in the peninsula was reinforced and powerful groups of klephts were formed under the clans of Zacharias, Melios, Petmezas and Kolokotronis. Klephtic songs of that era describe the resistance activities. Nevertheless, through the privileges granted with the Treaty of Kuchuk-Kainarji, especially the right for the Christians to trade under the Russian flag, led to a considerable economic flowering of the local Greeks, which, coupled with the increased cultural contacts with Western Europe (Modern Greek Enlightenment) and the inspiring ideals of the French Revolution, laid the groundwork for the Greek War of Independence.

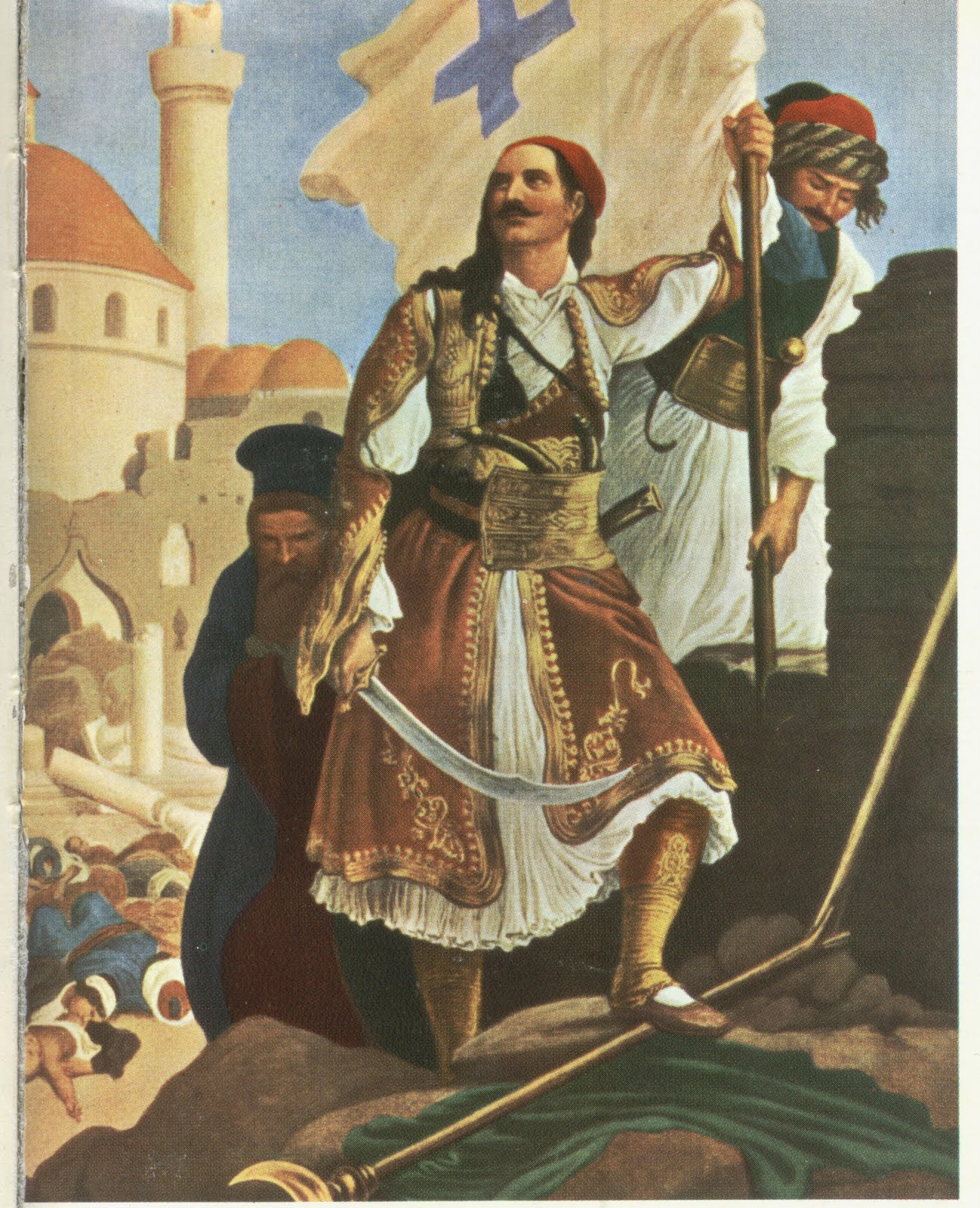
"Commander Panagiotis Kephalas plants the flag of liberty upon the walls of Tripolizza", Siege of Tripolitsa, by Peter von Hess

The flag of the revolutionaries in the Peloponnese raised by the Kolokotronis family during 1821, and commonly (though unofficially) associated with the Peloponnese region

=== Greek Revolution ===
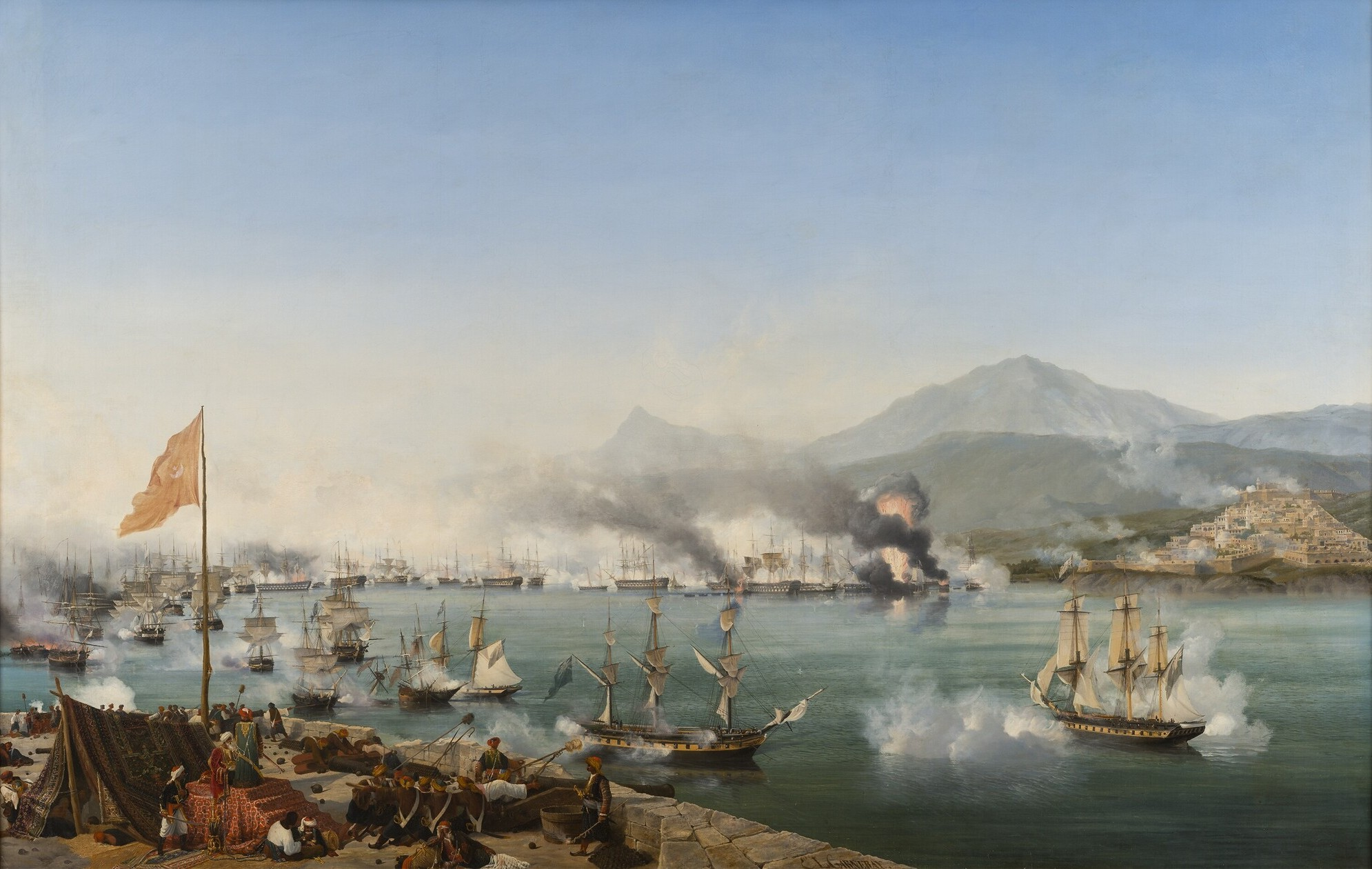
The Battle of Navarino, in October 1827, marked the effective end of Ottoman rule in Greece.

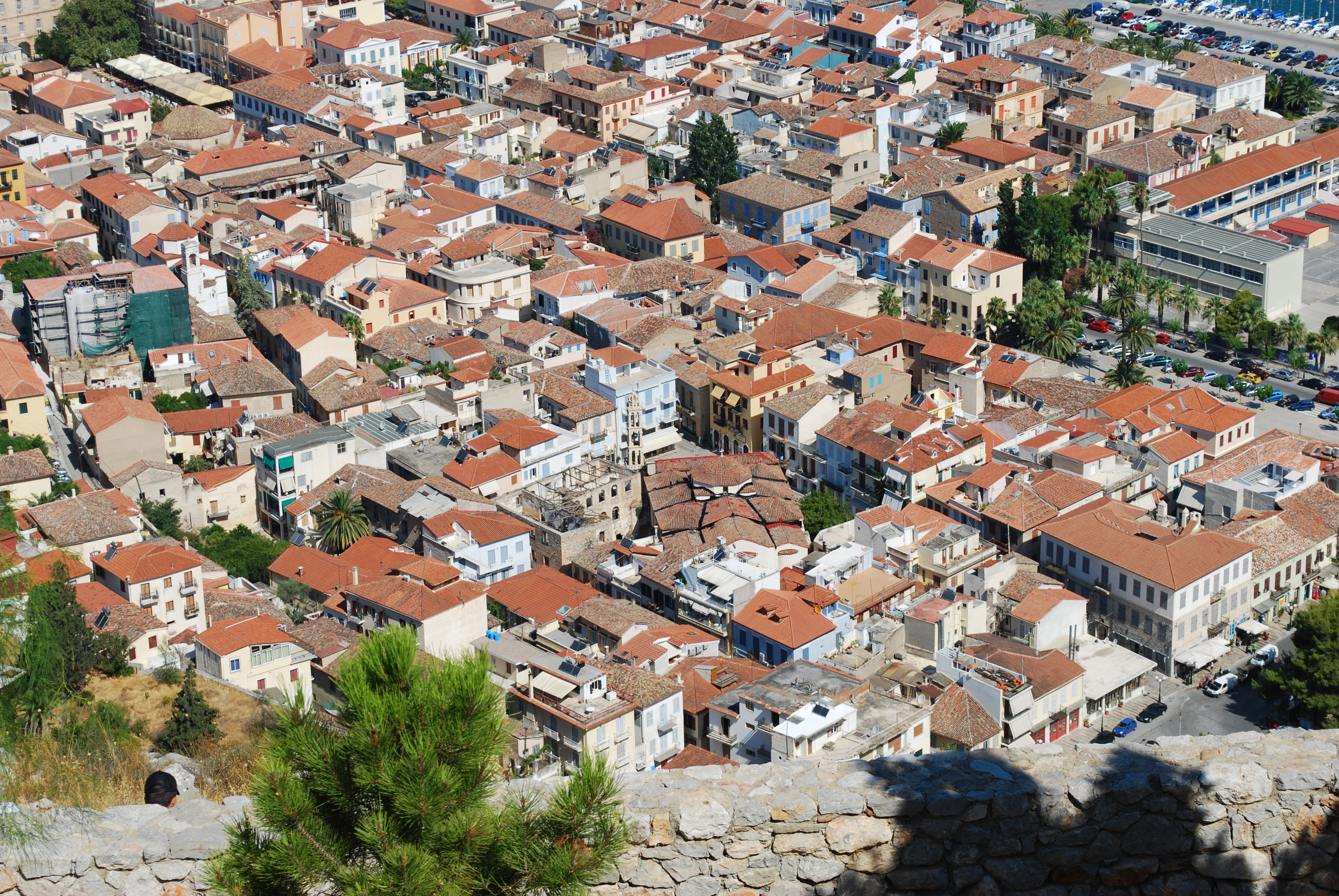
Panoramic view of Nafplion, the first capital of modern Greece

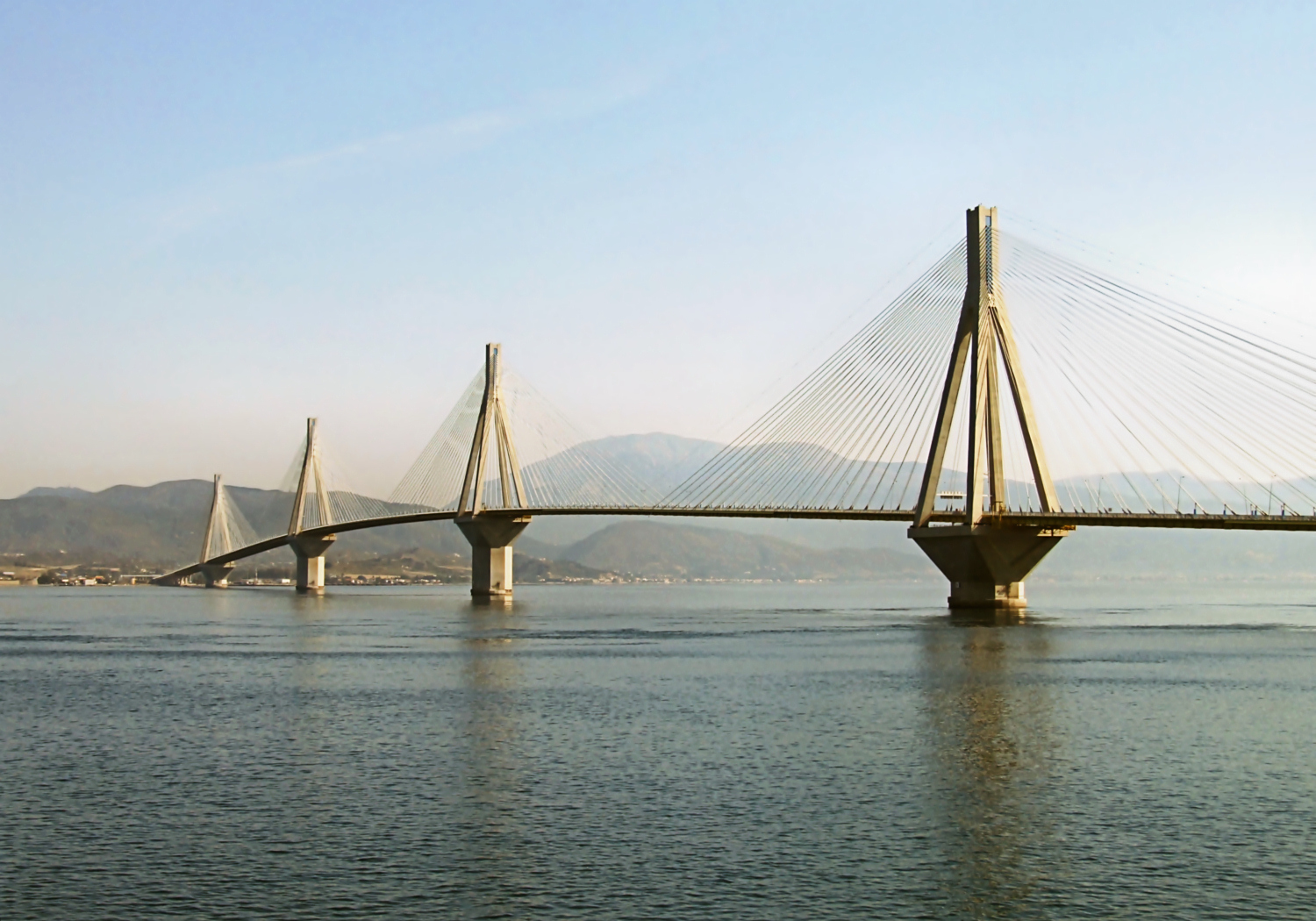
The Rio–Antirrio bridge, completed in 2004, links the western Peloponnese with mainland Greece.

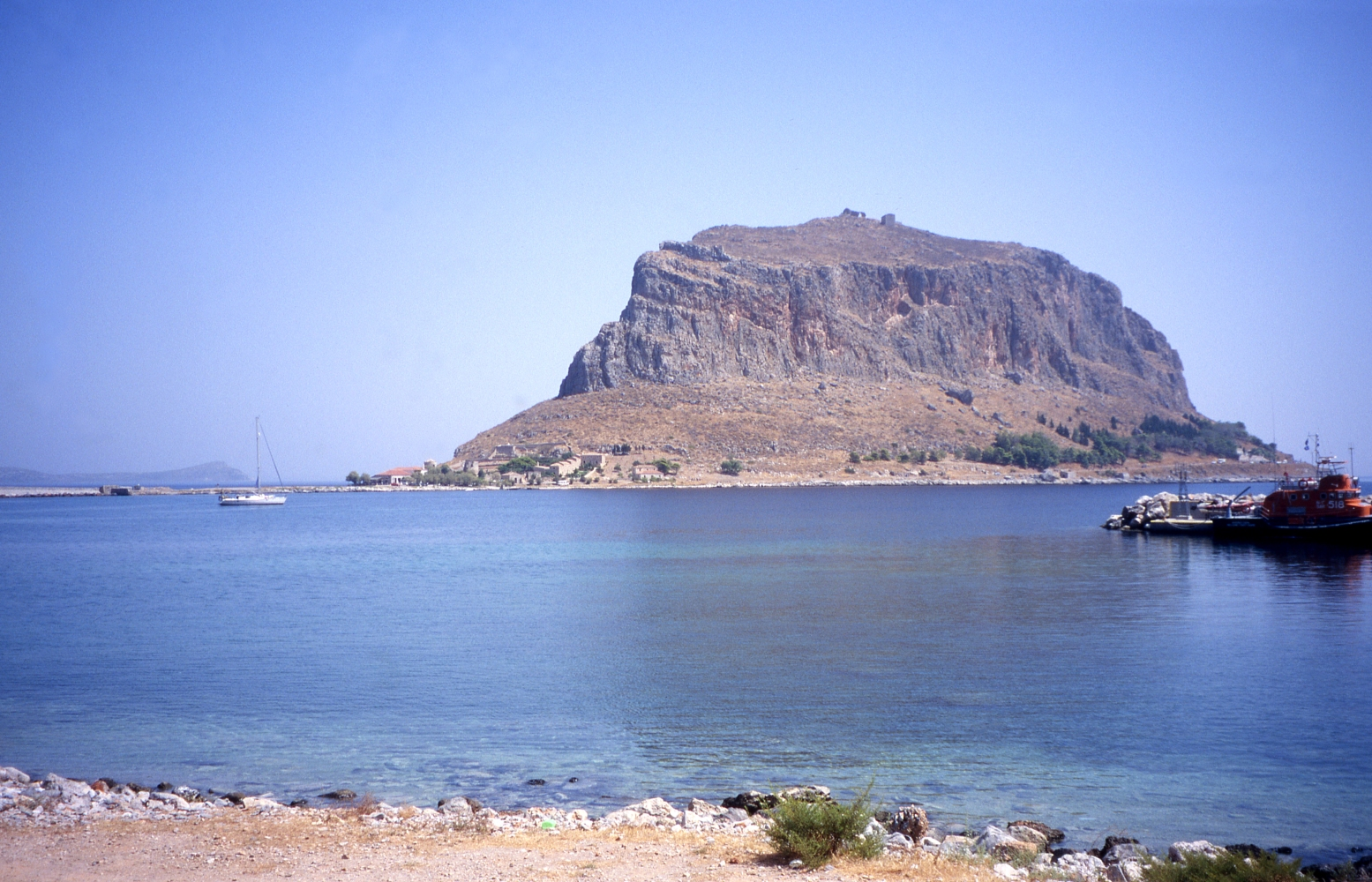
The rock of Monemvasia

The Peloponnesians played a major role in the Greek War of Independence – the war began in the Peloponnese, when Maniots and other Greek rebels took control of Kalamata on 23 March 1821. After the arrival of Ypsilantis's emissaries, local people rose under the leadership of Mavromichalis. Greek and Albanian insurgents organised in units of armed civilians took control of most of the fortresses. The Greek insurgents made rapid progress and the entire peninsula was under Greek control within a few months, except for a few coastal forts and the main Turkish garrison at Tripolitsa. The fighting was fierce and marked by atrocities on both sides; eventually the entire Muslim population was either massacred or fled to the forts. The capture of Tripolitsa by Theodoros Kolokotronis in September 1821 marked a turning point. Short of men and money, the Ottoman state turned to hiring Albanian tribesmen to fight the Greeks, and by 1823, the bulk of the Ottoman forces in Greece were Albanian mercenaries hired for a campaigning season rather than the Ottoman Army. Rivalries among the insurgents eventually erupted into civil war in 1824, which enabled the Ottoman Egyptian vassal Ibrahim Pasha to land in the peninsula in 1825.

The Peloponnese peninsula was the scene of fierce fighting and extensive devastation following the arrival of Ibrahim's Egyptian troops. Partly as a result of the atrocities committed by Ibrahim, the UK, France, and the Russian Empire decided to intervene in favor of the Greeks. The decisive naval Battle of Navarino was fought in 1827 off Pylos on the west coast of the Peloponnese, where a combined British, French and Russian fleet decisively defeated the Turko-Egyptian fleet. Subsequently, a French expeditionary corps cleared the last Turko-Egyptian forces from the peninsula in 1828. The city of Nafplion, on the east coast of the peninsula, became the first capital of the independent Greek state. By the conclusion of the war, the entire Muslim population of the newly independent Greek state, including the Peloponnese, had been exterminated or had fled.

=== Modern Greece ===
During the 19th and early 20th centuries, the region became relatively poor and economically isolated. A significant part of its population emigrated to the larger cities of Greece, especially Athens, and other countries such as the United States and Australia. It was badly affected by the Second World War and Greek Civil War, experiencing some of the worst atrocities committed in Greece during those conflicts. Living standards improved dramatically throughout Greece after the country acceded to the European Union in 1981.

The Corinth Canal was completed in the late 19th century, linking the Aegean Sea with the Gulf of Corinth and the Ionian. In 2001, the Rio-Antirio Bridge was completed, linking the western Peloponnese to western Greece. In late August 2007, large parts of Peloponnese suffered from wildfires, which caused severe damage in villages and forests and the death of 77 people. The impact of the fires to the environment and economy of the region are still unknown. It is thought to be one of the largest environmental disasters in modern Greek history.

== Regional units ==
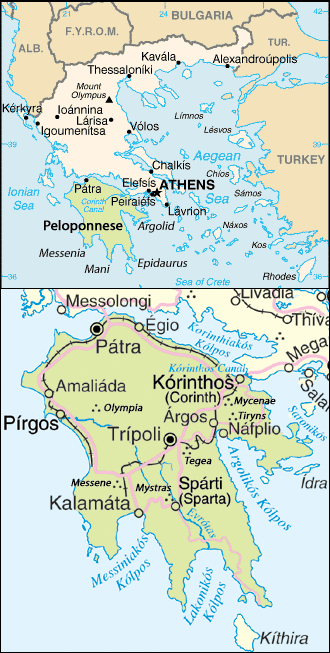
The Peloponnese within Greece

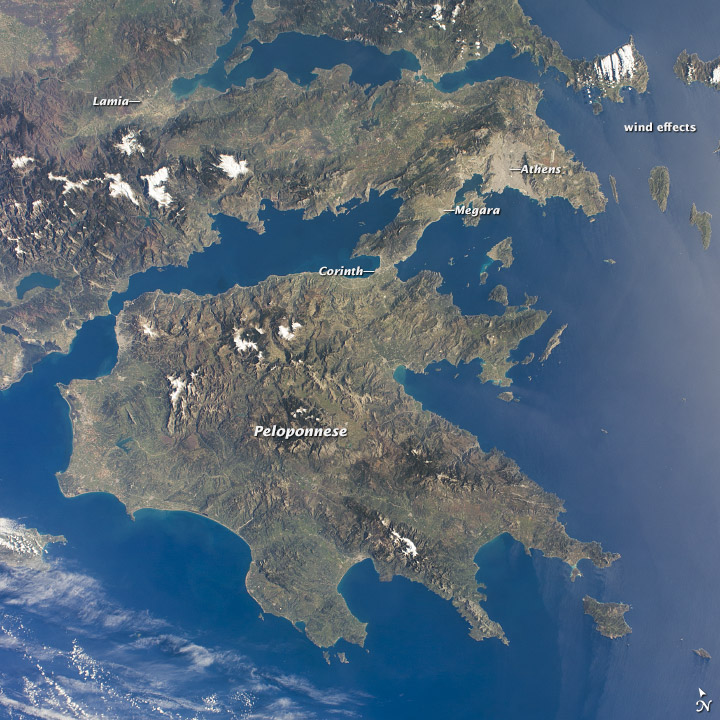
The Peloponnese from ISS, 2014

- Arcadia – 100,611 inhabitants
- Argolis – 108,636 inhabitants
- Corinthia – 144,527 inhabitants
- Laconia – 100,871 inhabitants
- Messenia – 180,264 inhabitants
- Achaea – 331,316 inhabitants
- Elis – 198,763 inhabitants
- Islands (only the municipality Troizinia and part of Poros)

== Cities ==
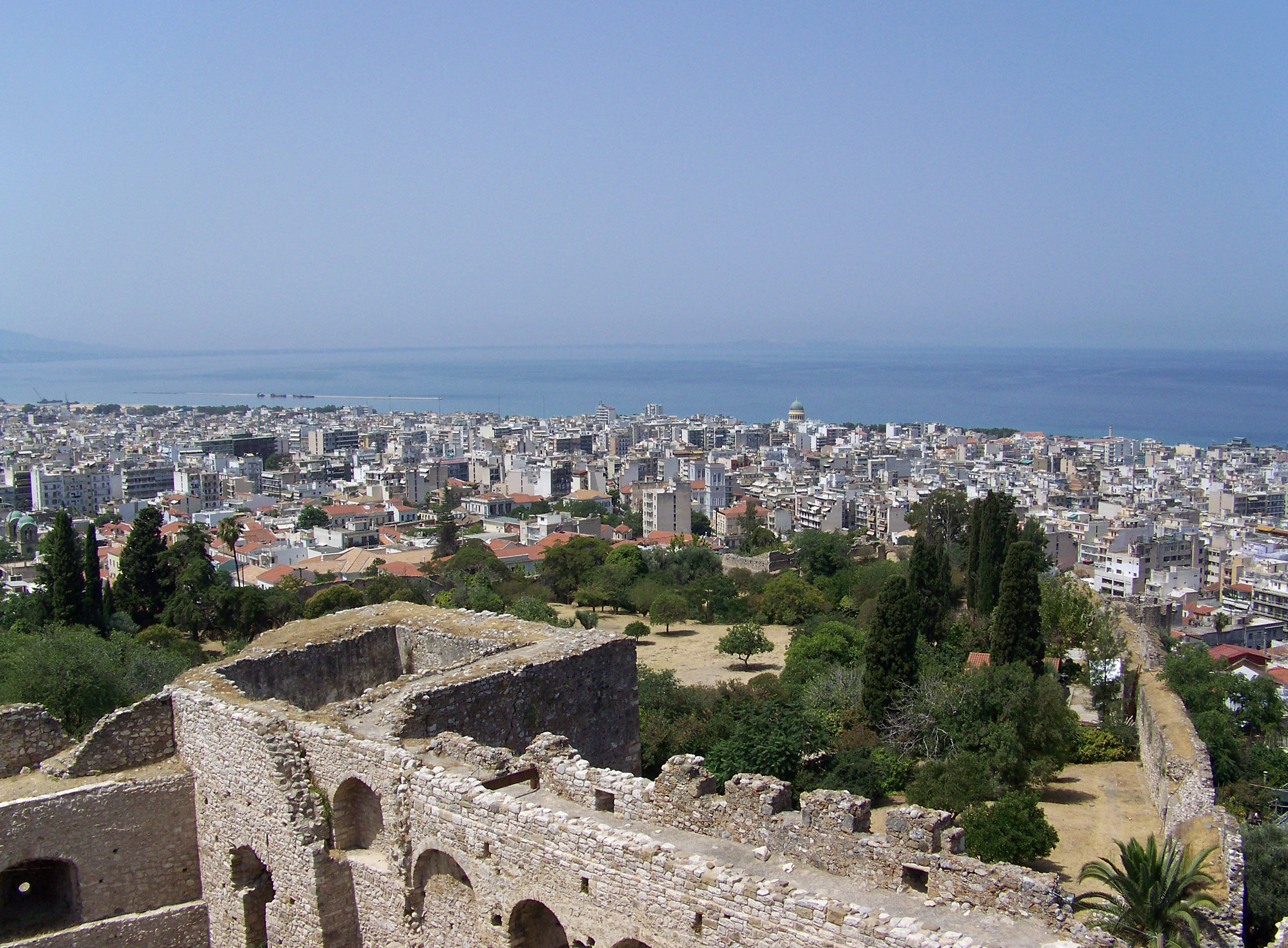
View of Patras from the Patras Castle

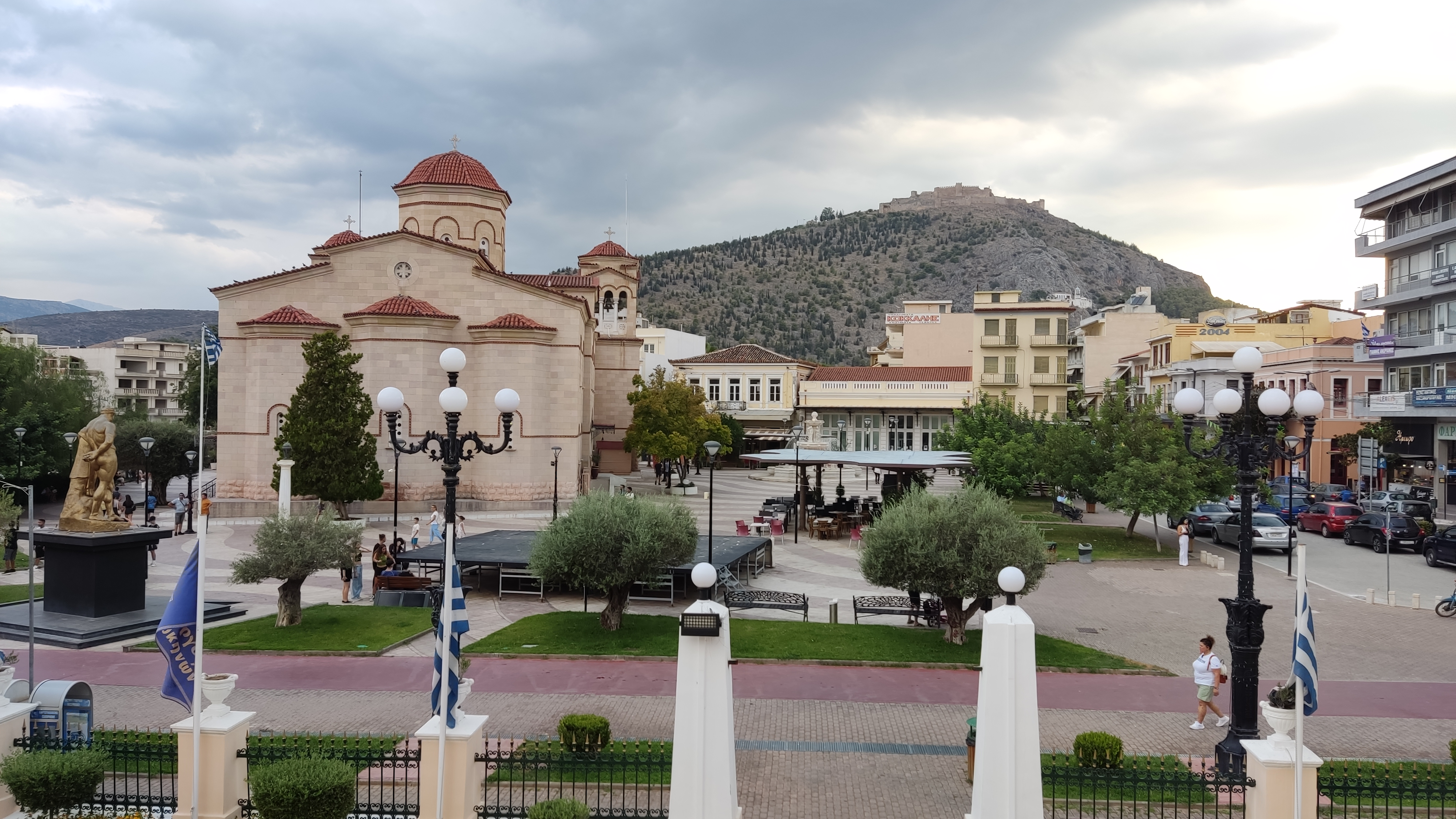
Saint Peter's Square is the central square of Argos.

The principal modern cities of the Peloponnese are (2011 census):

- Patras – 170,896 inhabitants
- Kalamata – 62,409 inhabitants
- Corinth – 38,132 inhabitants
- Tripoli – 30,912 inhabitants
- Aigio – 26,523 inhabitants
- Pyrgos – 25,180 inhabitants
- Argos – 24,700 inhabitants
- Sparta – 19,854 inhabitants
- Nafplio – 18,910 inhabitants
- Amaliada - 18,303 inhabitants

== Archaeological sites ==
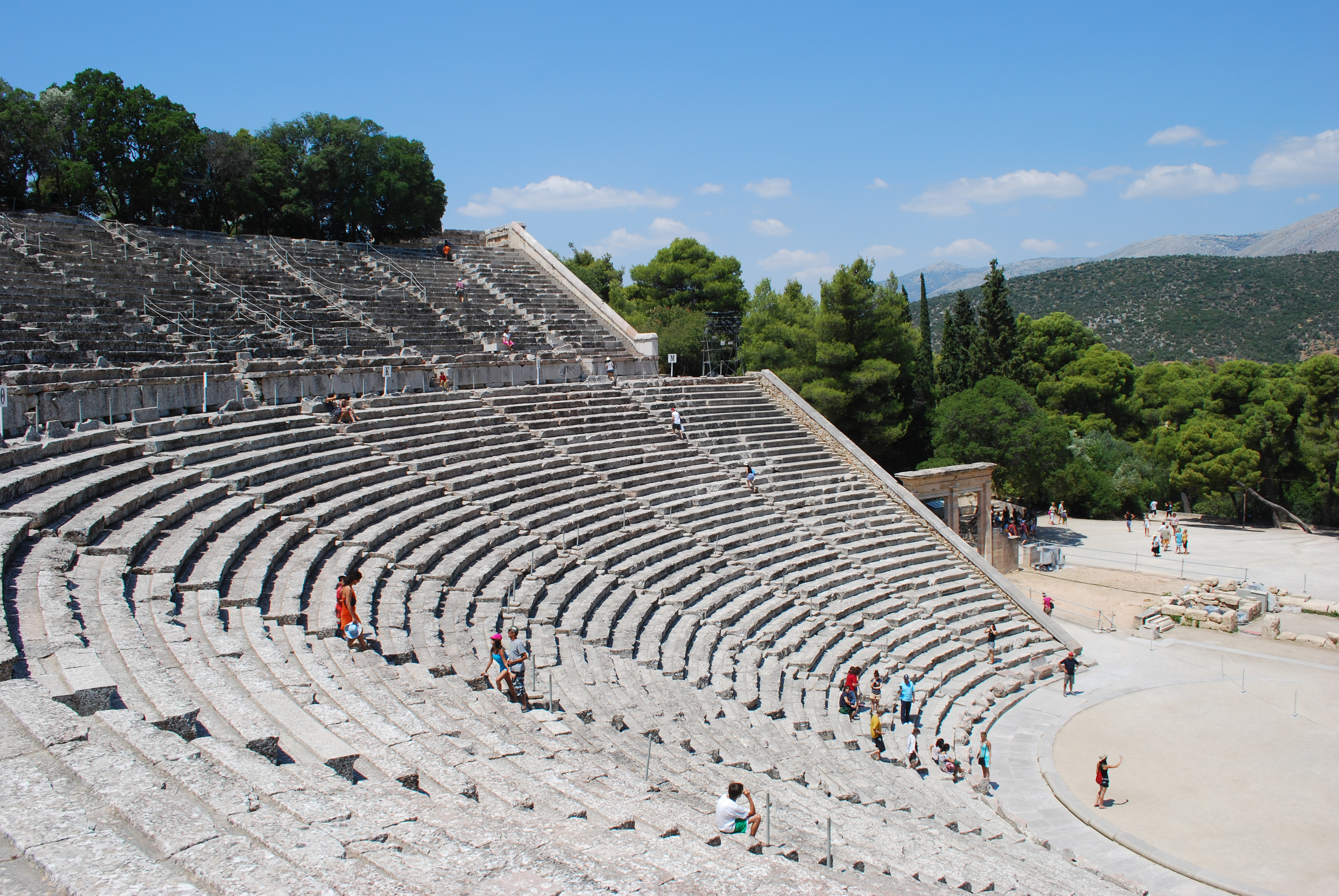
The ancient theatre of Epidaurus

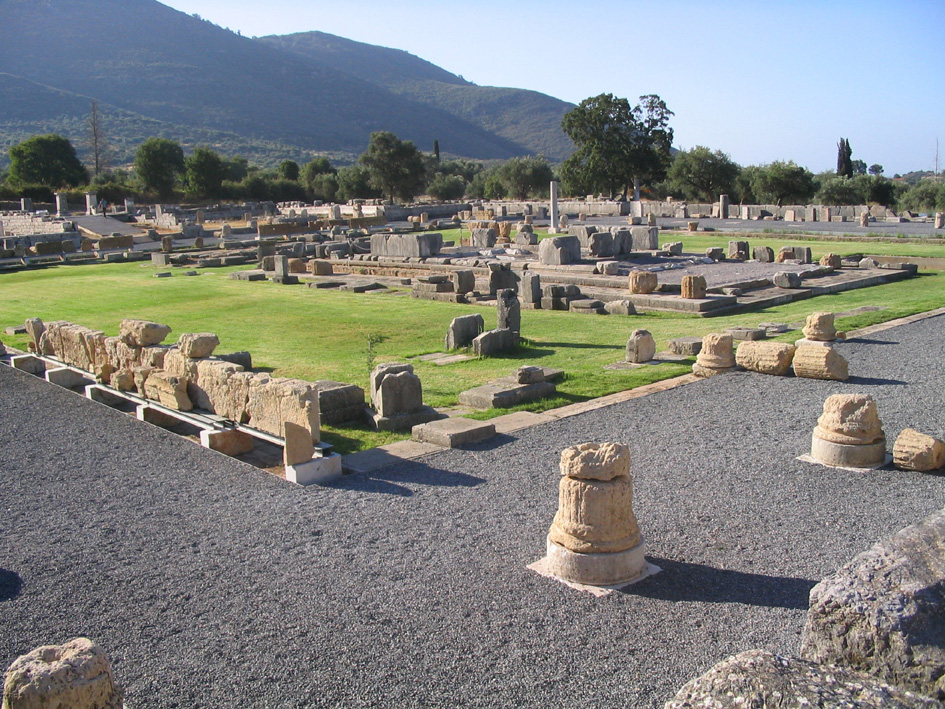
View of the ancient Asclepeion in Messene

The Peloponnese possesses many important archaeological sites dating from the Bronze Age through to the Middle Ages. Among the most notable are:

- Bassae‡ (ancient town and the temple of Epikourios Apollo and Greece's first UNESCO World Heritage Site)
- Corinth (ancient city)
- Diros caves (4000 – 3000 BC)
- Epidaurus‡ (ancient religious and healing centre)
- Koroni (medieval seaside fortress and city walls)
- Kalamata Acropolis (medieval acropolis and fortress located within the modern city)
- Messene (ancient city)
- Methoni (medieval seaside fortress and city walls)
- Mystras‡ (medieval Byzantine fortress-town near Sparta)
- Monemvasia (medieval Byzantine fortress-town)
- Mycenae‡ (fortress-town of the eponymous civilization)
- Olympia‡ (site of the Ancient Olympic Games)
- Pylos (the Palace of Nestor and a well-preserved medieval/early modern fortress)
- Pavlopetri (the oldest underwater city in the world, located in Vatika Bay, dating from the early Bronze Age 3500 BC)
- Sparta
- Tegea (ancient religious centre)
- Tiryns‡ (ancient fortified settlement)

‡ UNESCO World Heritage Site

== Cuisine ==
Specialities of the region:

- Gogges (or Gogglies or Stripta makaronia), pasta
- Giosa, lamb or goat meat
- Gournopoula (or Bouziopoula), pork
- Hilopites
- Kalamata olive
- Kolokythopita (pumpkin pie)
- Chortopita
- Piperopita
- Kagianas
- Trahanas
- Kokoras krasatos
- Katsikaki me patates, goat and potatoes
- Melitzanes Tsakonias, Tsakonian eggplant
- Syglino (pork meat) (Mani Peninsula)
- Regali (lamb soup) (Mani)
- Diples (dessert)
- Galatopita (dessert)
- Tentura drink (Patras area)

Several notable Peloponnese wines have Protected Designation of Origin (PDO) status. The Mantineia region makes a white wine made from Moschofilero, the Nemea wine region makes renowned red wines from the Agiorgitiko grape, and fortified red wine is made in the region around the city of Patras from Mavrodafni grapes.

== See also ==
- Geography of Greece
- List of Greek place names
