= Melingoi =

Slavic tribe in medieval Greece

Map of the Peloponnese during the Middle Ages.

The Melingoi or Milingoi (Greek: Μηλιγγοί) were a Slavic tribe that settled in the Peloponnese in southern Greece during the Middle Ages. In the early decades of the 7th century, Slavic tribes (Sclaveni) settled throughout the Balkans following the collapse of the Byzantine Empire's defense of the Danube frontier with some groups reaching as far south as the Peloponnese. The Sclaveni often settled in small groups (i.e., families and clans) and their demographic impact in mainland Greece was both weak and diffuse. Of these, two groups are known by name from later sources, the Melingoi and the Ezeritai, of whom the Melingoi settled on the western slopes of Mount Taygetos. The origin and etymology of the name Melingoi is unknown.

== Etymology ==
Their name probably derives from Slavic adjective "*milъ" (sweet). Slavic form of their name possibly sounded like "*Milenьki > *Milenьci", and some scholars related it to the early Slavic tribe of Milceni.

== History ==
Like the Ezeritai, the Melingoi are first mentioned in the De administrando imperio, a manual on statecraft written by the Byzantine emperor Constantine VII Porphyrogennetos (r. 913–959). The emperor records that in his time they paid a tribute of 60 gold nomismata, but that after they had revolted and been defeated, in the reign of Romanos I Lekapenos (r. 920–945), by the strategos Krinites Arotras, they had to pay 600 nomismata. Under Byzantine rule, the Melingoi retained an autonomous existence, but adopted Christianity and became Hellenized in language and culture.

During the period of Frankish rule in the 13th–14th centuries, they were employed by both the Frankish lords of the Principality of Achaea and by the Byzantine Greeks of the Despotate of the Morea as soldiers. For instance, according to the Chronicle of the Morea, Prince William II of Villehardouin (r. 1246–1278) awarded to the "great droungos of the Melingoi" exemption from all duties except military service. The Melingoi are still attested during the 1330s in a number of founder's inscriptions attached to churches in Laconia. One of them, Constantine Spanes, from the notable Spanes family, is called "tzaousios of the droungos of the Melingoi", implying its continued existence as a separate community. N. Nicoloudis identifies the late medieval thema of Kinsterna or Giserna (from Latin: cisterna, "cistern") with the area of the Melingoi in the northwestern Mani peninsula. While the elite of the Melingoi was rich and exposed to Byzantine and Frankish influence, the ordinary pastoralist hillman remained more conservative and secluded. Their Slavic language was still spoken as late as the 15th century, when the traveller Laskaris Kananos claimed that their tongue resembled that of the Wends. Many Slavic placenames have been preserved to this day.

== Notes ==
a: Droungos was originally a Late Roman/Byzantine term for a battalion-sized military unit, but from the 12th century on had been equated with zygos ("mountain range") and applied to various mountainous areas in continental Greece, as well as the militia forces detailed to guard the passes in them (cf. the older term kleisoura).
