= Ezeritai =

Slavic tribe in medieval Greece

Map of the Peloponnese during the Middle Ages.

The Ezeritai (Greek: Ἐζερῖται) were a Slavic tribe that settled in the Peloponnese in southern Greece during the Middle Ages. In the early decades of the 7th century, Slavic tribes (Sclaveni) settled throughout the Balkans following the collapse of the Byzantine Empire's defense of the Danube frontier with some groups reaching as far south as the Peloponnese. The Sclaveni often settled in small groups (i.e., families and clans) and their demographic impact in mainland Greece was both weak and diffuse. Of these, two groups are known by name from later sources, the Ezeritai and the Melingoi, both having settled on the slopes of Mount Taygetos.

== Etymology ==
The Ezeritai apparently settled in the area known as Helos (Greek for "swamp"), from which their name derives (South Slavic ezero meaning "lake").

== History ==
The Ezeritai are mentioned in the De administrando imperio of Byzantine emperor Constantine VII Porphyrogennetos (r. 945–959), who records that they paid a tribute of 300 gold nomismata. The emperor further records that they had rebelled, along with the Melingoi, during the reign of Romanos I Lekapenos (r. 920–945), but were defeated by the strategos Krinites Arotras and forced to pay double tribute as a consequence. They are not mentioned thereafter, except for a reference to a bishopric of Ezera in the area, dating to 1340.
