= East Slavs =

Subgroup of Slavic peoples

Усходнія славяне (Belarusian) Восточные славяне (Russian) Выходнї славяне (Rusyn) Східні слов'яни (Ukrainian)
- Countries with predominantly East Slavic population (Belarus, Russia, Ukraine)

Total population
- 210 million+

Regions with significant populations
- Majority: Russia, Belarus, Ukraine; Minority: Baltics, Central Asia, Caucasus and other

Languages
- East Slavic languages: Belarusian, Russian, Rusyn, Ukrainian

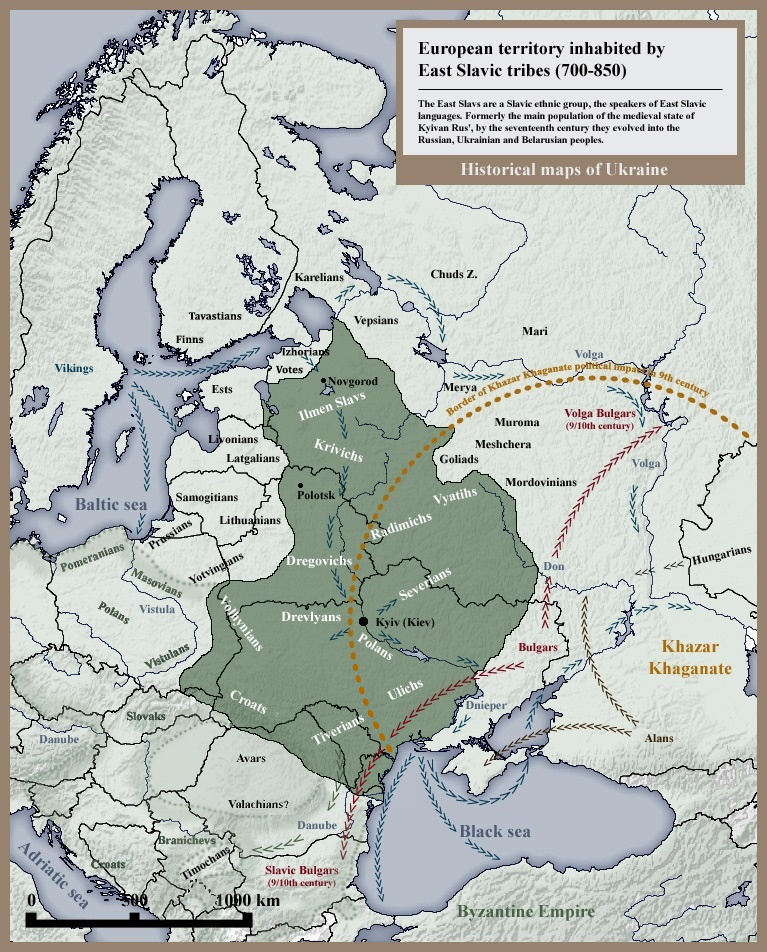
Maximum extent of European territory inhabited by the East Slavic tribes—predecessors of Kievan Rus', the first East Slavic state—in the 8th and 9th centuries

The East Slavs are a subgroup of the Slavs, who speak East Slavic languages and reside chiefly in Eastern Europe but extend also across northern Asia and the Pacific Ocean. They formed the majority of the population of the medieval state Kievan Rus', which they consider their cultural ancestor. Belarusians, Russians and Ukrainians are the existing East Slavic groups. Rusyns are sometimes considered a separate nation, though they are often considered a subgroup of Ukrainians. Don Cossacks are likewise sometimes considered a separate nation, though they are often considered a subgroup of Russians.

== History ==
=== Sources ===
Researchers know relatively little about the Eastern Slavs prior to approximately 859 AD when the first events recorded in the Primary Chronicle occurred. The Eastern Slavs of these early times apparently lacked a written language. The few known facts come from archaeological digs, foreign travellers' accounts of the Rus' land, and linguistic comparative analyses of Slavic languages.

Very few native Rus' documents dating before the 11th century (none before the 10th century) have survived. The earliest major manuscript with information on Rus' history, the Primary Chronicle, dates from the late 11th and early 12th centuries. It lists twelve Slavic tribal unions which, by the 10th century, had settled in the later territory of the Kievan Rus between the Western Bug, the Dniepr and the Black Sea: the Polans, Drevlyans, Dregovichs, Radimichs, Vyatichs, Krivichs, Slovens, Dulebes (later known as Volhynians and Buzhans), White Croats, Severians, Ulichs, and Tivertsi.

=== Migration ===
There is no consensus among scholars as to the urheimat of the Slavs. In the first millennium AD, Slavic settlers are likely to have been in contact with other ethnic groups who moved across the Eastern European Plain during the Migration Period. Between the first and ninth centuries, the Sarmatians, Huns, Alans, Avars, Bulgars, and Magyars passed through the Pontic steppe in their westward migrations. Although some of them could have subjugated the region's Slavs, these foreign tribes left little trace in the Slavic lands. The Early Middle Ages also saw Slavic expansion as an agriculturist and beekeeper, hunter, fisher, herder, and trapper people. By the 8th century, the Slavs were the dominant ethnic group on the East European Plain.

By 600 AD, the Slavs had split linguistically into southern, western, and eastern branches. The East Slavs practiced "slash-and-burn" agricultural methods which took advantage of the extensive forests in which they settled. This method of agriculture involved clearing tracts of forest with fire, cultivating it and then moving on after a few years. Slash and burn agriculture requires frequent movement because soil cultivated in this manner only yields good harvests for a few years before exhausting itself, and the reliance on slash and burn agriculture by the East Slavs explains their rapid spread through eastern Europe. The East Slavs flooded Eastern Europe in two streams. One group of tribes settled along the Dnieper river in what is now Ukraine and Belarus to the North; they then spread northward to the northern Volga valley, east of modern-day Moscow and westward to the basins of the northern Dniester and the Southern Buh rivers in present-day Ukraine and southern Ukraine.

Another group of East Slavs moved to the northeast, where they encountered the Varangians of the Rus' Khaganate and established an important regional centre of Novgorod for protection. The same Slavic population also settled the present-day Tver Oblast and the region of Beloozero. Having reached the lands of the Merya near Rostov, they linked up with the Dnieper group of Slavic migrants.

=== Pre-Kievan period ===
According to archeology, the Prague, Korchak, Penkova, Kolochin, and Kyiv cultures are classified as early Slavic. The earliest of which, Kyiv, from the 2nd–3rd centuries AD. e. was the northern neighbor of the more developed and multi-ethnic Chernyakhov culture, associated with another early group of slavs(Veneti/Venedi/Venedae?). Rare, few and short-lived settlements of the Slavs were located "in unusual topographic conditions: in low places, often now flooded during floods".

Eastern Slavs, who found themselves as a result of migrations of the 4th–5th centuries. in the basins of lakes Chudskoye and Ilmen, formed the culture of Pskov long barrows. This culture was strongly influenced by the autochthonous Finno-Ugric and Baltic peoples, from whom it adopted a specific burial rite and some features of ceramics, but in general, the way of life of the Eastern Slavs changed little. By the 5th century on the site of the Kyiv culture and in other regions to the north, east, west and south of it, a number of related cultures arise, such as Korchak, Kolochin, etc. Among the East Slavs, fortified cities appeared in northern Ukraine and in southern Belarus and southwest Russia; the Ilmen Slovenes and the Krivichs did not reach Lake Ladoga and the northern reaches of the Baltic Sea until the 7th century AD. (based on archaeological data in the town on Mayat river). The first settlements near the Polans and Severians arose in the region of Kyiv and Chernigov already by the 7th–8th centuries, which indicates at least a partial rejection of the previous strategy of scattered and secretive living among the forests. This is also evidenced by the fact that in the VIII-IX centuries. in all other East Slavic lands there were no more than two dozen cities, while only on the Left Bank of the Dnieper there were about a hundred of them. The foundation of the main Slavic city of this region, Novgorod, is attributed by the letopis to 862. In the same era, settlements appeared on the territories of other East Slavic tribes (see Old Russian cities). So, the northerners who lived on the territory of modern Voronezh, Belgorod and Kursk regions, along with settlements in the 9th–10th centuries. built fortified settlements, mainly at the confluence of large rivers (see Romensko-Borshchiv culture). In the 10th century, a fortress appeared not far from the city of Smolensk that arose later (the Gnezdovsky archaeological complex).

Somewhat apart are the early East Slavic settlements, the creation of which is attributed to the tribal unions of Dulebs and Antes. Archaeologically, they are represented by the Prague-Korchak and Penkov cultures, respectively. A number of such settlements of the Prague-Korchak (Zimino, Lezhnitsa, Khotomel, Babka, Khilchitsy, Tusheml) and Penkovo (Selishte, Pastyrskoe) cultures existed in the 6th–7th centuries. on a vast territory from the borders of modern Poland and Romania to the Dnieper. The Prague-Korchak settlements were a site surrounded by a wooden wall with one building, which was part of the common wall of the settlement. They did not have agricultural tools, and the settlements, apparently, were built to collect and accommodate a military detachment. Penkovsky settlements could have up to two dozen buildings inside the walls and were large trade, craft and administrative centers for their time. The center of the territory controlled by the dulebs (Zimino, Lezhnitsa) was in the basin of the Western Bug; the geographical center of the Penkovo culture falls on the Dnieper region, but the main fortress of the Antes (Selishte) was located in the western part of this area, near the borders of Byzantine Empire (in modern Moldova), on which they made military campaigns. The early Slavic settlements were destroyed by the Avars in the 7th century, after which they were not built until the 10th century.

=== Post-Kievan period ===
The disintegration, or parcelling of the polity of Kievan Rus' in the 11th century resulted in considerable population shifts and a political, social, and economic regrouping. The resultant effect of these forces coalescing was the marked emergence of new peoples. While these processes began long before the fall of Kiev, its fall expedited these gradual developments into a significant linguistic and ethnic differentiation among the Rus' people into Ukrainians, Belarusians, and Russians. All of this was emphasized by the subsequent polities these groups migrated into: southwestern and western Rus', where the Ruthenian and later Ukrainian and Belarusian identities developed, was subject to Lithuanian and later Polish influence; whereas the Russian ethnic identity developed in the Muscovite northeast and the Novgorodian north.

=== Modern East Slavs ===
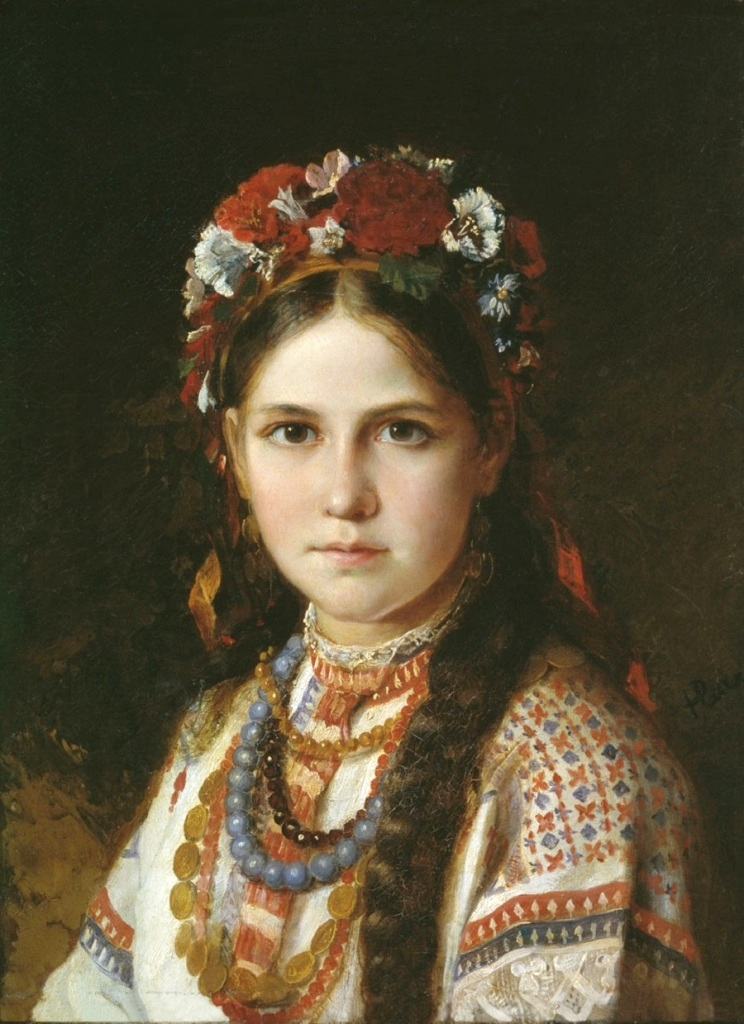
A young Ukrainian girl in a folk costume, by Nikolay Rachkov

Modern East Slavic peoples and ethnic/subethnic groups include:

- Belarusians
  - Litvins
- Cossacks
  - Zaporozhian Cossacks
    - Tavria Zaporozhians
    - Black Sea Zaporozhians
- Podlashuks
- Poleshuks
- Russians
  - Albazinians
  - Doukhobors
  - Goryuns
  - Kamchadals
  - Kamenschiks
  - Lipovans
  - Polekhs
  - Pomors
  - Semeiskie
  - Siberians
  - Starozhily
- Rusyns
  - Boyko
  - Hutsuls
  - Lemkos
  - Pannonian Rusyns
- Ukrainians
  - Cossacks
  - Galicians
  - Podolyans
  - Slobozhanians
  - Zaporozhian Cossacks

== Genetics ==
According to Y chromosome, mDNA and autosomal marker CCR5de132, East Slavs and West Slavs are genetically very similar, which is consistent with the proximity of their languages, demonstrating significant differences from the neighboring Finno-Ugric, Turkic and North Caucasian peoples all the way from west to east; such genetic homogeneity is somewhat unusual for genetics given such a wide dispersal of Slavic populations, especially Russians.

Together, they form the basis of the "East European" gene cluster, which also includes Balts, some Balkan peoples. Genetic research has shown that the genomes of East Slavs are homogenous and contrary to popular belief, unaffected by Turkic or Mongol influences.

Only the Northern Russians among the East and West Slavs belong to a different, "Northern European" genetic cluster, along with the Balts, Germanic and Baltic Finnic peoples (Northern Russian populations are very similar to the Balts).

== See also ==
- List of ancient Slavic peoples
- List of Slavic studies journals
- List of tribes and states in Belarus, Russia and Ukraine
- South Slavs
- West Slavs
