= Sukow-Dziedzice group =

Archaeological culture

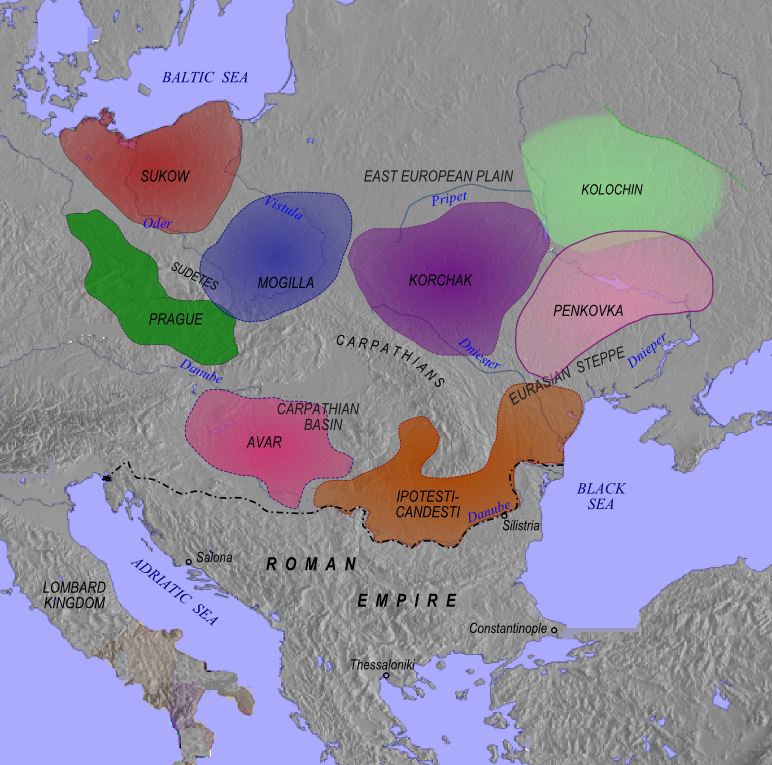
Sukow-Dziedzice archaeological culture north of Prague, Mogilla and Korchak cultures.

The Sukow or Sukow-Dziedzice group (German: Sukow-Dziedzice-Gruppe) or Sukow-Dziedzice culture (Polish: Kultura Sukow-Dziedzice), also known as Szeligi culture, was an archaeological culture attributed to the Early Slavs. Areal of sites lays between Elbe and Vistula rivers in Northeast Germany and North West Poland. The earliest sites usually date to the second half of 7th and mid-8th centuries.

There exist different views on its origin. It has features of both Przeworsk culture and Prague-Korchak culture. In comparison to Carpathian Slavic-speaking population of Korchak-Mogilany-type some consider Sukow-Dziedzice's had different population, maybe indigenous to Poland or arrived from within Poland and Belarus or a mixture of Korchak Slavs and indigenous post-Przeworsk population. Slavic archaeologists including M. Kazanski identified the 6th-century Prague-Korchak culture and later Sukow-Dziedzice group as Sclaveni archaeological cultures, and the Penkovka culture (Prague-Penkovka) with Antes.

== Dating ==
Most recent studies, based on dendrochronological evidence, conclude there is little evidence of a Slavic presence in Eastern Germany and Northwestern Poland before the end of the 7th or the early 8th century, and there was only sparse settlement till the 9th century. The oldest dendrochronological date of Sukow settlement is dated to 591 CE, while oldest radiocarbon dating of finds to 599 CE (Bosau-Bischofswarder), but according to the same data almost all early Slavic sites cannot be dated before 700 CE. Also, "palynological observations indicate a fast and drastic reduction in settlement during the sixth and seventh centuries, as it is shown by a minimum of cerealia and an increasing proportion of trees; nevertheless a total lack of settlement can not be deduced".

== Later stages ==
The old theory mainly represented by Joachim Herrmann, who argued 7th century second wave immigration origin of later archaeological groups which replaced Sukow, is rejected by now. In that period only arrived first Slavic people of Sukow culture who didn't build yet strongholds.

- Feldberg-type, also known as Feldberg-Kędrzyny or Feldberger-Gołańcz-Kędrzyny in Poland, appeared mainly in Pomerania and Mecklenburg, but also Little Poland and Southern Silesia, from mid-8th to late 9th century but in some parts was preserved until 9-10th century. Based on data collected, L. R. Lozny in 2013 considered that a minor percentage already appeared in the end of 7th and early 8th century.
- Menkendorf-type, also known as Menkendorf-Szczecin in Poland, followed Feldberg-type from late 8th or early 9th until the end of 10th century.

== See also ==
- Leipzig group
- Tornow group
- Korchak culture
- Penkovka culture
- Ipotesti-Candesti culture
- Kolochin culture

== Sources ==
- Barford, M. Paul (2001). The Early Slavs: Culture and Society in Early Medieval Eastern Europe. Cornell University Press. ISBN 9780801439773
- Biermann, Felix (2011). "Functions of the Large Feldberg Type Strongholds from the 8th/9th Century in Mecklenburg and Pomerania". Sprawozdania Archeologiczne (63), pp. 149–173
- Brather, Sebastian (2004). "The beginnings of Slavic settlement east of the river Elbe". Antiquity, Volume 78, Issue 300. pp. 314–329
- Brather, S. (2001; 2nd ed. 2008). Archäologie der westlichen Slawen: Siedlung, Wirtschaft und Gesellschaft im früh- und hochmittelalterlichen Ostmitteleuropa. Walter de Gruyter. ISBN 9783110206098
- Brather, S., Marek Dulinicz (2005). "Slawische Keramik. Elbslawen" in Germanische Altertumskunde Online. Volume 29. Walter de Gruyer, pp. 79–88. ISBN 3110183609
- Cvijanović, Irena (2013). "The Typology of Early Medieval Settlements in Bohemia, Poland and Russia". In Rudić, Srđan (ed.). The World of the Slavs: Studies of the East, West and South Slavs: Civitas, Oppidas, Villas and Archeological Evidence (7th to 11th Centuries AD). Istorijski institut. pp. 289–344. ISBN 978-86-7743-104-4.
- Dolukhanov, Pavel (2014). "The Slavs in Europe". The Early Slavs: Eastern Europe from the Initial Settlement to the Kievan Rus. Routledge. ISBN 978-1-317-89222-9.
- Heather, Peter (2009). "The Creation of Slavic Europe". Empires and Barbarians: The Fall of Rome and the Birth of Europe. Oxford University Press. pp. 412–414, 419, 426, 430–1, 434, 449. ISBN 978-0-19-975272-0.
- James, Edward (2014). Europe's Barbarians AD 200-600. Routledge. ISBN 978-1-317-86825-5.
- Kazanski, Michel (2020). "Archaeology of the Slavic Migrations". Encyclopedia of Slavic Languages and Linguistics Online (PDF). BRILL.
- Lozny, R. Ludomir (2013). Prestate Societies of the North Central European Plains: 600-900 CE. Springer. ISBN 9781461468158.
