= Volyntsevo culture =

Archaeological culture in eastern Europe

- Geographical range: Left-bank Ukraine
- Period: Early Middle Ages
- Dates: c. 700 – c. 850
- Preceded by: Kolochin culture Penkovka culture Prague-Korchak culture Imenkovo culture
- Followed by: Romny-Borshchevo culture

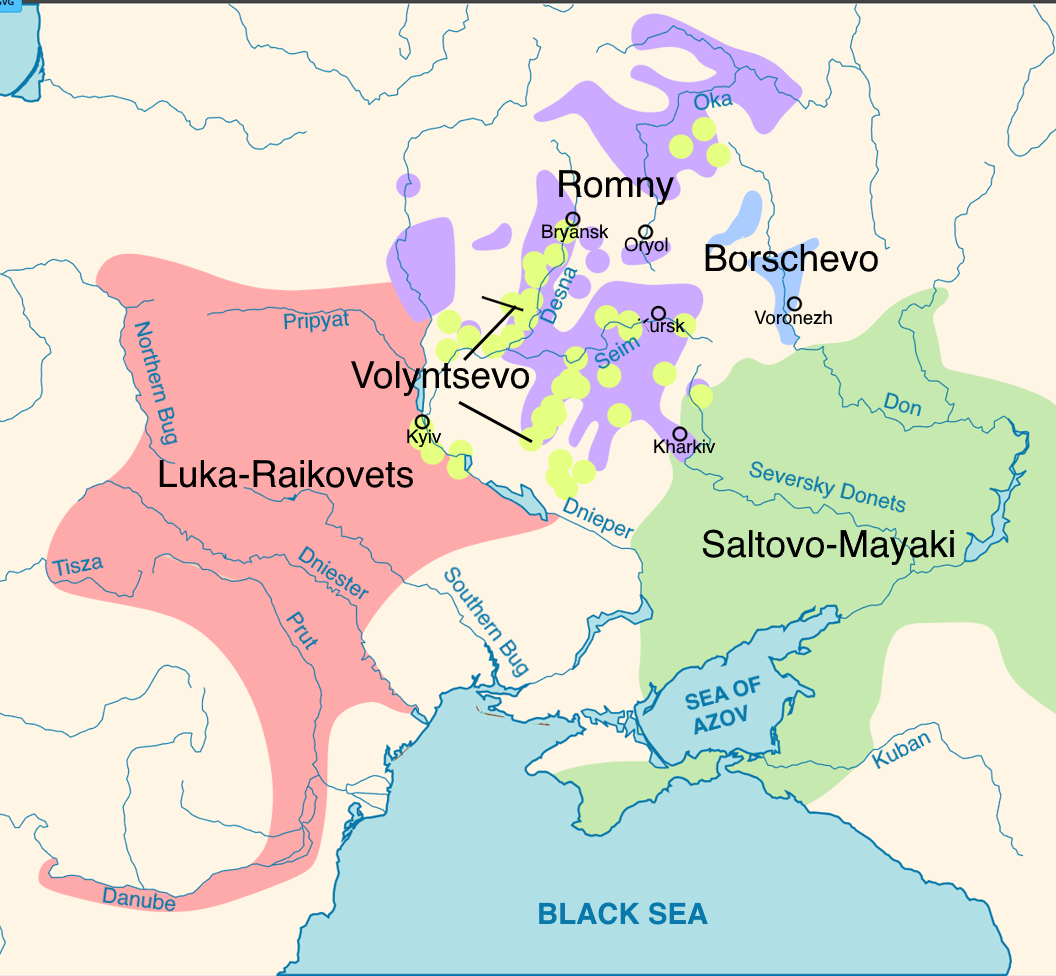
Archaeological cultures of Eastern Europe in the 9th century AD. The Volyntsevo culture is marked in yellow

Volyntsevo culture or Volyntseve culture is an archaeological culture of the early Middle Ages (8th to 9th centuries), located between the Dnieper and the Don rivers. In the west, the territory of the Volyntsevo monuments reaches the right bank of Dnieper in the Kyiv area. Dmytro Berezovets identified the culture, and named it after the village of Volyntseve in Sumy Oblast of Central Ukraine, which he excavated in 1948–1950.

== Monuments ==
The type site of Volyntsevo, itself, is an open settlement and cemetery situated in a valley and surrounded by bogs.

The best known archaeological monuments of Volyntsevo culture are: Bytytsia and Novotroitske settlements on the Psel River, the burial from Rylsk, Russia (Kursk Oblast), the settlement of Volyntseve, the Oleksandrivka settlement near Chernihiv, Obukhiv, and Khodosivka near Kyiv.

In Kyiv, layers of the Volyntsevo culture of the middle of the 8th to early 9th century were found on Starokyivsky Hill and under the northern gallery of the Church of the Tithes.

The culture is identified with the ancestors of the Severians and Radimichs. It replaces the Penkovka and Kolochin culture, and starting from the end of the 8th century, is replaced by the Romny culture.

== Origins ==
Some scholars argue that Volyntsevo culture was formed as a result of the advancement of the Slavic tribes belonging to the Prague-Korchak culture (carriers of antiquities of the Sakhnovka type) from the west to the left (eastern) bank of Dnieper (see Left-bank Ukraine, and Right-bank Ukraine). Due to the similarity of Volyntsevo antiquities with those of the Dnieper's right bank, sometimes they are referred to as "monuments of Sakhnovka – Volyntsevo type" or "Luka Raykovetskaya – Sakhnovka – Volyntsevo type". Volyntsevo also has influences of Kolochin culture and Penkovka culture, which replaced with the Sakhnivka culture.

Both the Luka Raykovetskaya type of antiquities, and the Sakhnovka type of antiquities are generally found on the right (western) bank of Dnieper, while the Volyntsevo type is generally found on the opposite bank. Their emergence and movement of Slavic people was caused by the arrival of the Bulgars and Khazars, and their political alliances with the Byzantine Empire, on the detriment of the Antes.

== Material culture ==
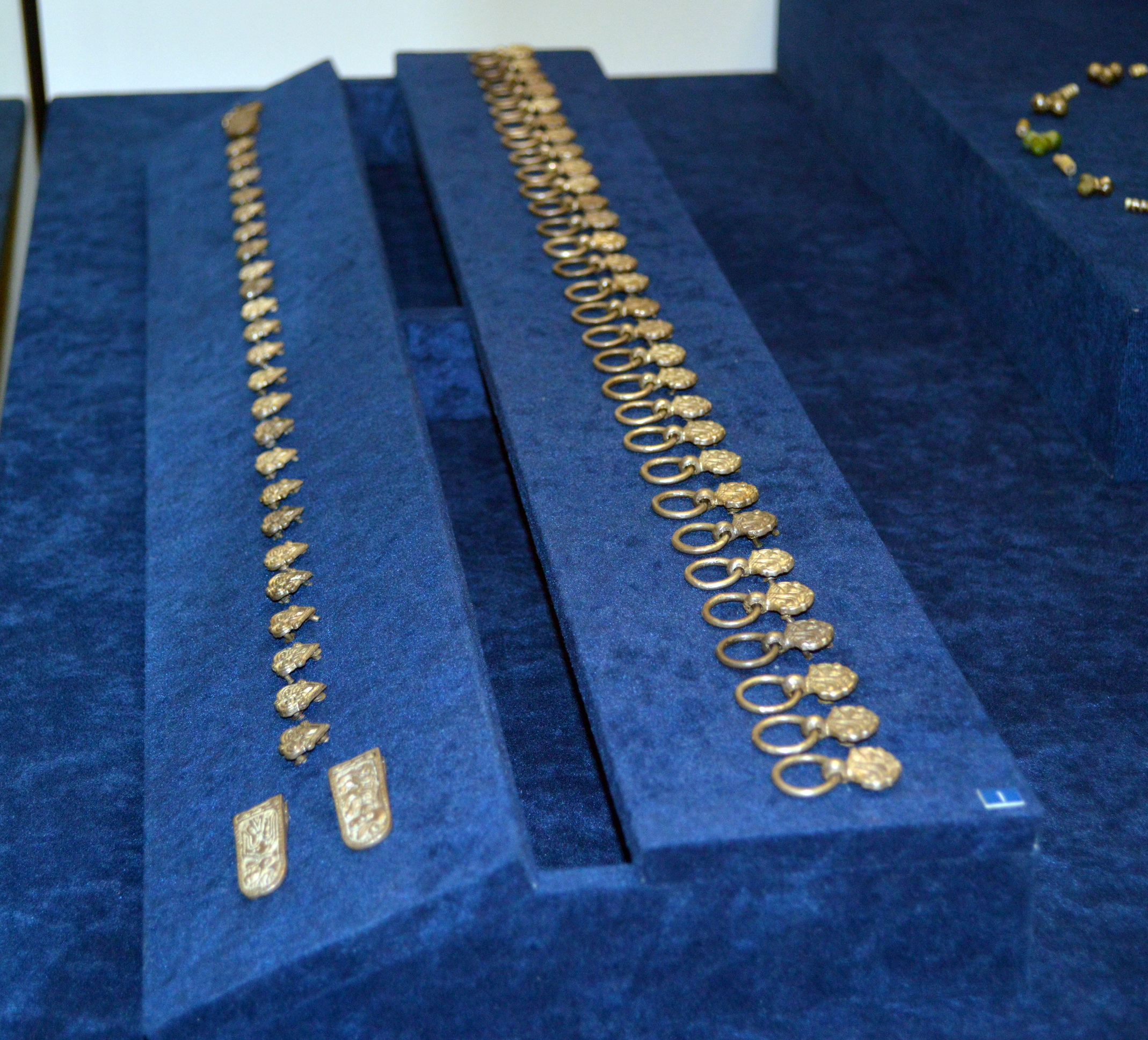
Belt decorations, silver, Saltovo-Mayaki culture

Volyntsevo populations built unfortified settlements and lived in semi-dugout type of houses equipped with mud-baked kilns. The dead were cremated, and the ashes were placed in an urn. The population grew millet, wheat, rye, and peas. They used plows to till the land.

Researchers have noted the presence of a significant amount of artifacts of the Saltovo-Mayaki culture, associated with the Khazar Khaganate. The main marker of Volyntsevo culture is the wheel-made black-glazed ceramics with a high straight upper rim.

A particular feature of the Volyntsevo culture is the amount of Islamic silver which is found, typically as coin hoards. The sites also often produce large amounts of silver jewellery, more than in other Slavic lands.

"The Volyntsevo culture has been related to the Slavic tributaries of the Khazar Qaghanate, described in the ancient Russian chronicle as Polyane, Severa, Vyatichi, and Radimichi."

== Last stages ==
In the first third of the 9th century, many Volyntsevo settlements, such as Khodosivka, Obukhiv, the Bytytsia, and the Volyntseve, suffered a period of destruction; signs of fires abound. The most vivid picture of destruction was noted at the Bytytsia site, and at the Andriiashivka settlement. These events can be dated quite accurately by the finds of Arabic dirhem silver coins from the Lower Syrovatka site; the youngest of them dated in 813 AD. Archaeologist A.V. Komar put forward a hypothesis that the destruction may have been connected with the invasion of the early Rus' people from the left bank of the Dnieper. This was based on the dating of arrowheads, and of the special type of ax found at the Bititskoe settlement, but this was disputed by other scholars.

On the other hand, A. Schavelev and A. A. Fetisov identify these artifacts as belonging to the cultures of the Volga steppes to the east, or to those of the Southern Ural mountains.

Slavic Romny culture developed in these areas subsequently. But the Romny-Borshevo ceramics spread over a much wider area, such as into the basins of the Upper Don and the Oka.

== Literature ==
- P M Barford (2001). The Early Slavs: Culture and Society in Early Medieval Eastern Europe. Cornell University Press. ISBN 9780801439773.
- Peter J. Heather, Empires and Barbarians: The Fall of Rome and the Birth of Europe. Oxford University Press, 2012.
- Kazanski, Michel (2013). "The Middle Dnieper area in the seventh century: An archaeological survey". Travaux et Mémoires. 17 (1): 769–864. ISBN 978-2-916716-45-9.
- Vladimir Koloda (1999), The iron metallurgy of the Dnepro-Don interriver territory in the second half of the 1-st millennium A.D. archaeology.kiev.ua
