= Luka-Raikovetska culture =

Culture of the Slavs in the early Middle Ages

- Geographical range: Eastern Europe
- Period: Early Middle Ages
- Dates: c. 700 – c. 950
- Preceded by: Prague-Korchak culture Penkovka culture
- Followed by: Kievan Rus'; Balkan-Danubian culture

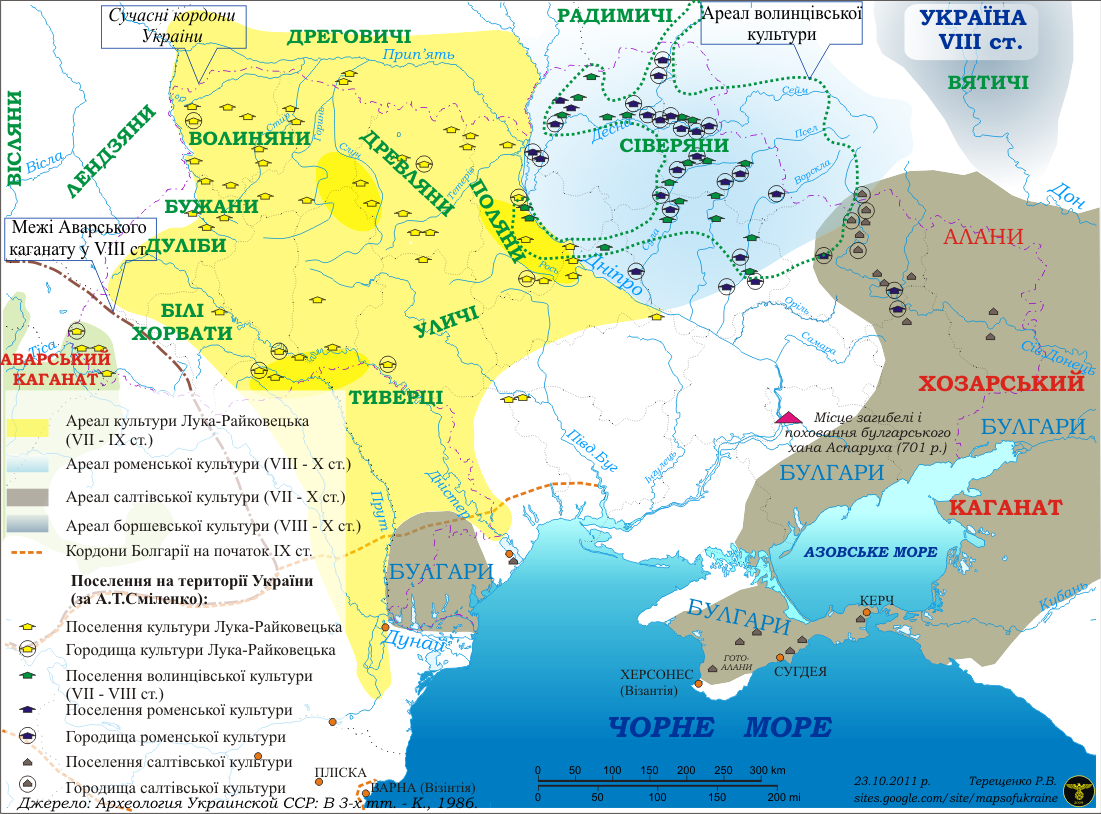
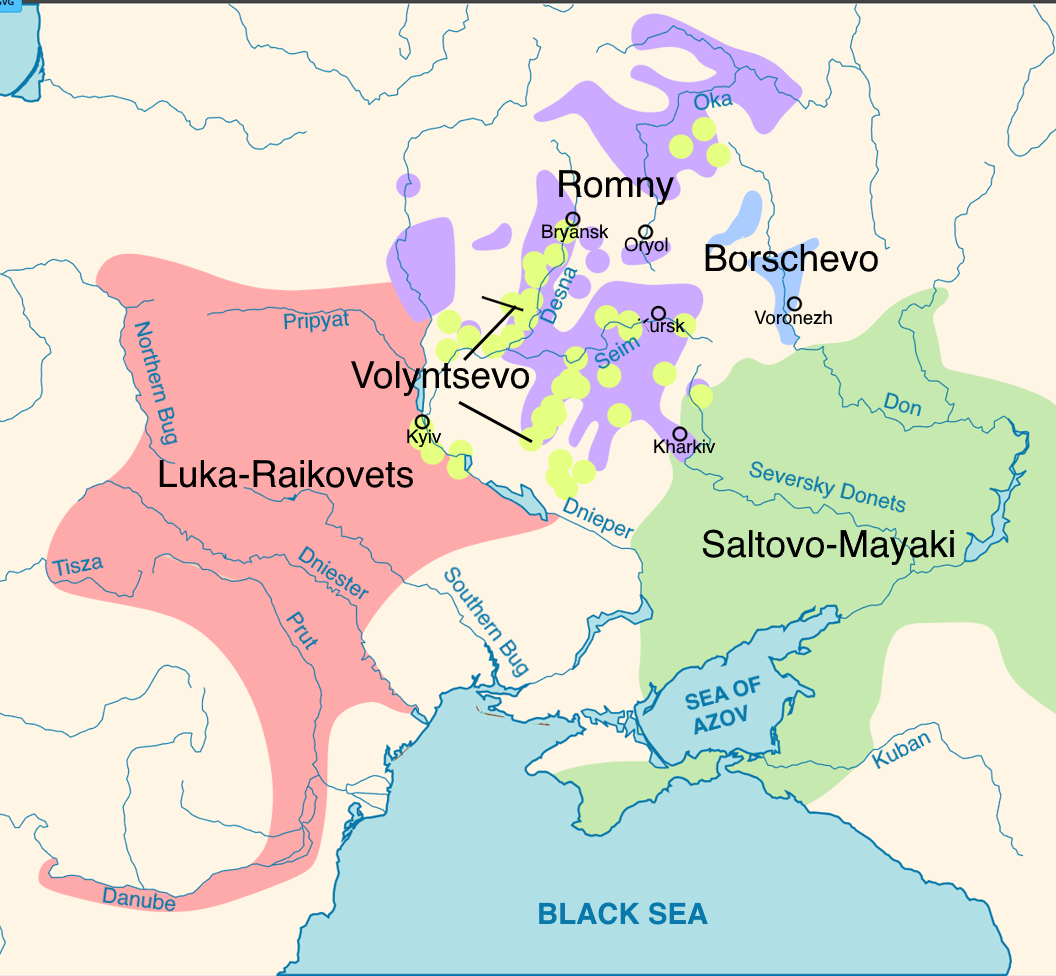
The range of Luka-Raikovetska culture marked in yellow (1) and red (2) in the 7th–10th century

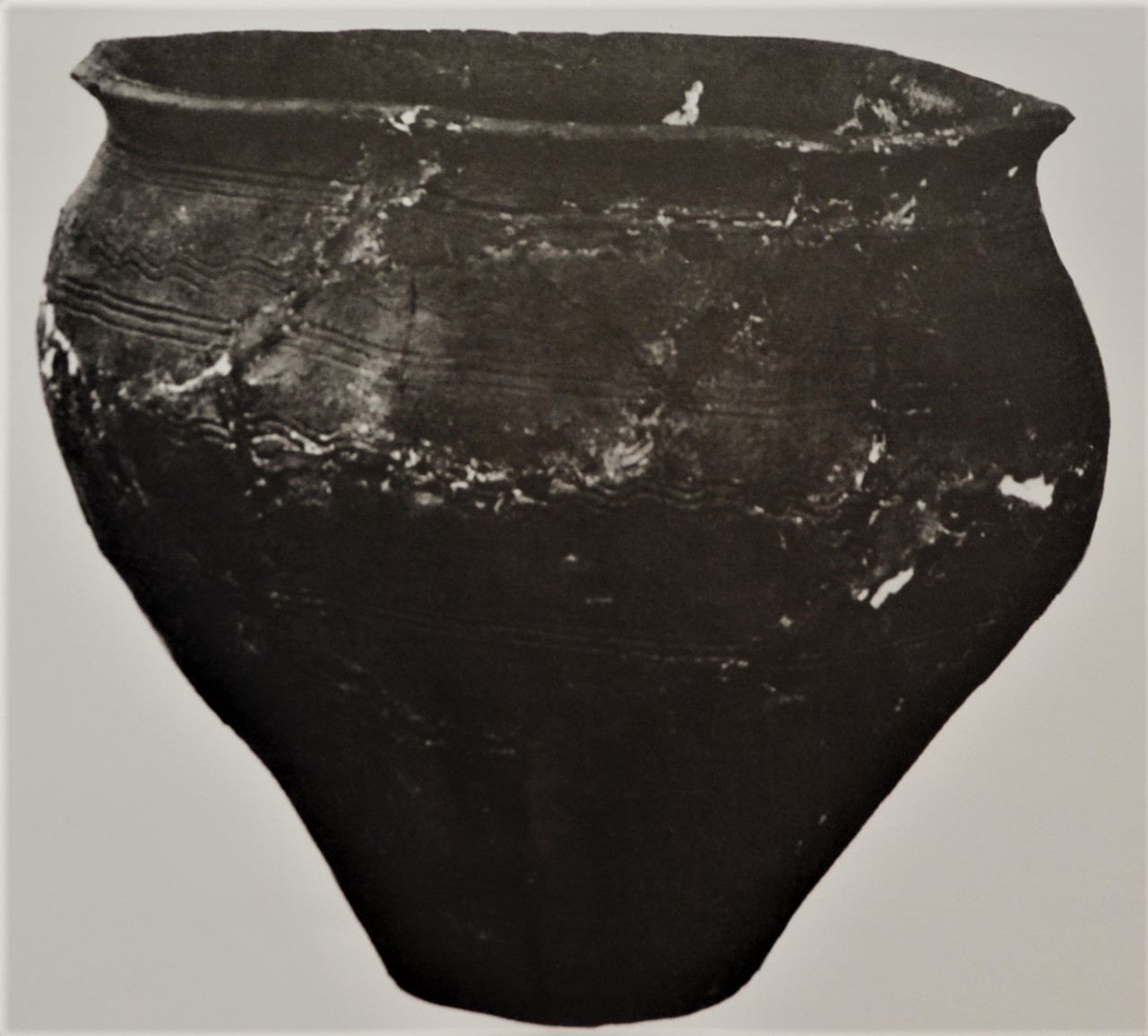
Example of a ceramic pot of the Luka-Raikovetska culture

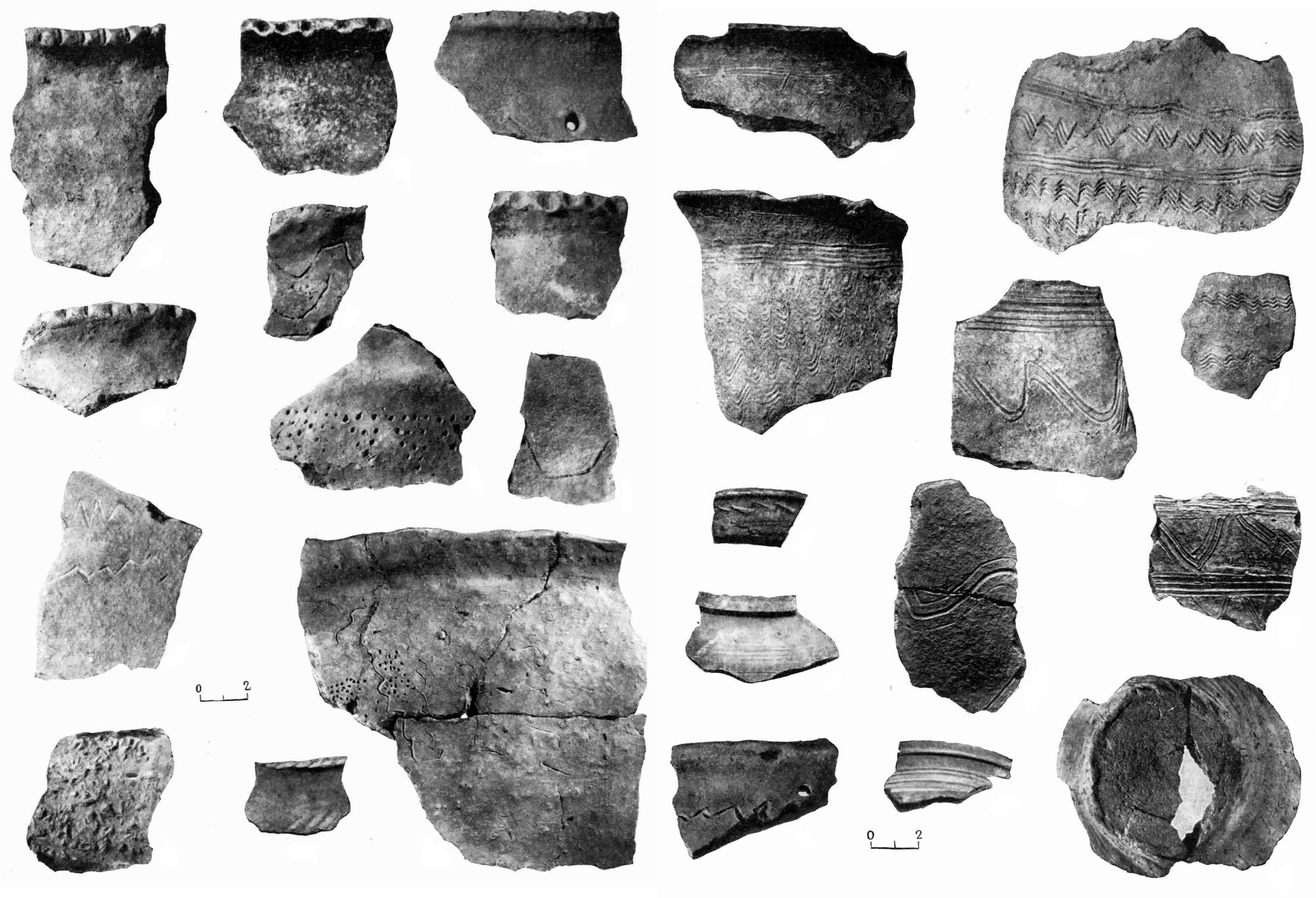
Luka-Raikovetska culture pottery

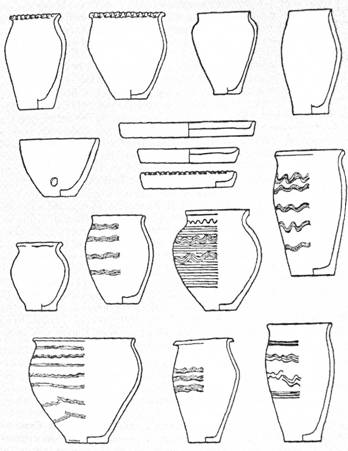
Luka-Raikovetska culture pottery

The Luka-Raikovetska culture (Ukrainian: Лука-райковецька культура); also rendered as Luka-Raikovets'ka, Luka-Raikovets, Luka-Raikovetskaya, Luka-Raykovetskaya or simply Raiky' or Raikovetska culture, is an early medieval archaeological culture of the Early Slavs in Eastern Europe. A derivation of the previous Prague-Korchak culture, the sites date from the end of the 7th century until the first half of the 10th century. The culture significantly influenced the tradition of the southern areas of the Kievan Rus'.

== Name ==
It is named after an archeological site discovered by V. K. Goncharov in 1946–1948 in the Luka tract near the village of Rayki/Raiky of Berdychiv Raion, Zhytomyr Oblast, in northwestern Ukraine.

== Geography ==
The basic territory of the culture included Western and Central Ukraine until the right-bank of Dnieper river. To the south it also expanded to the Upper Tisza (Zakarpattian part of Western Ukraine) and Lower Danube rivers, but sites in Romania and northern Bulgaria are sometimes grouped into a separate cultural group (as "Hlinca" culture in Moldova).

== Characteristics ==
The culture is a derivation of the previous Prague-Korchak culture west of the river Dnieper, and a Sakhnivka/Sakhanovka-type on the right-bank of Dnieper represents Luka-Raikovetska culture's early stage (second half of the 7th century to the first half of the 9th century) which "moved to the middle Dnieper area". However, the "Sakhnivka ceramic ware also shows traces of continuity with the Pen'kivka culture", and imitation of the imported Volyntsevo and Saltovo-Mayaki cultures. The culture is very similar to the Raciborz-Chodlik culture in Southern-Southeastern Poland (which division according to Paul M. Barford is a matter of debate).

The cultural phases are divided into "Early" with prevalent stucco ceramics (late 7-8th century), "Middle" or "Developed" with partially wheel-made pottery (earliest since 761, but usually 9th century), and "Late" with predominant wheel pottery (10th century). Generally, the ceramic is predominantly of conic pots with enlarged upper part and bent rim, also bowls and frying pans. The pottery has ornamental lines, bands, rims and holes.

The culture is characterized for large settlements in the Carpathian zone (Plisnesk, Roukhotine, Revne among others), and tribal-political centers (including Kyiv), which were administrative, economic and religious centers of the population. Since the 8th century can be observed increase in the number of strongholds.

The houses (semi-dugouts and above ground) make settlements which "were scattered in groups" making "settlement nests", which were non-fortified and fortified (wooden walls, earth ramparts, and ditches), and had inner stoves (predominantly of stone, and less adobe oven). There existed buildings for various purposes, including metallurgical workshops, and had an agricultural economy (using plowshares) that was based on spring and winter cereal, fallow farming, and livestock farming. The iron agricultural tools found at the site of Revne (of the tribe of Croats) shows "the highest level of development of agriculture ... close to the achievements of the Saltiv culture".

Cemeteries have cremation burials in pits and often barrows (tumulus i.e. burial mounds). The wooden constructions in the barrow cremation burials in the 8-10th century can be traced from the Dnieper to the Elbe river. In the late stages, probably due to Christian influences, can be observed emergence of inhumation.

== History ==
The culture is usually associated with southwestern part of East Slavic tribes, including the Polans, Ulichs, Drevlians, Volhynians, Buzhans, Dulebes, Croats, Tivertsi, and possibly Dregoviches in the north.

In the 7-8th century happened an eastward migration of its carriers almost to the left-bank of Dnieper, where came in contact with Volyntsevo culture (ancestors of the tribes of Severians and Radimichs), and Saltovo-Mayaki culture of the Bulgars and other steppe nomads, all of them causing the downfall and replacement of Ante's Pen'kivka culture.

The foreign product and numismatic findings "prove stable trade-economical ties of eastern Slavonic tribes of Raikovetska culture with neighboring territories population". The military and equestrian equipment also show Central European and Balkan-Danubian influences (of Carolingian, Pannonian Avars and Bulgars).

It is considered that the culture's tribal "unions-princedoms created preconditions for eastern Slavonic statehood springing up" and hence influenced formation of the Kievan Rus' state.
