= Martynivka Treasure =

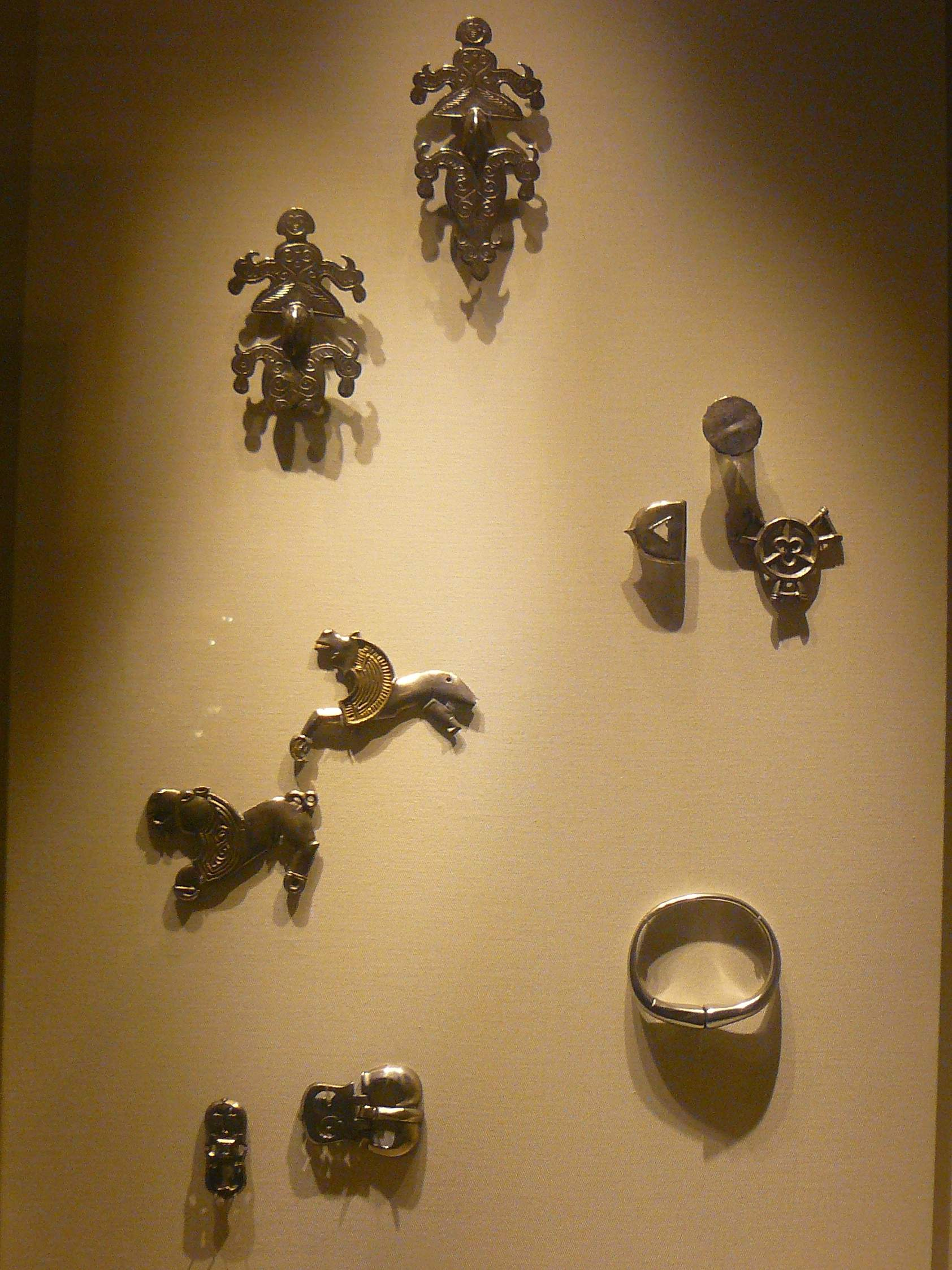
- Part of the Martynivka hoard on display in the British Museum
- Material: Silver and precious stones
- Created: 6th–7th centuries AD
- Period/culture: Slavs
- Present location: National Historical Museum of Ukraine and British Museum
- Identification: 1912,0610.1-22 (BM)

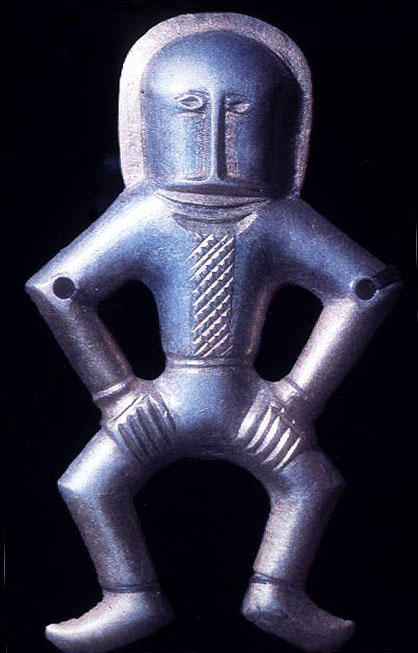
One of the figurines found at the Martynivka Treasure depicting a person wearing an embroidered shirt

Martynivka Treasure (Ukrainian: Мартинівський скарб, romanized: Martynivs'kyj skarb) is a hoard consisting of 116 silver items (weighing about 3.3 kg) found in 1909, in the village of Martynivka, Cherkasy Oblast, Ukraine. The treasure is currently preserved at the National Historical Museum of Ukraine in Kyiv and the British Museum in London. It is dated approximately to the 6th–7th centuries AD.

== Origin ==
Historians proposed different theories for the culture which this treasure could have belonged. The most popular hypothesis connects this hoard with Penkovka culture and Kolochin culture usually associated with the Antes.

== Description ==
The hoard includes four anthropomorphic silver figurines of 'dancing men' (Ukrainian newspapers sometimes refer to them as 'aliens' for their unusual appearance), five animal figurines, three fibulas, a radiate-head brooch, six armlets, tiaras, ear rings, neck rings, buckles, belt-fittings and horse harnesses. The style of figurines is sometimes considered as influenced by Huns, Bulgars or Avars.

== Literature ==
- Клейн Л. С. Пляшущие человечки Конан-Дойля на Руси // Троицкий вариант — Наука. № 99. С. 14.
- Корзухина Г. Ф. Клады и случайные находки вещей круга «Древностей антов» в Среднем Поднепровье. Каталог памятников // МАИЭТ. Вып. V. Симферополь, 1996. С. 352—425, 525—705.
- Рыбаков Б. А. Древние русы // Советская археология. Т. XVII. 1953. С. 76-89.
- Dafydd Kidd, Ludmilla Pekarskaya, New Insight into the 6th-7th Century Silver Hoard from Martynovka (Ukraine), Mémoires de l'Association française d'archéologie mérovingienne, 1995, p. 351-360.
