= Kiev culture =

Archaeological culture of Europe

- Geographical range: Ukraine, South Russia, Belarus
- Period: Late Iron Age
- Dates: c. 200 – c. 450
- Preceded by: Zarubintsy culture Brushed Pottery culture Przeworsk culture
- Followed by: Prague-Korchak culture Penkovka culture Kolochin culture

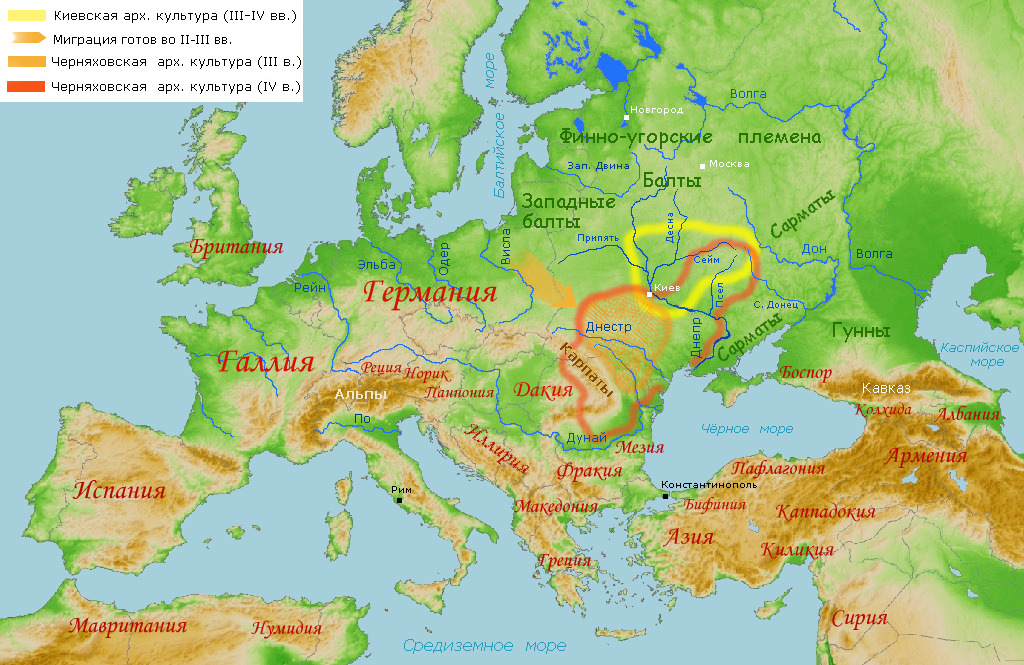
Wielbark culture, migration of Goths (orange arrow), the 2nd-3rd centuries, Chernyakhov culture (orange line), the 3rd century and (red line), the 4th century, Kyiv culture (yellow line), the 3rd-4th centuries

The Kiev culture (Russian: Киевская культура, romanized: Kievskaja kul'tura) or Kyiv culture (Ukrainian: Київська культура, romanized: Kyjivsjka kuljtura) is an archaeological culture dating from about the 3rd to 5th centuries, named after Kyiv, the capital of Ukraine. It is widely considered to be the first identifiable Slavic archaeological culture. It was located in the "middle and upper Dnieper basin, akin to it sites of the type Zaozer´e in the upper Dnieper and the upper Dvina basins, and finally the groups of sites of the type Cherepyn–Teremtsy in the upper Dniester basin and of the type Ostrov in the Pripyat basin, in Ukraine and Belarus. It was contemporaneous to (and located mostly just to the north of) the Chernyakhov culture.

Settlements are found mostly along river banks, frequently either on high cliffs or right by the edge of rivers. The dwellings are overwhelmingly of the semi-subterranean type (common among earlier Celtic and Germanic and later among Slavic cultures), often square (about four by four meters), with an open hearth in a corner. Most villages consist of just a handful of dwellings. There is very little evidence of the division of labor, although in one case a village belonging to the Kiev culture was preparing thin strips of antlers to be further reworked into the well-known Gothic antler combs, in a nearby Chernyakhov culture village.

The descendants of the Kiev culture — the Prague-Korchak, Penkovka and Kolochin cultures — established in the 5th century in Eastern Europe. There is, however, a substantial disagreement in the scientific community over the identity of the Kiev culture's predecessors, with some historians and archaeologists tracing it directly from the Milograd culture, others, from the Chernoles culture (the Scythian farmers of Herodotus) through the Zarubintsy culture, still others through both the Przeworsk culture and the Zarubintsy culture.

== Gallery ==
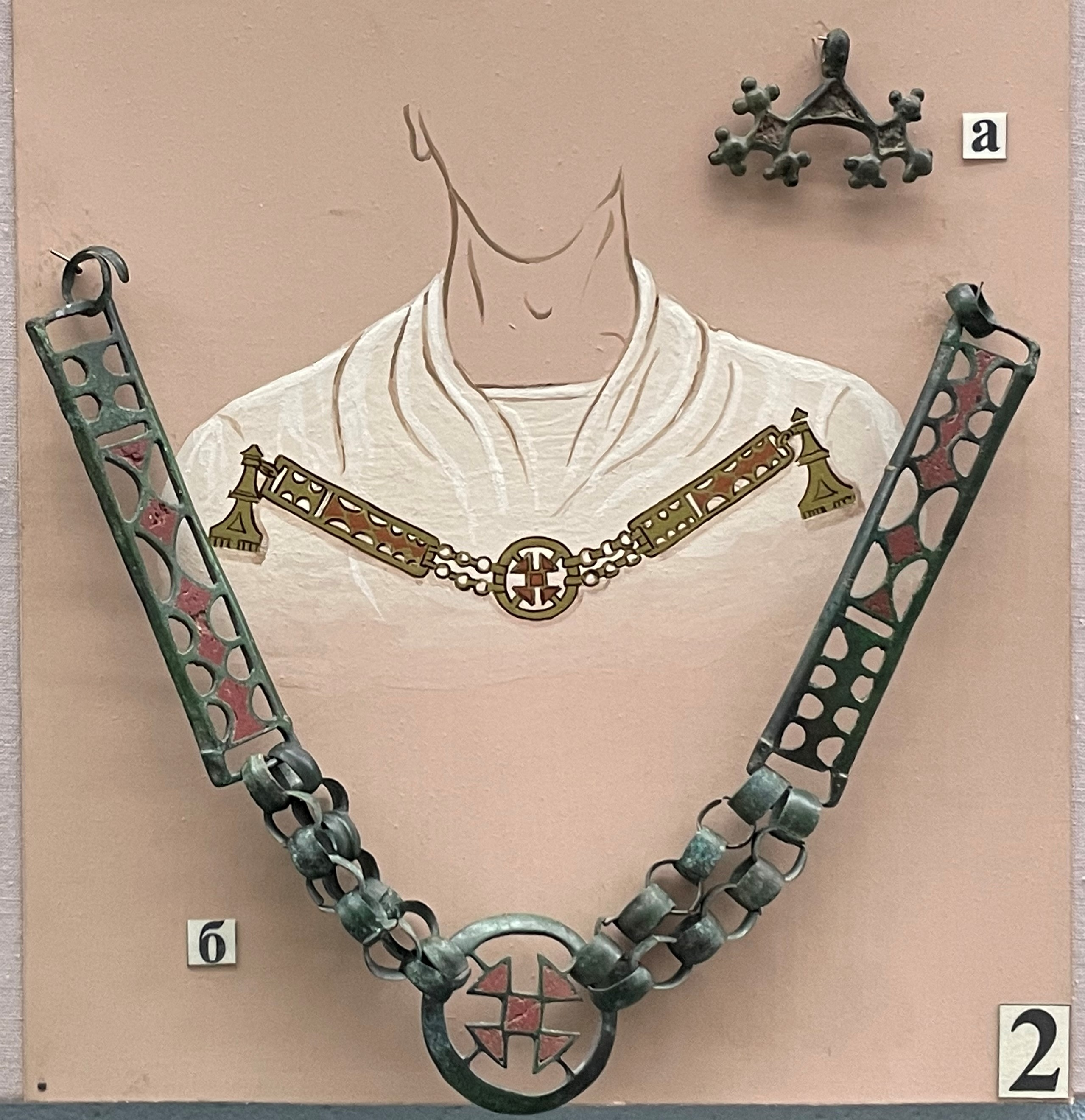
Kiev culture ornaments, 3rd-5th centuries AD

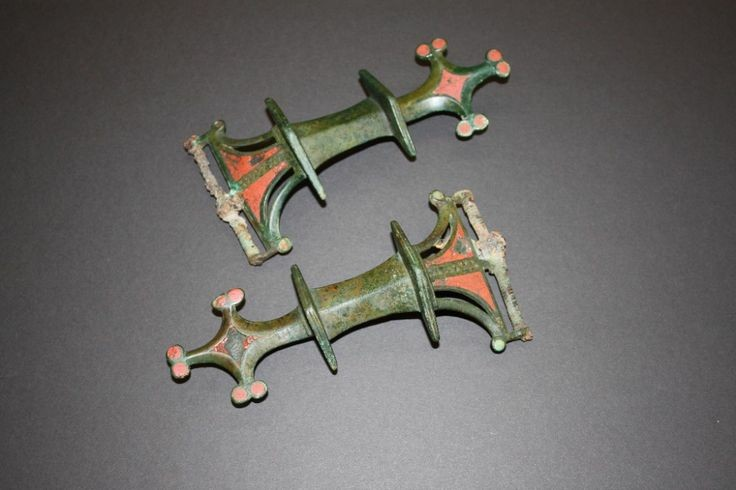
Fibulae of the Kiev culture, Suzemka, Bryansk Oblast, Russia
