= Dulebes =

Slavic tribe

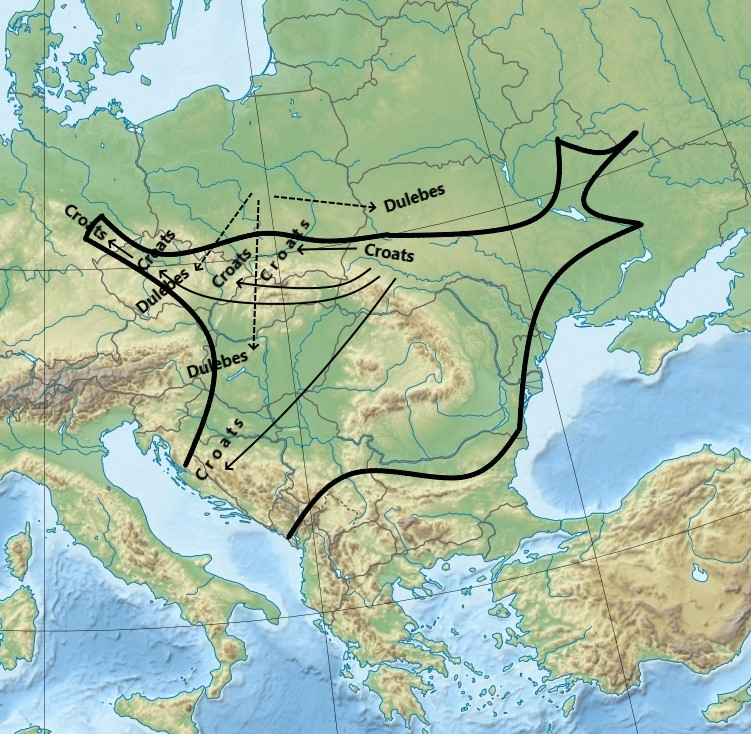
The range of Slavic ceramics of the Prague-Penkovka culture marked in black, and presumed location of three Early Medieval tribes of Dulebes in Central and Eastern Europe, per V. V. Sedov (1979).

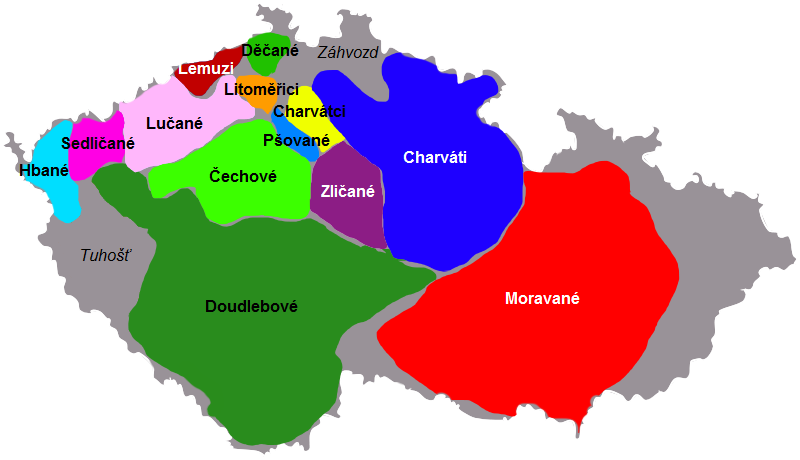
The presumed location of Dulebes (green) in present-day Czech Republic during the 10th century per abandoned hypothesis about the Czech tribes.

The Dulebes, Dulebs, Dudlebi or Duliby (Ukrainian: Дуліби) were one of the tribal unions of Early Slavs between the 6th and the 10th centuries. According to medieval sources they lived in Western Volhynia.

According to several toponyms of the tribal name, in the scholarship is also hypothesized that the branches of the tribe lived in southern parts of the Duchy of Bohemia and the Middle Danube between Lake Balaton and the Mur River (a tributary of the Drava) in the Principality of Hungary, probably implying migrations from a single region.

== Etymology ==
The etymological origin of their ethnonym is uncertain. Jan Długosz argued it derives from the name of their supposed progenitor, Duleba. Others, such as Oleg Trubachyov consider that the ethnonym existed before the Early Middle Ages because it derives from West Germanic languages; *dudlebi from *daud-laiba- in the meaning of "inheritance of the deceased", which would fit "with the early historical process of development of the lands by the Slavs abandoned at one time by the Germanic tribes". Initially, the Proto-Slavic tribe possibly was part of Przeworsk culture near Old Western Germanic area, but later belonged to the Prague-Korchak culture. It would be "only Slavic ethnonym with a Germanic etymology".

== History ==
The Primary Chronicle describes them as a tribe that formerly lived along the Bug river, "where the Volhynians now are found", in Volhynia what is today Western Ukraine. According to the chronicle, the Dulebi suffered greatly from the invasion of the Pannonian Avars in the late 6th or early 7th century:

"They made war upon the Slavs, and harassed the Dulebians, who were themselves Slavs. They even did violence to the Dulebian women. When an Avar made a journey, he did not cause either a horse or a steer to be harnessed, but gave command instead that three or four or five women should be yoked to his cart and be made to draw him. Even thus they harassed the Dulebians. The Avars were large of stature and proud of spirit, and God destroyed them."

Some scholars relate them to Antes, having seen a connection between the demise of the Antes by the Avars and the oppression of the Dulebes by the same Avars and the tradition recorded by Al-Masudi and Abraham ben Jacob that in ancient times the Walitābā (which some read as Walīnānā and identified with the Volhynians) were "the original, pure-blooded Saqaliba, the most highly honoured", who dominated the rest of the Slavic tribes, but whose "original organization was destroyed" and "the people divided into factions, each of them ruled by their own king", due to "dissent", as implying the existence of a Slavic federation which perished after the attack of the Avars.

In the East, in 907, a Dulebian unit took part in Oleg's military campaign against Czargrad (Constantinople). It appears that the Dulebi tribal union between 8th and 10th century formed or assimilated into the Volhynians, Drevlians, Polans, Dregoviches, and possibly Buzhans, eventually to become part of the Kievan Rus'.

=== Possible migration and branches of the tribe ===
Some consider that because of the oppression mentioned in the Primary Chronicle, some of them resettled along the Upper Vltava River in today's Southern Czech Republic, while others were part of the Slavic settlement of the Eastern Alps near Lake Balaton and Drava River in Carantania and today's southwestern Hungary. The place of their migration is uncertain and is argued to be from Volhynia to the West due to Avar invasion, or from the Vistula and Oder Rivers in all the directions because of supposed proximity with West Germanic tribes.

In the West, in the mid-10th century, Al-Masudi mentioned them as Dūlāba and their "king" (ruler) as Wānjslāf (most probably Wenceslaus I, Duke of Bohemia). According to the Chronica Boemorum chronicle by Cosmas of Prague (written in 1119–1125), a fortified settlement Doudleby, which exists even today, was part of Slavník's territory in the South Bohemian Region. However, their location and boundaries in the territory of Czech Republic is related to the abandoned hypothesis about the Czech tribes.

In Pannonian Basin, in the charter by Emperor of the Carolingian Empire, Louis II (843–876), appears Tudleipin in a list of possessions of the Salzburg archbishop Adalwin; church Dudleipin built by Duke of Lower Pannonia, Pribina (846–861), is recorded in Conversio Bagoariorum et Carantanorum (c. 870); comitatus Dudleipa is mentioned in the "Letter of King Arnulf of 891" written during the time of Otto II (973–983), the county probably located in the territory of later Vas County; a locality called Dulieb in the Upper Drava region is mentioned in the Tyrolean act from 1060. Part of these toponyms most probably was located near Bad Radkersburg and in-between of it and Leibnitz separated by Mur river. Today exist many hydronyms and toponyms on the territory of Poland, Austria, Slovenia, Croatia, Bosnia and Serbia which derive from *dudleb-.

== See also ==
- List of early Slavic peoples
- Bibliography of Russian history
