= Korchak culture =

Eastern European archaeological culture

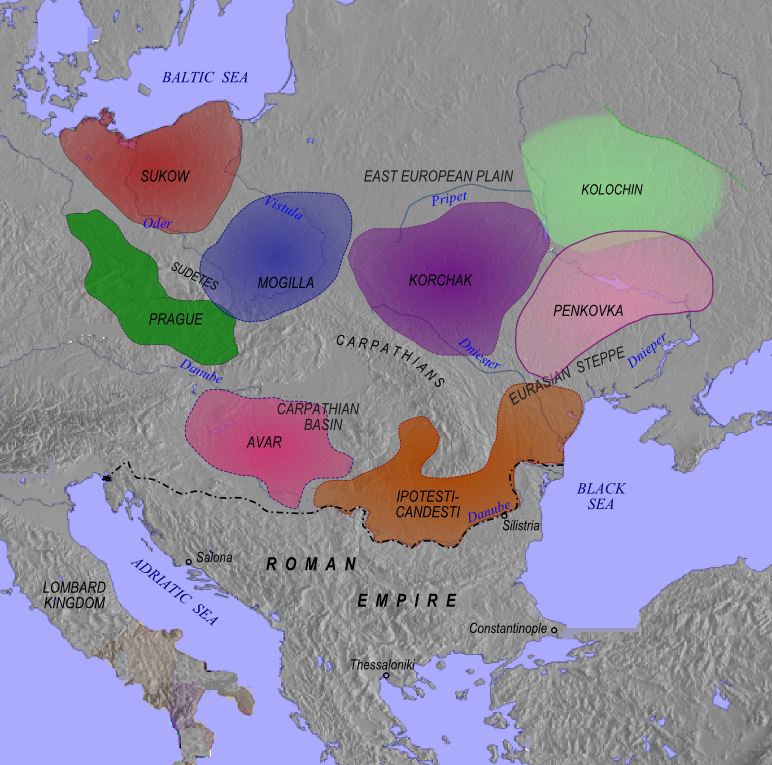
Archaeological cultures in Eastern Europe, 7th century Korchak culture

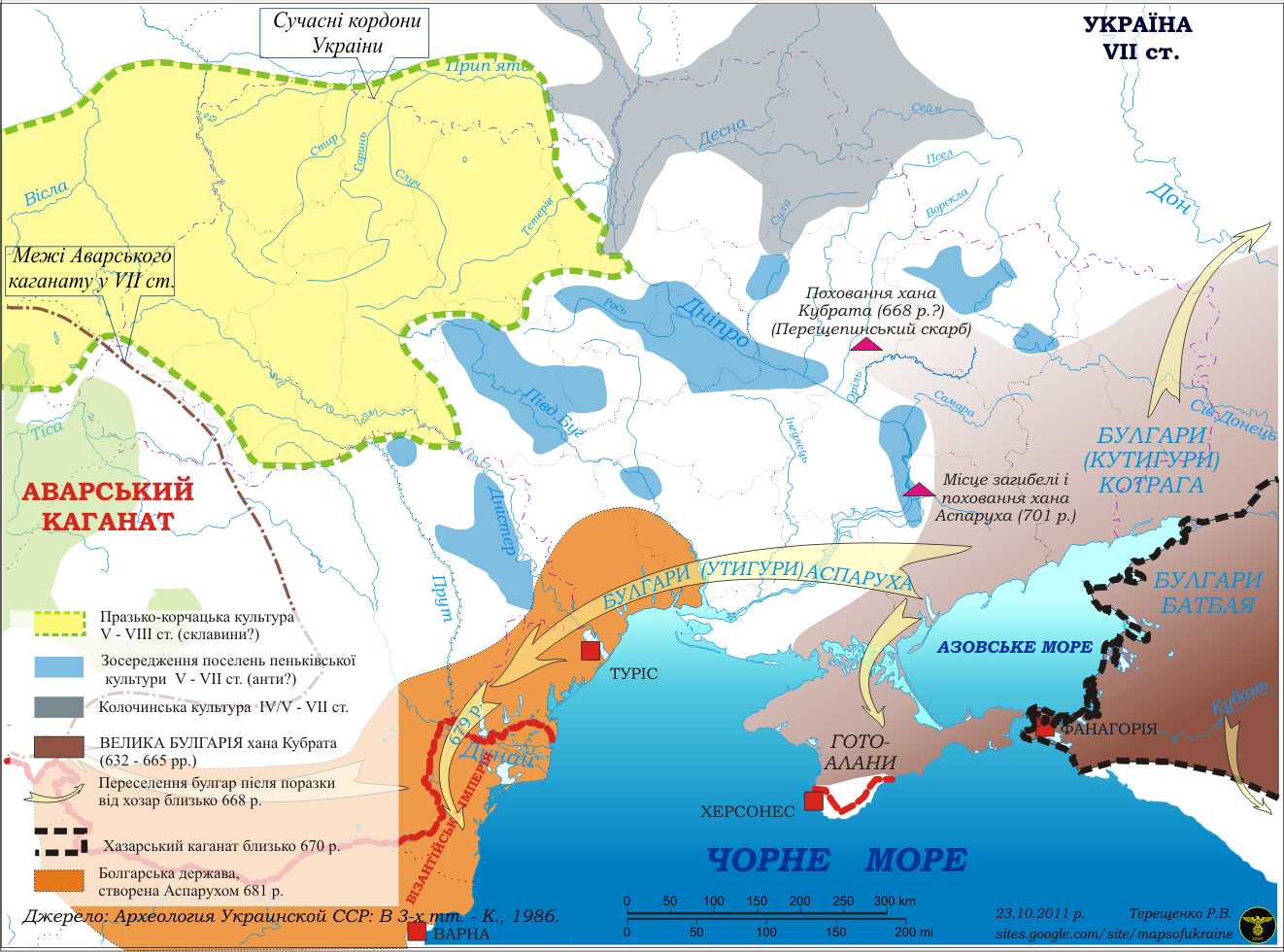
Early medieval archaeological cultures in Ukraine. Prague-Korchak culture (c. 5th–8th century) Kolochin culture (c. 4th–7th century) Penkivka culture (c. 5th–7th century)

The Korchak culture is an archaeological culture of the sixth and seventh century East Slavs who settled along the southern tributaries of the Pripyat River and from the Dnieper River to the Southern Bug and Dniester rivers, throughout modern-day northwestern Ukraine and southern Belarus.

It forms the eastern part of the so-called Prague-Korchak cultural horizon, a term used to encompass the entirety of postulated early Slavic cultures from the Elbe to the Dniester, as opposed to the eastern Penkovka culture.

== Archaeology ==
Excavations started in the 1920s by S. S. Gamchenko at the village of Korchak near Zhytomyr, Ukraine. The Korchak culture was identified as a distinct culture by lu. V. Kukharenko. Open settlements consisted of ten to twenty rectangular, semi-subterranean dwellings with a stone furnace placed in one corner. Each dwelling held up to five people, with less than 100 people per settlement. They performed cremation burial in kurgan burial mounds and in flat-grave cemeteries with cremations in urns. The culture is characterized by the specific shapes of modeled unadorned vessels, which represent the first stage in the development of Slavic pottery.

== See also ==
- List of Medieval Slavic tribes
- Bug-Dniester culture
- Carpathian Tumuli culture
