= Ipotești–Cândești culture =

Eastern European archaeological culture

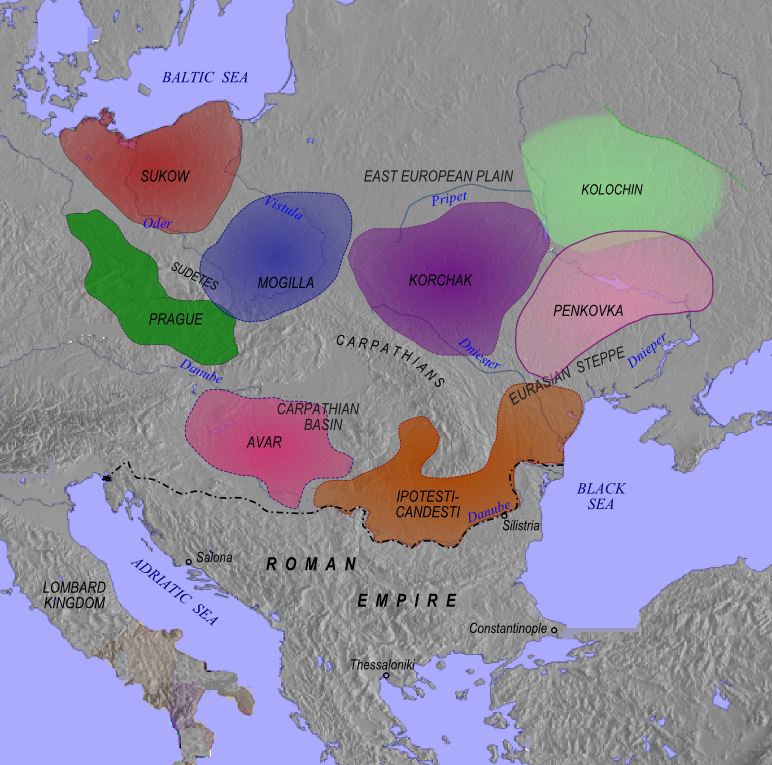
The Prague-Penkov-Kolochin group of archaeological cultures identified with early Slavic populations in the 6th and 7th centuries, and Ipotești–Cândești with local influences.

The Ipotești–Cândești culture (Romanian: Cultura Ipotești-Cândești, Ukrainian: культура Іпотешть-Киндешть) was an archaeological culture in Eastern Europe. It developed in the mid-6th century by the merger of elements of the Penkovka and Prague-Korchak cultures and local cultures (including Germanic and Roman) in the area between Prut and Lower Danube. It stretched in the Lower Danube over territory in Romania and Moldova. The population of the area was mostly made up of Early Slavs. There are views that it derived from the Chernyakhov culture and represented a group of the Antes, but also mixed with Sclaveni. The houses were identical to the Slavic huts of the Prague-Korchak and Penkovka areas. The sites in Romania are known as Ipotești-Candești-Ciurel or Ipotești-Ciurel-Cândești.

In terms of distribution of archaeological sites, the vast majority (132 out of 170 in total) associated with Ipotești-Cândești culture are situated between Argeș river and Bărăgan Plain. The largest density of settlements of this culture was found around what is today the city of Bucharest and Ilfov County, with a recorded number of 36 sites in and around the city and an additional 24 sites in the neighboring area of Snagov. Other areas with significant density are around Vadu Săpat, near Prahova river, which contains approximately 31 sites, and a cluster of 24 sites are located near Alexandria, Teleorman.

== Sources ==
- Cvijanović, Irena (2013). "The Typology of Early Medieval Settlements in Bohemia, Poland and Russia". In Rudić, Srđan (ed.). The World of the Slavs: Studies of the East, West and South Slavs: Civitas, Oppidas, Villas and Archeological Evidence (7th to 11th Centuries AD). Istorijski institut. pp. 289–344. ISBN 978-86-7743-104-4.
- Dolinescu-Ferche, Suzana (1984). "La cultur "Ipotești-Ciurel-Cândești" (V-VII siècles)". Dacia. 28: 117–148.
- Васильев, Г. Е. (2015). Русская историология. pp. 1017–. ISBN 978-5-4475-4624-3.
