= Antes people =

Early Slavic people inhabiting parts of Eastern Europe in the Early Middle Ages

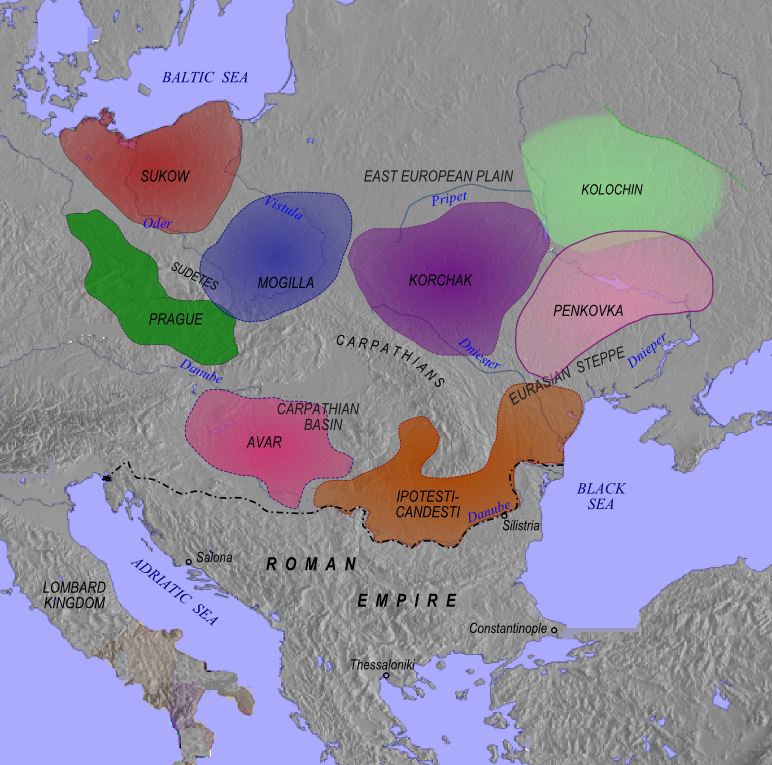
Archaeological cultures of the early 7th century identified with the early Slavs

Antes near Pontic Olbia

The Antes or Antae (Greek: Ἄνται) were an early Slavic tribal polity of the 6th century CE. They lived on the lower Danube River, in the northwestern Black Sea region (present-day Moldova and central Ukraine), and in the regions around the Don River (in Middle and Southern Russia). Scholars commonly associate the Antes with the archaeological Penkovka culture.

First mentioned in the historical record in 518, the Antes invaded the Byzantine Empire in the area of the Diocese of Thrace sometime between the years of 533 and 545. Thereafter, they became Byzantine foederati and received gold payments and a fort (named "Turris" – the Latin word turris means 'tower') somewhere north of the Danube at a strategically important location to prevent hostile barbarians from invading Byzantine lands. Thus from 545 to the 580s, Antean soldiers fought in various Byzantine campaigns. The Pannonian Avars, the Bulgars and the Khazars attacked the Antes in the 7th century, causing disappearance of the Antes as a group and of the Penkovka culture phenomenon.

== Origin ==
=== Historiography ===
Scholars have studied the Antes since the late 18th century. Based on the literary evidence provided by Procopius (c. 500–560 CE) and Jordanes (fl. c. 551), the Antes, along with the Sclaveni and the Venethi, have long been viewed as the constituent proto-Slavic peoples ancestral to both medieval Slavic ethnicities and modern Slavic nations. At times, debate over the origins and the descendants of the Antes has been heated. The tribe has been variously regarded as the ancestors of, specifically, the Vyatichi or the Rus (from a medieval perspective), and, in terms of extant populations, of the Ukrainians versus other East Slavs. Additionally, South Slavic historians have regarded the Antes as the ancestors of the eastern South Slavs.

=== Ethnolinguistic affinities ===
Although the Antes are regarded as a predominantly Slavic tribal union, numerous other theories of their ethnic components have arisen. The origins of their core ruling class have drawn particular attention, including theories that this ruling nobility was ethnically Iranic, Gothic, Slavic, or some mixture thereof. Much of this dispute has arisen from the scantness of the literary evidence: little is known of the Antes apart from the tribal name itself and a handful of anthroponyms. The name Antes itself does not appear to be Slavic, and is often held to be an Iranian word. Omeljan Pritsak, citing Max Vasmer, argues that because anta- means "frontier, end" in Sanskrit, *ant-ya could mean "frontiersman" or "that which is at the end"; and in Ossetian att'iya means "the last, behind". F.P. Filin and Oleg Trubachyov shared this opinion. In contrast, Bohdan Struminskyj considered the etymology of Antes unproven and "irrelevant". Struminskyj analyzed the personal names of Antean chiefs and offered Germanic etymological alternatives to the commonly accepted Slavic etymologies that had first been proposed by Stanisław Rospond.

Although the first unequivocal attestation of the Antes tribe is from the 6th century CE, scholars (e.g. Vernadsky) have tried to connect the Antes with a tribe rendered as Yancai 奄蔡 (< LHC *ʔɨam^{A}-sɑ^{C} < OC (125 BCE) *ʔɨam-sɑs; compare Latin Abzoae, identified with the Aorsi (Ancient Greek Αορσιοι)) in the Records of the Grand Historian, a 2nd-century-BCE Chinese source. Pliny the Elder mentions some Anti living near the shores of the Azov Sea, and inscriptions from the Kerch Peninsula dating to the 3rd century CE bear the word antas. Based on documentation of "Sarmatian" tribes inhabiting the north Pontic region during the early centuries of the Common Era, presumed Iranic loanwords in Slavic languages, and Sarmatian "cultural borrowings" into the Penkovka culture, scholars such as Paul Robert Magocsi, Valentin Sedov, and John V.A. Fine Jr. maintain earlier proposals by Soviet-era scholars such as Boris Rybakov, that the Antes were originally a Sarmatian–Alan frontier tribe that become Slavicized but preserved their name. Sedov argues that the ethnonym referred to the Slavic–Scythian–Sarmatian population living between the Dniester and Dnieper Rivers, and later to the related Slavic tribes who emerged from this Slavic–Iranian symbiosis.

However, more-recent perspectives view the tribal entities named by Graeco-Roman sources as fluctuant political formations that were, above all, etic categorizations based on ethnographic stereotypes rather than on first-hand, accurate knowledge of the barbarian language or "culture." Bartłomiej Szymon Szmoniewski argues that the Antes were not a "discrete, ethnically homogeneous entity" but rather "a highly complex political reality". Linguistically, contemporary evidence suggests that Proto-Slavic was the common language of an area that extended from the eastern Alps to the Black Sea and was spoken by peoples of varying ethnic backgrounds, including Slavs, provincial Romans, Germanic tribes (such as the Gepids and Lombards), and Turkic peoples (such as the Avars and Bulgars).

== History ==
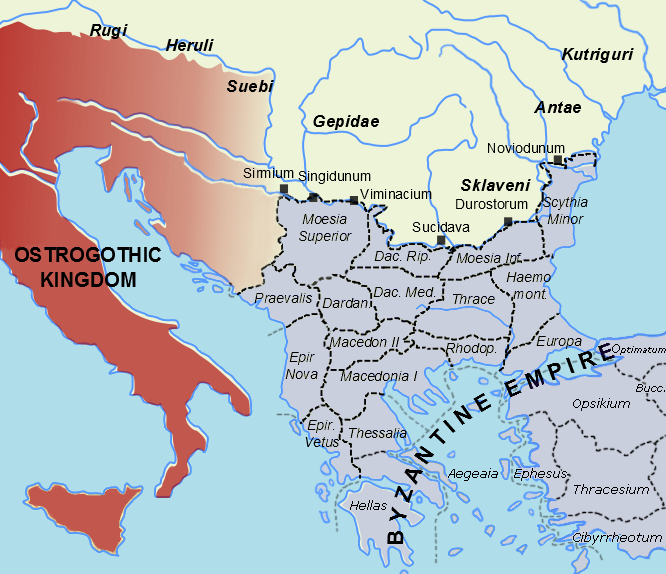
The political situation in Southeastern Europe around 520 AD – the post-Hun period and prior to Byzantine re-conquest of Gothic Italy

=== Early history ===
According to historians who argue for a connection between the Antes and the Sarmatians, the Antes were a subgroup of the Alans, who dominated the Black Sea and North Caucasus region during the Late Sarmatian Period. The Antes were based between the Bug and lower Dnieper in the 1st–2nd centuries CE. In the 4th century, their center of power shifted northward toward the southern Bug. In the 5th and 6th centuries, they settled in Volhynia and subsequently in the middle Dnieper region near the present-day city of Kyiv. As they moved north from the open steppe to the forest steppe, they organized the Slavic tribes, and the name Antes came to be used for the mixed Slavo–Alanic polity.

Whatever the exact origins of the tribe, Jordanes and Procopius both appear to suggest that the Antes were Slavic by the 5th century. In describing the lands of Scythia, Jordanes states that "the populous race of the Venethi occupy a great expanse of land. Though their names are now dispersed amid various clans and places, yet they are chiefly called Sklaveni and Antes." Later on, in describing the exploits of Ermanaric, the legendary king of the Ostrogothic, Jordanes writes that the Veneti "now go by three names: Veneti, Antes, and Sclaveni", noting that they had once been conquered by the Goths under Ermanaric. Finally, he describes a battle between the Antean king Boz and Ermanaric's successor Vinitharius after the latter's subjugation by the Huns. After initially defeating the Goths, the Antes lost the second battle, and Boz and 70 of his leading nobles were crucified (Get. 247). Scholars have traditionally taken the accounts of Jordanes as face-value evidence that the Sklaveni and (the bulk of the) Antes descended from the Venedi, a tribe known to historians such as Tacitus, Ptolemy, and Pliny the Elder since the 2nd century CE.

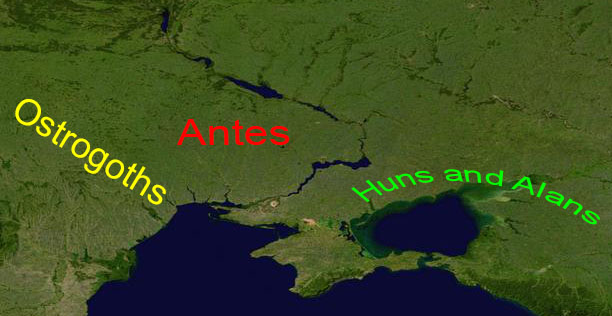
Map of the Ostrogoths, Antes, Huns and Alans in AD 380, which places the Antes to the west of the Dnieper

However, the utility of Getica as an accurate work of ethnography has been questioned. Walter Goffart, for example, argues that Getica created an entirely mythical story of Gothic and other peoples' origins. (Note: The very purpose of Jordanes' narrative, especially with regard to the alleged Scandinavian origin of the Goths, was to show that there was no place for the Goths in Roman territory. Together with his enumeration of other barbarian tribes in Scythia and around Dacia, Jordanes was stating that Scythia is overpopulated with barbarians, and the Goths should belong to the frozen wastelands of the North. Jordanes only feigned his own Gothic roots, and his work is designed to celebrate the destruction of the Gothic kingdom by the Byzantines. (Goffart, 2006)) Florin Curta further argues that Jordanes had no real ethnographic knowledge of "Scythia," despite claims that he himself was a Goth and was born in Thrace. He borrowed heavily from earlier historians and only artificially linked the 6th-century Sklaveni and Antes with the earlier Venethi, who had otherwise long disappeared by that century. This anachronism was paired with a "modernizing narrative strategy" whereby Jordanes retold older events – the war between the Ostrogothic Vithimiris and the Alans – as a war between Vinitharius and the contemporary Antes. In any case, no 4th-century source mentions the Antes, and the "Ostrogoths" did not form until the 5th century – inside the Balkans. Some scholars related to the Antes the Anthaib (mentioned in Origo Gentis Langobardorum of the 8th century History of the Lombards), a land which Lombards had to pass through and ruled before reaching modern day Austria in the 5th century.

Apart from the influence of older historians, Jordanes' narrative style was shaped by his polemical debate with his contemporary Procopius. While Jordanes linked the Sclaveni and Antes with the ancient Venedi, Procopius states that they were both once called Sporoi. (Note: The term Spori is a hapax, but might have been inspired by the tribe "Spali" (curta, 1999. FN 36))

=== Location in 6th century ===
Jordanes and Procopius have been seen as invaluable sources in locating the Antes with greater precision. Jordanes (Get. 25) states that they dwelt "along the curve of the Black Sea" from the Dniester to the Dnieper. Paul M. Barford questions whether this implies they occupied the steppe or the regions further north, although most scholars generally place the Antes in the forest steppe zone of right-bank Ukraine. In contrast, Procopius locates them just beyond the northern banks of the Danube (Wars V 27.1–2) (i.e., Wallachia). The lack of consistency in geography demonstrates that the Antes stretched well across Sarmatian Scythia, rather than being a small and distant polity. (Note: Eg Jordanes states Scythia extends as far as the "Tyras" and "Danaster", although they are two names for the same river (Dniester). Procopius thought the Caucasus mountains extended as far as Illyricum. (Curta, 199, p. 327-8))

=== 6th and 7th centuries ===
The first contact between the Byzantines and the Antes was in 518 CE. Recorded by Procopius, the Antean raid appeared to coincide with the Vitalian' revolt, but was intercepted and defeated by the magister militum per Thraciam Germanus. Germanus was replaced by Chilbudius in the early 530s, who was killed three years later during an expedition against the various Sklavenoi. With the death of Chilbudius, Justinian appears to have changed his policy against Slavic barbarians from offense to defense, exemplified by his grand program of refortifying garrisons along the Danube.

In 537, Justinian recruited 1,600 mounted mercenaries of Sclaveni and Antes to aid the rescue of Belisarius in Italy against the Ostrogoths. Procopius notes that in 539–40, the Sklavenes and Antes "became hostile to one another and engaged in battle," probably encouraged by the Romans' traditional tactic of "divide and conquer." Nevertheless, both Procopius and Jordanes report numerous raids by "Huns," Slavs, Bulgars, and Antes in the years 539–40 CE, reporting that some 32 forts and 120,000 Roman prisoners were captured. Sometime between 533 and 545, the Antes invaded the Diocese of Thrace, enslaving many Romans and taking them north of the Danube to the Antean homelands. Indeed, numerous raids were conducted during this turbulent decade by numerous barbarian groups, including the Antes. The two tribes were at peace by 545. Notably, one of the captured Antes claimed to be Roman general Chilbudius (who was killed in 534 by barbarians at the Danube). He was sold to the Antes and freed. He revealed his true identity but was pressured and continued to claim that he was Chilbudius. Procopius of Caesarea wrote concerning these events:

"(...) In Illyria and Thracia, from the Ionian Gulf to Byzantine surrounding cities, where Hellas and Chersonese regions are situated, (...) the Sclavenes and the Antes, penetrating practically every year since Justinian administering the Roman Empire, were inflicting irreversible damage to their inhabitants. In each invasion, I estimate 200,000 Romans were either taken as prisoners or killed (...)".

In 545, the Antes became Roman allies (after approaching the Romans) and were given gold payments and a fort named "Turris" somewhere north of the Danube (possibly Tyras, Pietroasele, or Dinogetia) at a strategically important location, in order to prevent hostile barbarians invading Roman lands. This was part of a larger set of alliances, including the Lombards, lifting pressure off the lower Danube and enabling forces to be diverted to Italy. Thus, in 545, Antean soldiers were fighting in Lucania against Ostrogoths, and in the 580s they attacked the settlements of the Sklavenes at the behest of the Romans. In 555 and 556, Dabragezas (of Antean origin) led the Roman fleet in Crimea against Persian positions.

The Antes remained Roman allies until their demise in the first decade of the 7th century. They were often involved in conflicts with the Avars, such as the war recorded by Menander the Guardsman (50, frg 5.3.17–21) in the 560s. In 602, in retaliation for a Roman attack on their Sklavene allies, the Avars sent their general Apsich to "destroy the nation of the Antes." Despite numerous defections to the Romans during the campaign, the Avar attack appears to have ended the Antean polity. They never again appear in sources, apart from the epithet Anticus in the imperial titulature in 612. Curta argues that the 602 attack on the Antes destroyed their political independence. However, based on the aforementioned attestation of Anticus, Georgios Kardaras rather argues that the disappearance of the Antes stemmed from the general collapse of the Scythian/lower Danubian limes they defended, ending their hegemony on the lower Danube.

=== Fall ===
Scholars often associated the fall of the Antes with the attack of the Avars. Others have seen a remote connection between the demise of the Antes and the oppression of the Dulebes by the Avars mentioned in the Primary Chronicle, and/or the tradition recorded by Al-Masudi and Abraham ben Jacob that in ancient times the Walitābā (which some read as Walīnānā and identified with the Volhynians) were "the original, pure-blooded Saqaliba, the most highly honoured" and dominated the rest of the Slavic tribes, but due to "dissent" their "original organization was destroyed" and "the people divided into factions, each of them ruled by their own king", implying existence of a Slavic federation which perished after the attack of the Avars.

However, according to Michel Kazanski, the downfall of the Antes, associated Penkovka culture and Martynivka-type hoards, happened in the first half of the 7th century with the arrival of the Bulgars and then Khazars who probably acted on the behest of the Byzantine Empire against the Antes. From the west and south arrived Slavs with Prague-Korchak cultural traditions, although small groups of Antes could have survived around Southern Bug and Moldova, according to Kazanski the "main bulk of the Pen'kivka population may have retreated from the middle Dnieper to the north, to the area of their distant cousins, the Kalochyn culture population".

== Aftermath ==
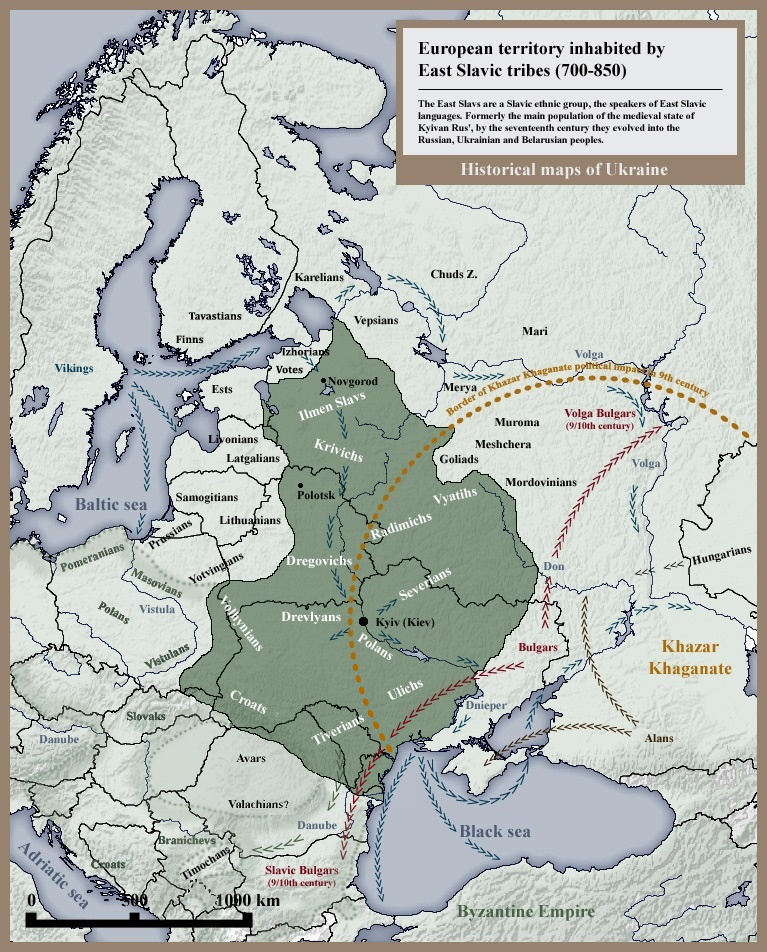
European territory inhabited by East Slavic tribes in 8th and 9th century

Out of the old Antes federation, some of the following tribes are assumed to have evolved:

- Croats, north of the Carpathian Mountains in Prykarpattia (and Zakarpattia)
- Drevlians, between the Pripyat and Horyn rivers
- Dulebes, in Volhynia between the Vistula, Buh, and Styr rivers
- Polans, between Kyiv and Roden
- Severians, along the Desna and upper Seym and Sula rivers
- Tiverians, along the Dniester River
- Ulichians, between Dniester and Dnieper in the forest-steppe zone

However, their association with Antes, like in the case of Croats, is often unclear and not critical enough regarding various scientific evidence of the migration period. The tribes living in Western Ukraine (Buzhans, Croats, Drevlians, Dregoviches, Polans, Tivertsi, Ulichs and Volhynians) are considered to be between 7th and 10th century part of the Sakhnivka-Luka-Raikovetska culture, meanwhile in the Dnieper area (Severians, Radimichs) part of the Volyntsevo-Romny-Borshchevo culture, both of which originating from the Prague-Korchak culture identified with the eastward movement of the Sclaveni.

== Rulers ==
- Boz (fl. 376–80), king of Antae and first known Slavic ruler
- Dabragezas (fl. 555–56), led Roman fleet in Crimea against Persian positions
- Idariz, or Idarisius (fl. 562), father of Mezamir
- Mezamir (fl. 562), powerful Antae archon
- Kelagast (fl. 562), brother of Mezamir

== See also ==
- Sclaveni
- Venethi
- List of ancient Slavic peoples

== Sources ==
- Baran, Volodymyr (1988), "The Veneti, Sclaveni and Antae in the Light of Archaeology", Ukrainian Review, 45
- Barford, P M (2001). The Early Slavs: Culture and Society in Early Medieval Eastern Europe. Cornell University Press. ISBN 9780801439773.
- Curta, Florin (2001). The Making of the Slavs: History and Archaeology of the Lower Danube Region, c. 500–700. Cambridge: Cambridge University Press. ISBN 9781139428880.
- Curta, Florin (2009), "The early Slavs in Bohemia and Moravia: a response to my critics", Archeologické Rozhledy, 61
- Curta, Florin (2004), "The Slavic lingua franca (Linguistic notes of an archaeologist turned historian)", East Central Europe, 31 (1): 125–148, doi:10.1163/187633004X00134
- Curta, Florin (1999), "Hiding behind a piece of tapestry: Jordanes and the Slavic Venethi", Jahrbücher für Geschichte Osteuropas, 47
- Fine, John V.A. (2006). When Ethnicity Did Not Matter in the Balkans: A Study of Identity in Pre-Nationalist Croatia, Dalmatia, and Slavonia in the Medieval and Early-Modern Periods. The University of Michigan Press. ISBN 0472025600.
- Gimbutas, Marija (1971), The Slavs, Thames & Hudson Ltd
- Goffart, Walter (2006). Barbarian tides : the migration age and the later Roman Empire. Philadelphia, Pa.: University of Pennsylvania Press. ISBN 978-0-8122-3939-3.
- Kardaras, Georgios (2010), "The Byzantine-Antic treaty (545/46 A. D.) and the defense of Scythia Minor", Byzantinoslavica: Revue internationale des Études Byzantines, 68 (1–2): 74–85
- Kazanski, Michel (2013). "The Middle Dnieper area in the seventh century: An archaeological survey". Travaux et Mémoires. 17 (1): 769–864. ISBN 978-2-916716-45-9.
- Magosci, Paul Robert (2010). A History of Ukraine (2nd ed.). University of Toronto Press. ISBN 978-0-8020-7820-9.
- Pritsak, Omeljan (1983). "The Slavs and the Avars". Gli Slavi occidentali e meridionali nell'Alto Medioevo : [30] Settimana di studio del Centro italiano di studi sull'Alto Medioevo, 15-21 aprile 1982. Spoleto: Centro italiano di studi sull'Alto Medioevo. pp. 353–435. ISBN 88-7988-029-2.
- Schuessler, Axel (2014). "Phonological Notes on Hàn Period Transcriptions of Foreign Names and Words" (PDF). Studies in Chinese and Sino-Tibetan Linguistics: Dialect, Phonology, Transcription and Text. Language and Linguistics Monograph Series (53). Taipei, Taiwan: Institute of Linguistics, Academia Sinica. Archived from the original (PDF) on 2021-06-07.
- Sedov, Valentin (1996). "Tribal Societies in Eastern Europe". In de Laet, Sigfried J. (ed.). History of Humanity: From the seventh century B.C. to the seventh century A.D. UNESCO. ISBN 923102812X.
- Sedov, Valentin Vasilyevich (2012) [1994]. Славяне в древности [Sloveni u dalekoj prošlosti (Slavs in the distant past)]. Novi Sad: Akademska knjiga. ISBN 978-86-6263-022-3.
- Sedov, Valentin Vasilyevich (1995). Славяне в раннем Средневековье [Slavs in Early Middle Ages] (in Russian). Moscow: Фонд археологии. ISBN 5-87059-021-3. 415 pages
- Shchukin, Mark B. (1986), "The Balto-Slavic Forest Direction in the Archaeological Study of the Ethnogenesis of the Slavs", Wiadomosci Archeologiczne, 1
- Strumins'kyj, Bohdan (1979), "Were the Antes Eastern Slavs?" (PDF), Harvard Ukrainian Studies, 3/4: 786–796, archived from the original (PDF) on 2022-01-20
- Szmoniewski, B. S. (2012). "The Antes: Eastern "Brothers" of the Sclavenes ?". In Curta, Florin (ed.). Neglected Barbarians. Brepols. ISBN 978-2-503-53125-0.
- Živković, Tibor (2008). Forging unity: The South Slavs between East and West 550-1150. Belgrade: The Institute of History, Čigoja štampa. ISBN 9788675585732.
