= South Russia =

South Russia may refer to:

- Southern Russia
- South Russia (1919–1920), a territory that existed during the Russian Civil War in Ukraine and the north Caucasus

== See also ==
- South Russian Ovcharka, a breed of sheepdog
- Southern Russian dialects
