= Penkovka culture =

Archaeological culture of late antiquity in Eastern Europe

- Period: Late Iron Age
- Dates: c. 425 – c. 700
- Preceded by: Kiev culture Chernyakhov culture
- Followed by: Volyntsevo culture Luka-Raikovetska culture Saltovo-Mayaki culture

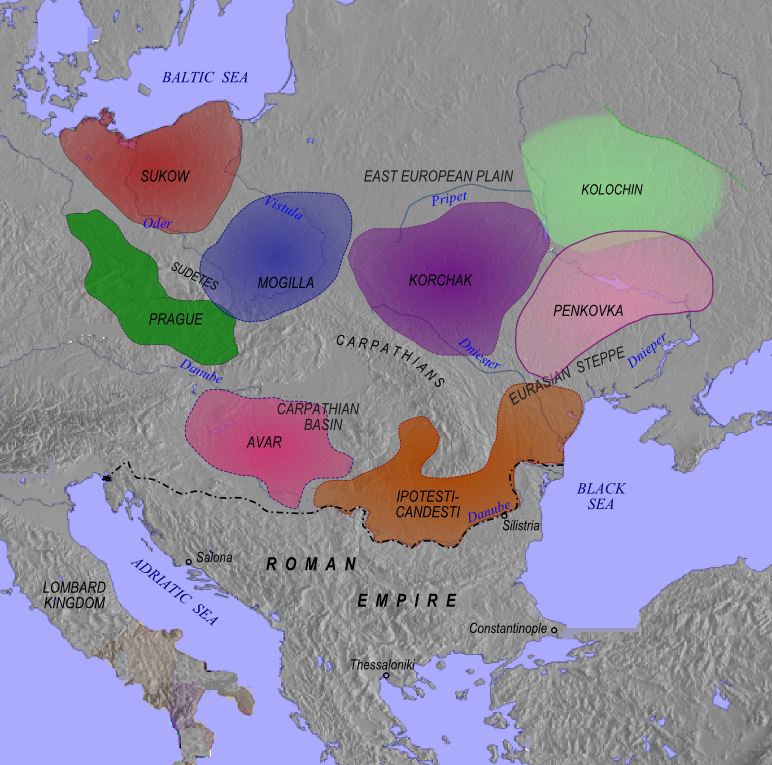
The Prague-Penkov-Kolochin group of archaeological cultures identified with early Slavic populations in the 6th and 7th centuries.

The Penkovka culture (Ukrainian: Пеньківська культура, romanized: Penkivska kultura; also called Penkivka culture or Penkivska culture) is an archaeological culture in Ukraine, Moldova and reaching into Romania. Its western boundary is usually taken to at the middle Prut and Dniester rivers, where contact with the Korchak culture occurs. Its bearers are commonly identified as the Antes people of 6th-century Byzantine historiography.

== Geography ==
The core of the culture seems to be in Left-bank Ukraine, especially along the Sula, Seim, Psel, Donets and Oril rivers. But its territory extends to Right-bank Ukraine, and Penkovka pottery is also found in eastern and southern Romania, where it co-exists with wheel-made pottery of late Roman derivation, and is referred to as the Ipotești–Cândești culture by Romanian archaeologists. Penkovka-type pottery has even been found in Byzantine forts in the north-eastern Balkans. Hand-made Penkovka pottery is distinguished from Prague-Korchak types on the basis of its biconical profile and tendency for out-turned rims. The pottery and other findings are so similar to the Kolochin culture that Michel Kazanski and other archaeologists consider a common origin from the Kyiv culture. Some consider that of the ancestors of the bearers of the Penkovka culture were population of the Chernyakhov culture, which should be described as a multi-ethnic culture dominated by the Goths.

However, Florin Curta has argued that there can be no simple relationship between the type of ceramic vessel and the ethnicity of groups which consumed them. E. Teodor performed a detailed analysis of ceramic vessels in 6th century southeastern Europe, and discovered a complex picture which cannot be reduced to 2 or 3 broad 'archaeological cultures', as each microregion and even individual site shows idiosyncrasies in their ceramic profile and degree of connectivity to other regions of 'Slavic Europe'.

== Penkovka settlements ==
Penkovka settlements tended to be located on the terraces of rivers, usually arranged in a linear fashion. Buildings were usually square, post-hole constructs dug into the ground, equipped with an oven in the corners. There were also rounded buildings, otherwise not found in other Slavic territories, which have been associated with a nomadic influence. However, they are different from traditional tent-like nomadic yurts. Settlements tended to be abandoned after a period of habitation and were often re-occupied years later, reflective of the itinerant form of agriculture practiced by the populace. Two fortified sites are known from the Penkovka region—Seliste and Pastyrske. The latter has been excavated in detail, and appears to have been an Iron Age fortification which was also occupied in early medieval times. Measuring 25 ha, it included numerous settlement buildings as well as evidence of specialised industrial activity. Szmoniewski argues that "Pastyrs'ke may have also been a political power center, the seat of a ruler with territorial authority".

Two forms of burials are found north of the Black Sea in the 6th and 7th centuries. Poorly furnished cremation burials, either inside urns or into shallow pits, are concentrated in the forest-steppe zone; whilst more elaborately equipped inhumations are found in the open steppe. Traditionally, the latter are attributed to "Turkic" nomads whilst the cremation burials were a typically Slavic rite. However, a straightforward ethnic attribution has been questioned—as the pottery and metalwork (see below) found in the 'nomadic' inhumations shows clear analogies to that found in 'Slavic' settlements in the forest-zone. Thus Curta has argued that the inhumation burials represented a marker of social distinction of chiefs and 'big men' from the forest-zone settlements.

== Antian antiquities ==
Another set of cultural elements of Penkovka and Kolochin cultures associated with Antes are numerous hoards of silver and gold ornaments dated to the 7th century, and are variously called "Antian antiquites" or the Martynivka culture (named after the Martynivka Treasure).

It is considered that the metalwork reveals a variety of influences, especially the world of the steppe nomads, which in turn showed Caucasian, Byzantine, and Sassanian inspiration. Yet other elements showed affinities with the 'Balto-Slavic' world of the forests of Eastern Europe. Kazanski concluded it has eastern Germanic (Goths, Gepids, Lombards), Byzantine, steppe nomadic and forest zone roots and influences. He also noted that the Byzantine military influences are lacking among steppe nomads, neither did the Turkic nomands wear brooches between the 5th and 7th century.

Scholars have debated to whom the Martynivka elements belonged since the late 19th century. A. Spitsyn attributed them to the Slavic Antes, whilst J. Harmatta rather attributed them to Turkic groups, specifically the Kutrigurs. Curta has argued that in the early 7th century such metalwork appears in hoards deposited in the forest-steppe, whilst later assemblages appear as interment gifts in 'nomadic burials'. Thus, again, rather than simplistic ethnic explanations, Curta's analysis suggests that the pattern of ornament consumption varied with time and was related to social status and gender. That is, earlier in the 6th century, elites displayed status by burying hoards of silver in the forest-steppe, whilst later there was more aggressive posturing and status display in the form of richly furnished male warrior graves, no doubt related to the competition for supremacy on the north Black Sea region between Pannonian Avars, Bulgars, Khazars and Western Göktürks.

Curta considers that the equation of the Penkovka culture and Martynivka hoards with the Antes is problematic, as such cultural features exist into the 8th century, long after the Antes were defeated by the Avars in 602 AD and ceased to exist as an independent tribal polity. According to him, such diffuse styles cannot be directly linked to any single people, but rather reflect a myriad of peoples who existed in the Black Sea region from 450–750 AD, including Antes, Kutrigurs and Bulgars. Kazanski refutes Curta's argumentation, concluding that "the limited archaeological evidence hardly suggests a symbiosis of the Pen'kivka population and the nomads, as suggested in some recent studies ... with the possible exception of the final stage of the Pen'kivka culture, on the eve of its disappearance. The interpretation of the Pen'kivka culture as non-homogenous ... is even less grounded. This culture, on the contrary, has a very uniform appearance, and while cultural homogeneity does not prove anthropological, linguistic, and ethnic unity, it is an argument for its existence".

== Fall ==
Penkovka culture's fall, and deposition of Martynivka type hoards, is considered to be related to the invasion of the steppe nomads, the Bulgars and Khazars, who probably acted on the behest of the Byzantine Empire. Its disappearance can be archaeologically dated around the second-half of the 7th century.

Over all Penkovka sites emerged nomadic style wheel-made pottery (called Pastyrske or Saltovo ware), most commonly found within the Saltovo-Mayaki culture, associated with Bulgars, Khazars and Alans. In Moldova and Dnieper area at the end of the 7th and beginning of the 8th century it was replaced by eastward migration of Slavic population of Sakhnivka-Luka-Raikovetska culture and Volyntsevo-Romny-Borshchevo culture, both of them originating from Prague-Korchak cultural tradition.

== Literature ==
- Stefka Angelova; Rumjana Koleva (2007), "Archäologische Zeugnisse frühslawischer Besiedlung in Bulgarien", in Wolfram Brandes; Alexander Demandt; Helmut Krasser; Hartmut Leppin; Hartmut Leppi (eds.), Post-Roman Towns, Trade and Settlement in Europe and Byzantium Vol. 2, Walter de Gruyter, ISBN 9783110183580
- Baran, Volodymyr (1988). "The Veneti, Sclaveni and Antae in the Light of Archaeology". Ukrainian Review. 45.
- Barford, Paul M (2001). The Early Slavs: Culture and Society in Early Medieval Eastern Europe. Cornell University Press. ISBN 978-0-8014-3977-3.
- Curta, Florin (2001). The Making of the Slavs: History and Archaeology of the Lower Danube Region, c. 500–700. Cambridge: Cambridge University Press. ISBN 9781139428880.
- Curta, Florin (2008). "The north-western region of the Black Sea during the 6th and early 7th century AD". Ancient West & East. 7: 151–187. doi:10.2143/AWE.7.0.2033257.
- Fiedler, Uwe (2008). "Bulgars on the Lower Danube. A survey of the archaeological evidence and of the state of current research". In Florin Curta; Roman Kovalev (eds.). The Other Europe in the Middle Ages – Avars, Bulgars, Khazars, and Cumans. Brill. ISBN 978-90-04-16389-8.
- Gimbutas, Marija Alseikaitė (1971). The Slavs. Thames and Hudson. ISBN 978-0-500-02072-2.
- Kazanski, Michel (2013). "The Middle Dnieper area in the seventh century: An archaeological survey". Travaux et Mémoires. 17 (1): 769–864. ISBN 978-2-916716-45-9.
- Sedov, Valentin (1996). "Tribal Societies in Eastern Europe". In Sigfried J. de Laet (ed.). History of Humanity: From the seventh century B.C. to the seventh century A.D. UNESCO. ISBN 923102812X.
- Shchukin, Mark B. (1986). "The Balto-Slavic Forest Direction in the Archaeological Study of the Ethnogenesis of the Slavs". Wiadomosci Archeologiczne. 1.
- Szmoniewski, B. S. (2012). "The Antes: Eastern "Brothers" of the Sclavenes ?". In Curta, Florin (ed.). Neglected Barbarians. Brepols. ISBN 978-2-503-53125-0.
- Szmoniewski, Bartlomiej (2008). "Two worlds, one hoard: what do metal finds from the forest-steppe belt speak about?". In Florin Curta; Roman Kovalev (eds.). The Other Europe in the Middle Ages – Avars, Bulgars, Khazars, and Cumans. Brill. ISBN 978-90-04-16389-8.
- Teodor, Eugene (2005). "The Shadow of a Frontier: The Walachian Plain during the Justinianic Age". In Florin Curta (ed.). Borders, Barriers, and Ethnogenesis Frontiers in Late Antiquity and the Middle Ages. Brepols. ISBN 978-2-503-51529-8.
