= Vyatichi =

Tribe of the Early East Slavs

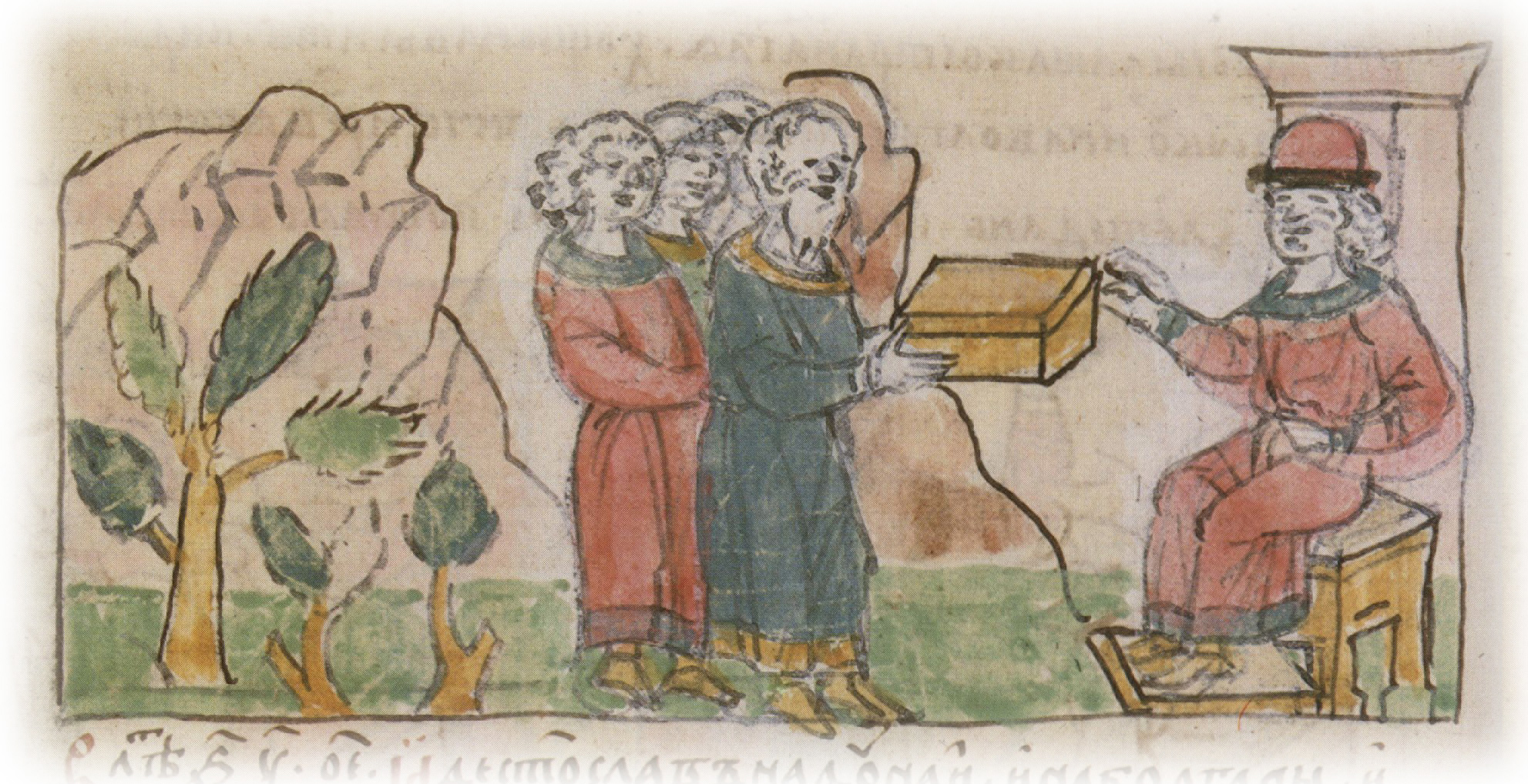
The Vyatichi tribes pay tribute to Prince Svyatoslav I Igorevich (966). Miniature from the Radziwiłł Letopis, late 15th century.

The Vyatichi, Viatichi (Russian: вя́тичи) or Vyatichs were a tribe of Early East Slavs who inhabited regions around the Oka, Moskva and Don rivers.

The Vyatichi had for a long time no princes, but the social structure was characterized by democracy and self-government. Like various other Slavic tribes, the Vyatichi people built kurgans on territory which belongs now to the modern Russian state. The 12th-century Primary Chronicle recorded that the Vyatichi, Radimichs and Severians "had the same customs", all lived violent lifestyles, "burned their dead and preserved the ashes in urns set upon posts beside the highways", and they did not enter monogamous marriages but practiced polygamy, specifically polygyny, instead. Saint Kuksha of the Kiev Caves was a missionary who converted many Vyatichi to Christianity, but was beheaded by their chiefs (probably in the late summer of 1115).

The Primary Chronicle names a certain tribal leader Vyatko as the forefather of the tribe, who was a Lyakh brother of Radim from whom emerged the Radimichs. The Vyatichi were mainly engaged in farming and cattle-breeding. Between the 9th and 10th centuries, the Vyatichi paid tribute to the Khazars and later to Kievan princes. The tribe, however, was constantly trying to defend its own political independence until the early 12th century.

In the late 10th century, the southern communities of the Vyatichi are thought to have absorbed the remaining Don Slavs. By the 11th century, the Vyatichi had already populated the Moskva basin and the area of today's Moscow. In the 11th and 12th centuries, the tribe had a number of towns due to developing handicrafts and increasing trade, including Moscow, Koltesk, Dedoslav, Nerinsk and others. In the second half of the 12th century the land of the Vyatichi was distributed among the princes of Suzdal and Chernigov. The last direct reference to the Vyatichi was made in a chronicle under the year of 1197. Indirect references, however, may be traced to the early 14th century.

There are numerous archeological monuments in Moscow that tell historians about the Vyatichi. Their fortified settlements of the 11th century were located in the historical center of today's Moscow, namely the Borovitsky Hill, Kolomenskoye (the spot of the former Diakovskoye village), Kuntsevo (a district of Moscow) and others. One may also find traces of Vyatich settlements in Brateyevo, Zyuzino, Alyoshkino, Matveyevskoye and other localities of Moscow. Burial mounds with cremated bodies have been found along the upper reaches of the Oka and Don.

== See also ==
- Bibliography of Russian history
