= Kolochin culture =

Archaeological culture in Eastern Europe

- Geographical range: Ukraine, southeastern Belarus, southwestern Russia
- Period: Iron Age
- Dates: c. 450 – c. 650
- Preceded by: Kiev culture
- Followed by: Volyntsevo culture

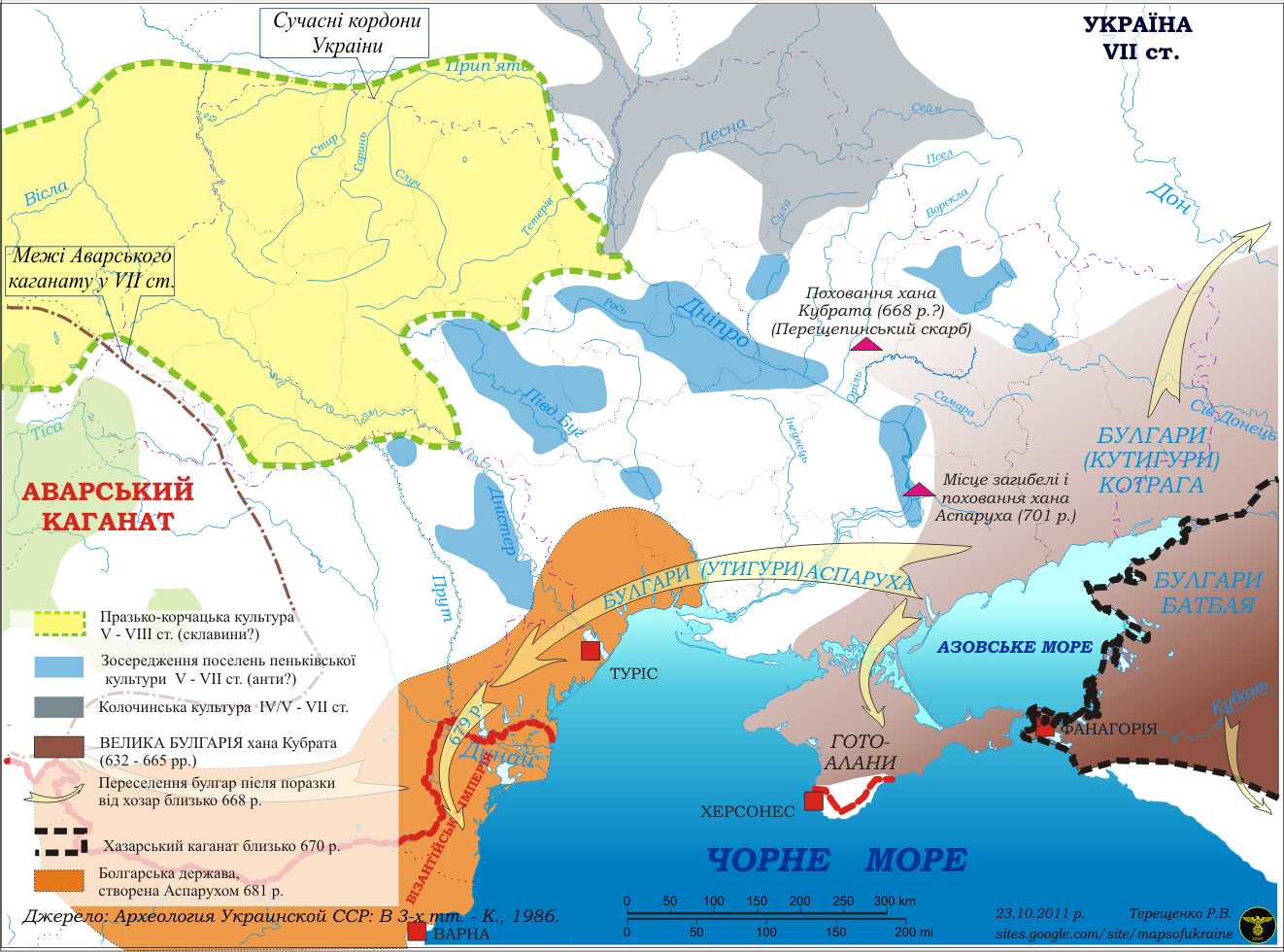
Early medieval archaeological cultures in Ukraine. Kolochin culture (c. 4th–7th century) Penkivka culture (c. 5th–7th century) Prague-Korchak culture (c. 5th–8th century)

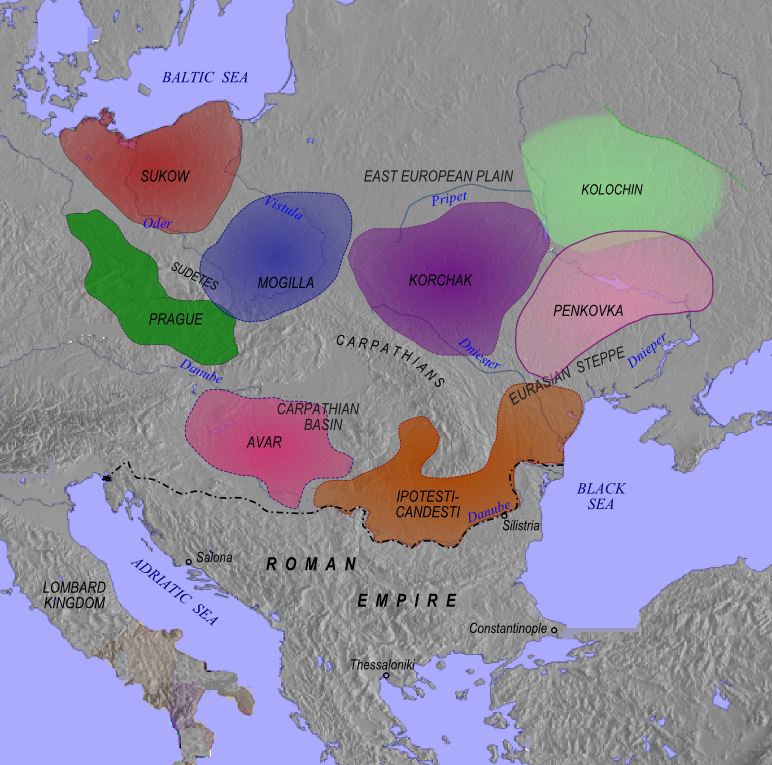
Archaeological cultures in Eastern Europe, 7th century Kolochin culture

The Kolochin culture, also called Kalochyn culture (Belarusian: Калочынская культура, romanized: Kalochynskaya kul'tura), was an Iron Age culture which flourished on the territory of present-day Ukraine (Chernihiv Oblast and Sumy Oblast), southeastern Belarus (Gomel and Mogilev Oblasts) and southwestern Russia (Bryansk and Kursk Oblasts), from the 4th or 5th to the 7th century. It was the northeastern element of the Prague-Penkivka-Kolochin cultural complex.

The Kolochin culture is attested by a hundred sites, most of which are situated along the Dnieper drainage. The archaeological culture was named after one of these, Kalochyn (Kolochin in Russian; Kolochyn in Ukrainian) in the Rechytsa district of Belarus. These settlements were undefended and composed of small single-roomed houses. Burials were by cremation.

The culture has been identified with either Balts and Slavs. The presence of Baltic river names in the area has lent support to the former theory. People living to the south of the Kolochin culture are however believed to have been Slavs. The Kolochin culture appears to have had relations with these Slavs to their south, and this may have been a source for linguistic exchanges between Baltic and Slavic languages. According to Michel Kazanski, due to similarities with Penkivka culture, the population of Kolochin can be associated with the Antes.

== Bibliography ==
- Mallory, J. P.; Adams, Douglas Q. (1997). "Kolochin culture". Encyclopedia of Indo-European Culture. Taylor & Francis. pp. 337–338. ISBN 1884964982.
