= Prague-Korchak culture =

Eastern European archaeological culture

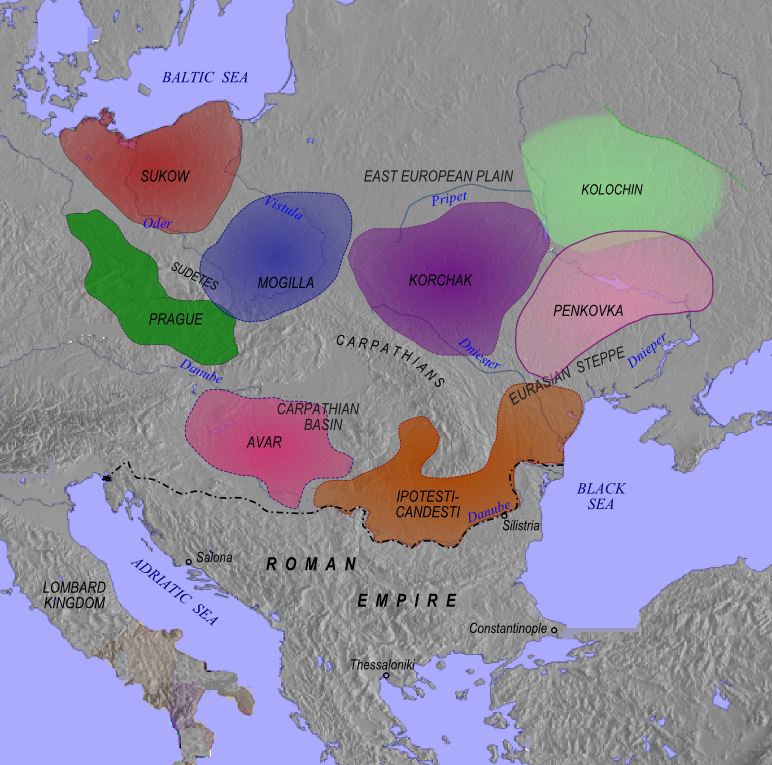
The Prague-Penkov-Kolochin group of archaeological cultures

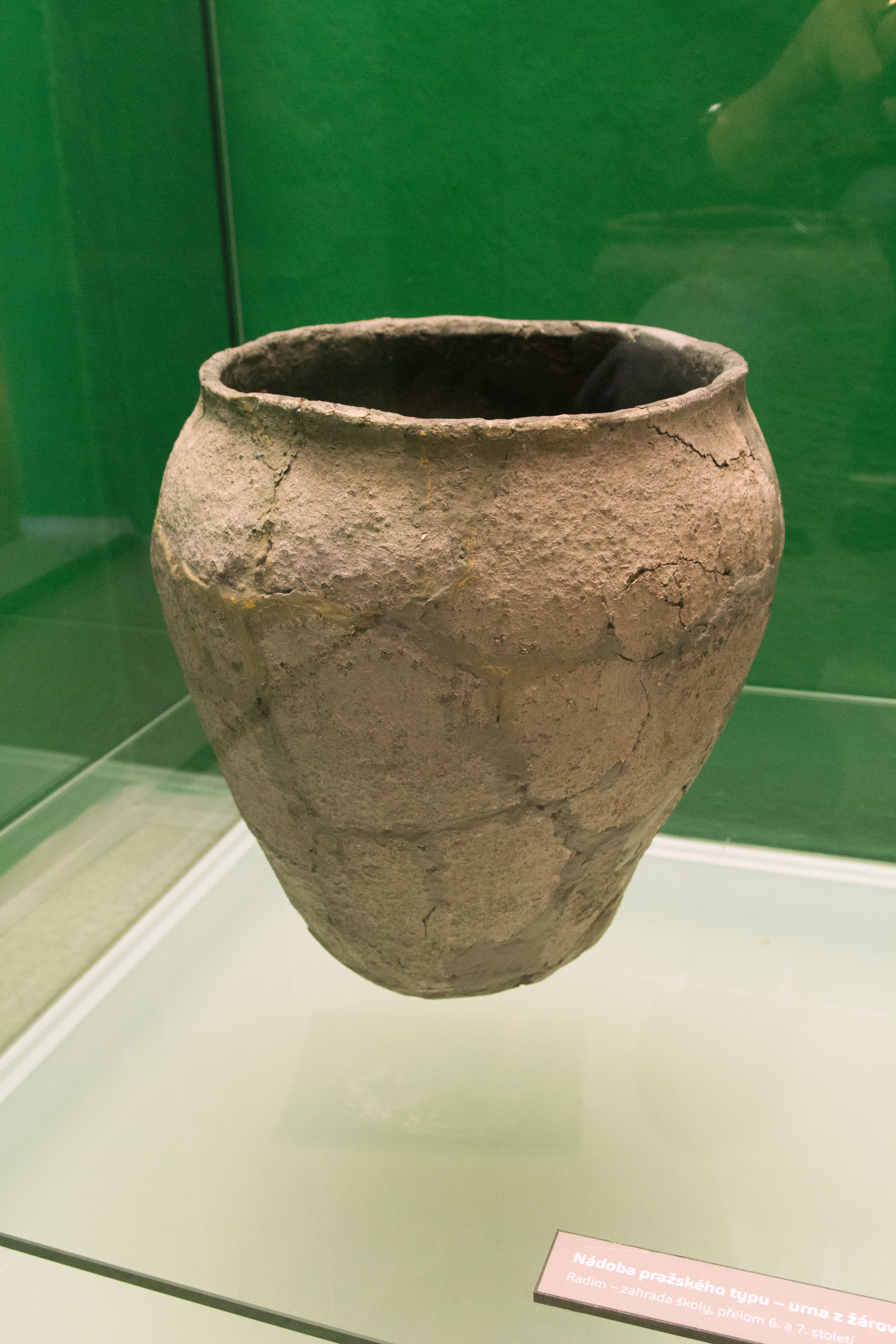
Prague-type pottery

The Prague-Korchak culture was an archaeological culture attributed to the Early Slavs. The other contemporary main Early Slavic culture was the Prague-Penkovka culture situated further south, with which it makes up the "Prague-type pottery" group. The largest part of sites dates to the late 5th and early 6th century AD according to Late Roman iron fibulae. Settlements were as a rule placed at rivers, near water sources, and were typically unfortified, with 8–20 households with courtyards. Burial sites were both flat graves and barrows (kurgans), and cremation was dominant.

Slavic archaeologists including M. Kazanski identified the 6th-century Prague (Prague-Korchak) culture and Sukow-Dziedzice group as Sclaveni archaeological cultures, and the Penkovka culture (Prague-Penkovka) was identified as Antes.

== See also ==
- Korchak culture
- Penkovka culture
- Ipotesti-Candesti culture
- Kolochin culture
- Sukow-Dziedzice group
- Sclaveni
- Antes people
- Early Slavs

== Sources ==
- Cvijanović, Irena (2013). "The Typology of Early Medieval Settlements in Bohemia, Poland and Russia". In Rudić, Srđan (ed.). The World of the Slavs: Studies of the East, West and South Slavs: Civitas, Oppidas, Villas and Archeological Evidence (7th to 11th Centuries AD). Istorijski institut. pp. 289–344. ISBN 978-86-7743-104-4.
- Dolukhanov, Pavel (2014). "The Slavs in Europe". The Early Slavs: Eastern Europe from the Initial Settlement to the Kievan Rus. Routledge. ISBN 978-1-317-89222-9.
- James, Edward (2014). Europe's Barbarians AD 200-600. Routledge. ISBN 978-1-317-86825-5.
