= Radimichs =

Medieval East Slavic tribe

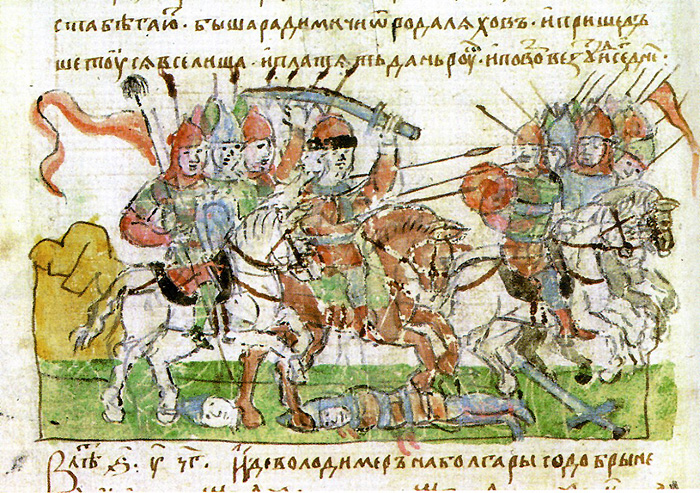
Miniature from the Radziwiłł Chronicle: the victory of Wolf's Tail, the governor of Kyivan Prince Vladimir the Great, over the Radzimichs on the Pischan River in 984

The Radimichs, (Note: Also spelled Radimichi) or Radzimichs (Belarusian: Радзiмiчы, romanized: Radzimičy, Russian: Радимичи, Ukrainian: Радимичі and Polish: Radymicze), were an East Slavic tribe of the last several centuries of the 1st millennium, which inhabited upper east parts of the Dnieper down the Sozh and its tributaries. The name probably derives from the name of the forefather of the tribe – Radim. According to Russian chronicle tradition, "... but there were Radimichs from the Lechites family, who came and settled here and paid tribute to Rus, and the wagon was carried to the present day" (a wagon is a type of tax for the right to have one's own prince). However, in the scientific literature, there is no consensus on the ethnicity of the Radimichs. Archaeological evidence indicates that this tribal association had a mixed Slavic-Baltic origin.

The Radimichs lived in the interfluve of the upper Dnieper and Desna rivers along the Sozh and its tributaries (the south of Vitebsk, the east of the Mogilev and Gomel regions of modern Belarus, the west of the Bryansk and south-west of the Smolensk regions of modern Russia. Written evidence on Radimichi falls on the period from 885 to 1169.

== History ==
The lands of the Radimichs were conveniently connected with the central regions of the Kievan Rus by waterway. In the 11th and 12th centuries, the Radimichs had a few known cities: Gomey (today's Homel) and Chechersk on the Sozh river, Vshchizh on the Desna River, Vorobyin, Ropeysk, Starodub, and others. Seven-beam temporal jewelry made of bronze or silver represent a specific ethnic trait of the Radimichs of the 9th–11th centuries.

There is little information on the Radimichs. According to Nestor the Chronicler, the tribe of Radimichs "sprang from the Lyakhs" or after the conquest by Vladimir the Great became part of the race of Lyakhs (Lendians) and used to live in areas of Sozh river. According to tradition recorded by Nestor, their name derives from the name of the forefather of the tribe, Radim, who was one of the Lyakh brothers, other being Vyatko from whom emerged Vyatichi.

Historians know that in the middle of the 9th century they were paying tribute to the Khazars. In 885, the Radimichs were conquered by Prince Oleg of Novgorod and became part of Kievan Rus. In 907, the Radimichs are mentioned as a part of Oleg's army in his military campaign against Byzantine Empire. In 984, the Radimichs tried to break away from the Kievan Rus, but were defeated on the Pischan River by Vladimir the Great's commander Volchiy Khvost ("Wolf's Tail"). Since then, there had been no mentioning of the tribe in the chronicles. They continued living on their land, gradually assimilating with neighboring tribes and peoples and forming the Belarusian nationality. Subsequently, the lands of the Radimichs became a part of the Chernigov and Smolensk principalities.

In the Primary Chronicle, it is recorded that the Radimichs, Vyatichi, and Severians "had the same customs", all lived violent lifestyles, "burned their dead and preserved the ashes in urns set upon posts beside the highways", and they did not enter monogamous marriages but practiced polygamy, specifically polygyny, instead.

The Radimichs were last mentioned in a chronicle in 1169.

== Origin ==
The Tale of Bygone Years tells about the Lechites origin of the Radimichi: “...radimichi bo... from the Lechites” and “The former Radimichi from the Lechites family; before that, you are all-powerful, and pay tribute to Russia ”. These words of the chronicler had a great influence on many researchers. Medieval Polish chroniclers - Jan Długosz, Maciej Stryjkowski and others, as well as historians of the 18th and 19th centuries unconditionally recognized the Polish origin of the Radimichi.

Aleksey Shakhmatov tried to support the annalistic report about the Lechites origin of the Radimichi with linguistic data, referring to the fact that the Radimichi region now belongs to the territory of Belarusian language, in which there are many coincidences with the Polish.

However Yefim Karsky spoke out against the theory of the Lechites origin of the Radimichi, showing the independent development of those features of the Belarusian language that bring it closer to the Polish. According to Karsky, the chronicle of the Lyash origin of the Radimichi does not indicate that they were a Lyash tribe, but that they moved to Sozh from more western regions, where they neighbored with the Lyash tribes. This opinion was also supported by Lubor Niederle, who considered the basins of Bug and Nareva.

Repeated attempts were made to determine the area from which the Radimichi came to Sozh by mapping toponyms with the base rad-. However, such toponyms, apparently, come from anthroponym Radim, distributed over a much larger territory than the defined regions.

On the basis of hydronymics data, it was possible to establish some similarity between the hydronyms of Sozh area and the hydronyms of a small section of the Upper Dniester region that, according to some historians, is the area from which the Radimichi moved to the Sozh basin.

The connection between the Radimichi and the pre-Radimichi population of Sozh area, observed both in objects of material culture and in rites, suggests that the newcomer Slavs felt the influence of the Baltic population here. It is also possible to make an assumption about the small number of alien Slavs.

Vyacheslav Ivanov and Vladimir Toporov compared the basis of the ethnonym Radimichi with the Iranian Scythian stem radam- from the Iranian fratama- < *pratama- "first", used in the Scythian royal names (' Radam-furt-, Radam-sad-, Radam-as-, Radam-mizda-, etc.). Georgy Vernadsky derived the name radimichi from Iron Ossetic: rad – "order", "line", Iron Ossetic: radomun, radĕmun - "to subdue", "to conquer". Georgy Khaburgaev, believed that the term "radimichi" was formed from the historically earlier name of the Baltic ethnic community, which was Slavicized by the 9th-10th centuries.

The chronicle tells about the origin of the Radimichi from the legendary person Radima: “... Radimichi Bo and Vyatichi from the Poles. For 2 brothers in laces, Radim, and the other Vyatko, and the gray-haired Radim came to Szhya, and was called Radimichi ... ”. Some modern authors believe that this legend reflects the biblical worldview of the author rather than a real historical fact.

== See also ==
- List of Medieval Slavic tribes
- Bibliography of Russian history
