= Michel Kazanski =

French archaeologist (born 1953)

- Born: 24 March 1953 (age 73); Riga, Soviet Union

Academic work
- Discipline: Archaeologist
- Institutions: Collège de France; French National Centre for Scientific Research

Michel Kazanski (born 24 March 1953) is a French archaeologist who is the director of research at the Center for Byzantine History and Civilization of the Collège de France and the French National Centre for Scientific Research.

== Biography ==
Michel Kazanski was born in Riga, then part of the Soviet Union, on 24 March 1953. He was educated at Saint Petersburg State University, the Russian Academy of Sciences and the University of Paris. Since 2008, Kazanski has been the director of research at the Center for Byzantine History and Civilization of the Collège de France and the French National Centre for Scientific Research. Kazanski specializes in the archaeology of the Byzantine Empire and the "barbarian" peoples of the migration period. He is the author of hundreds of scientific articles and dozens of books and monographs on these subjects.

== Selected works ==
- Les Goths, 1991
- L'armée romaine et les barbares, 1993
- La Noblesse romaine et les chefs barbares du IIIe au VIIe siècle, 1995
- Les Slaves, 1999
- (edited; with Vanessa Soupault) Les sites archéologiques en Crimée et au Caucase durant l'antiquité tardive et le haut Moyen-Age, 2000
- (edited; with A. Nercessian & Constantin Zuckerman) Les centres proto-urbains russes entre Scandinavie, Byzance et Orient, 2000
- La nécropole gallo-romaine et mérovingienne de Breny (Aisne), 2002
- (with Anna Mastykova) Les peuples du Caucase du Nord, 2003
- Des les Goths aux Huns, 2006
- (edited; with Vujadin Ivanisevic & Anna Mastykova) Les nécropoles de Viminacium à l'époque des grandes migrations, 2006
- (edited; with Xavier Delestre & Patrick Périn), De l'Age du fer au haut Moyen Age: Archéologie funéraire, princes et élites guerrières, 2006
- Los antiguos eslavos: Orígenes y migraciones, 2021
