= Polans (eastern) =

Ethnic group

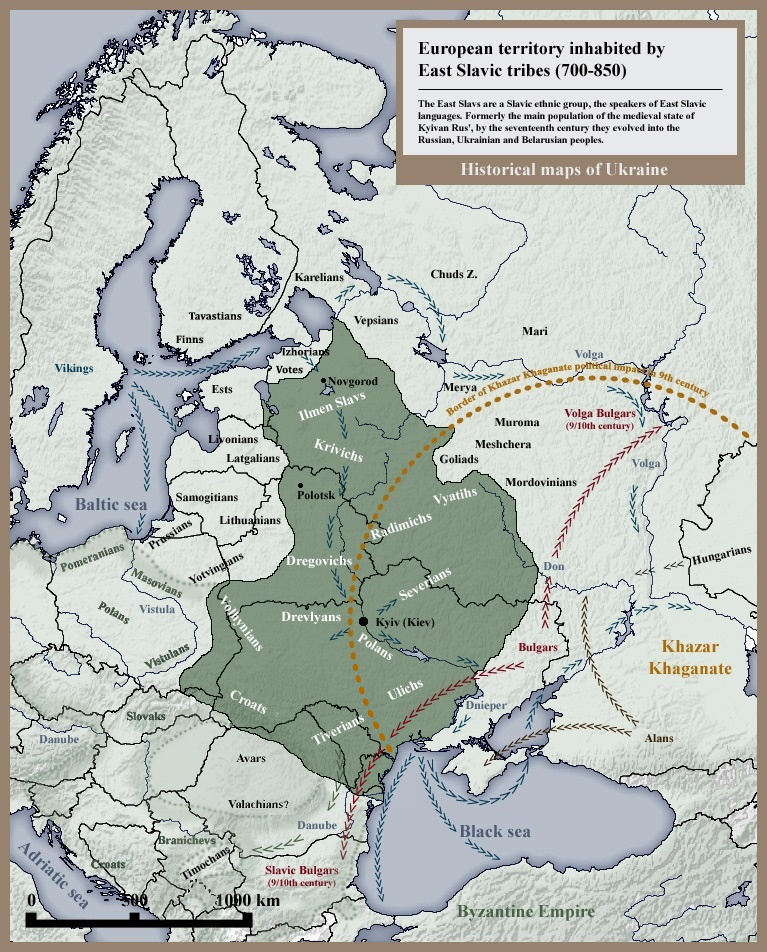
European territory inhabited by East Slavic tribes in the 8th and 9th centuries.

The Polans or Polians (Ukrainian: Поляни, romanized: Poliany; Russian: Поляне, romanized: Polyane; Polish: Polanie; Old East Slavic: Полѧне, romanized: Polyąne), also known as Polanians, Polianians, and Eastern Polans, were an East Slavic tribe between the 6th and the 9th century, which inhabited both sides of the Dnieper river from Liubech to Rodnia and also down the lower streams of the rivers Ros', Sula, Stuhna, Teteriv, Irpin', Desna and Pripyat.

The distinct western Polans of the Early Middle Ages were a West Slavic tribe, ancestors of the Poles.

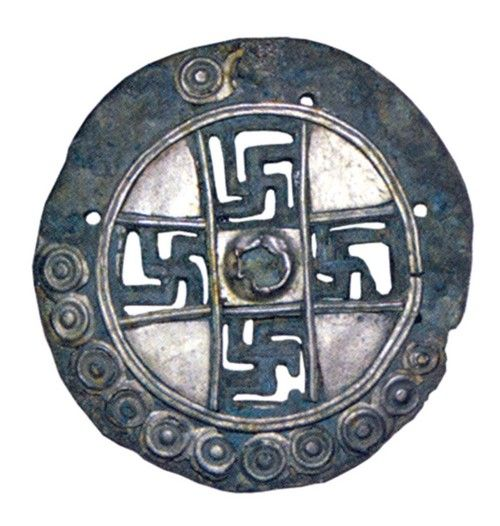
Fibula of Eastern Polans (2nd - 3rd-century). Slavic settlement near the village Taymanava district in Mogilev, Belarus.

== History ==
The name derives from the Old East Slavic word поле (romanized: pole), which means "field", because, according to the Primary Chronicle they lived in the fields (занеже в поле седяху). At one stage the Polanians were subjugated by the Khazars.

The land of the Polans was at the crossroads of important trade and territories inhabited by different Eastern Slavic tribes (such as the Drevlians, Radimichs, Drehovians and Severians) and connected them all with water arteries. An important trade route, the Road from the Varangians to the Greeks, passed along the Dnieper through the land of the Polans and connected Northern Europe with the Black Sea and the Byzantine Empire. Geographic location of the Polans allowed them to play an organisational role in consolidation of the East Slavic tribes. In the 9th and 10th centuries the Polans conducted well-developed arable land farming, cattle-breeding, hunting, fishing, wild-hive beekeeping and various handicrafts such as blacksmithing, casting, pottery, goldsmithing, etc. Thousands of (pre-Polan) kurgans, found by archaeologists in the Polan region, indicate that that land could support a relatively high population density. The Polans lived in small families in semi dug-outs ("earth-houses") and wore homespun clothes and modest jewellery. Before converting to Christianity, the inhabitants used to burn their dead and to erect kurgan-like embankments over them.

In the 860s, the Varangians (Vikings) arrived and organized a few successful military campaigns against the Byzantine Empire, which eventually defeated them and made peace with them, the Pechenegs and the Polochans. From 9th century Polans began to be known as Rus', and the region they inhabited as Rus' land, a name they presumably adopted from Varangians.

The chronicles repeatedly note that socio-economic relations in the Polan communities were highly developed compared to the neighboring tribes. According to the Primary Chronicle, the Polan tribe was headed by three brothers - Kyi, Shchek and Khoryv, who laid the foundation of Kyiv, which will become a tribal centre. Two Varangians Askold and Dir are considered to be the first rulers of Kiev. In the 880s Oleg the Wise conquered the land of the Polans, from this point the territory they inhabited becomes the political, cultural and economic centre of Kievan Rus'.

According to chronicalized legends, the largest cities of the eastern Polans were Kyiv, Pereiaslav, Rodnia, Vyshhorod, Bilhorod Kyivskyi (now Bilohorodka village at the Irpin river) and Kaniv. In the 10th century, the term "Polans" was virtually out of use, replaced by the name "Rus", with eastern Polans as a tribe being last mentioned in a chronicle of 944.

== See also ==
- Lech, Czech and Rus
- Drevlians
- Severians
- List of Medieval Slavic tribes
- Bibliography of Russian history
