= Praedenecenti =

Slavic tribe

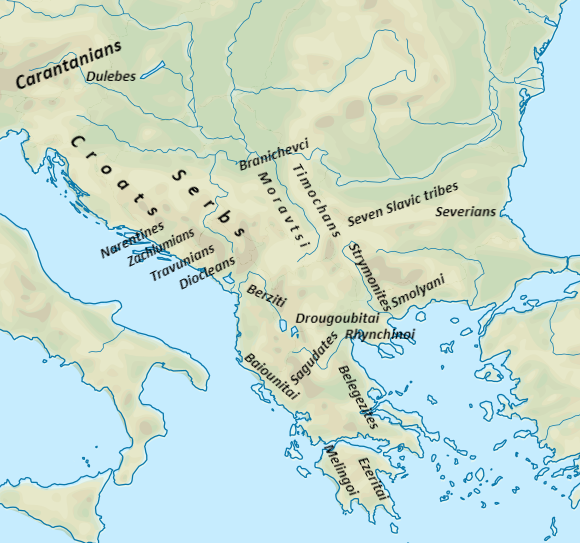
Early medieval Slavic tribes in Southeastern Europe

Praedenecenti, also known as the Danubian Abodrites or Obotrites, were an early medieval Slavic tribe, that lived in the Great Danubian plain, to the east of the river Danube, in the buffer zone between the Carolingian and Bulgarian empires. They were mentioned in the Royal Frankish Annals, regarding the events in 822 and 824, that preceded Bulgarian intrusions into Frankish Pannonia (827-828). In 822, they sent envoys to emperor Louis the Pious, and in 824 they sought assistance from the Franks against the Bulgars. Contemporary Bavarian Geographer from the 9th century listed various Slavic tribes, and among them two similarly named groups: the Northern Abodrites (Nortabtrezi, the well known Polabian Abodrites) and the Eastern Abodrites (Ostabtrezi / Osterabtrezi, the Danubian Abodrites of the Royal Frankish Annals). Since the Royal Frankish Annals explicitly state that Abodrites are also called Praedenecenti, and the list of Bavarian Geographer makes a distinction between Northern and Eastern Abodrites, various scholars have concluded that Praedenecenti, or Eastern Abodrites were a Danubian branch of the Polabian Abodrites, while some other scholars are also connecting them to other Slavic tribes, especially the Braničevci or Merehani, and thus the question of their identification is still under dispute.

== Sources ==
The Praedenecenti was an "enigmatic" tribe living near the Middle Danube frontier of the Carolingian Empire in the 820s. The Royal Frankish Annals mentioned them twice (under the years 822 and 824), but no other written primary source referred to them. Since the Royal Frankish Annals apparently associated them with the Abodriti (a Slavic tribe near the Baltic Sea), Vasil Gyuzelev equates them with the "Ostabtrezi" or "Osterabtrezi" (Eastern Abodriti), whom the Bavarian Geographer listed among the tribes living along the eastern borders of the Carolingian Empire.

== Ethnonym and ethnicity ==
The origin of their ethnonym is unclear. Gyuzelev proposes, the Praedenecenti's name derived from an Old Bulgarian expression, pred'n čdi, meaning "the leading/noble family/children". Archaeologist Gábor Vékony also says, the ethnonym is of Slavic origin, but he proposes that it refers to a people on "this bank" of the river Donets. Imre Boba and Pavel Georgiev write, the name is connected the Latin word for spoil (praeda), showing that the inhabitants of the Carolingian Empire regarded the Praedenecenti as plunderers.

The Royal Frankish Annals listed the Praedenecenti among the Slavic peoples. Pavel Jozef Šafárik and Joachim Lelewel associated them with the Braničevci. Based on the similarity of the two ethnonyms, Lubor Niederle also said that the Braničevci and the Praedenecenti were identical. Other scholars have not accepted this identification. Boba identified them as "booty-taking" Moravians in accordance with his alternative theory of the location of Great Moravia. Archaeologist Silviu Oța proposes that they are the same as the Merehani.

== Territory ==
The Praedenecenti inhabited "Dacia on the Danube", according to the Royal Frankish Annals. The same source also mentioned that they were neighbors of the Bulgars. Their prolonged conflicts with the Bulgars and their attempts to seek assistance from the Franks imply that they inhabited a wide region between Bulgaria and the Carolingian Empire.

Most historians associate "Dacia on the Danube" with the Roman province of "Dacia Traiana" to the north of the Danube. They conclude that the Praedenecenti lived in modern Banat (the region between the rivers Tisza and Mureș, and the Lower Danube). Due to the lack of archaeological finds which can certainly be dated to the 9th century, the presence of Praedenecenti in Banat has not been substantiated. Archaeologist Béla Miklós Szőke identifies "Dacia on the Danube" with the ancient province of Dacia Ripensis, to the south of the Danube, saying that the Praedenecenti lived near the Timočani (in present-day Serbia or Bulgaria).

Georgiev emphasizes, the Carolingian chronicles also referred to the land between the Tisza and the Danube when writing of Dacia, thus the Praedenecenti may have also controlled this region. Associating the Praedenecenti with the "Ostabtrezi", he also say that their homeland was a well-fortified region, because the Bavarian Geographer stated that there were "more than 100 fortresses" on the Ostabtrezi's land. He also proposes that the Bavarian Geographer may have referred to the ancient earthworks to the east of the Tisza, which are now known as Devil's Dykes.

== History ==
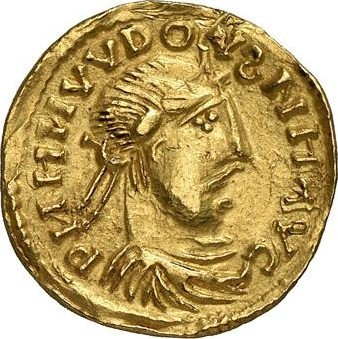
Louis the Pious depicted on one of his coins: he received the envoys of the Praedenecenti in 822 and 824

Avars and other peoples from the Eurasian steppes who were subjected to them inhabited the wider region of the Tisza river till the end of the 8th century. The Avar Khaganate disintegrated due to a series of Frankish campaigns and internal conflicts after 791. The 10th-century Suda encyclopedia states that the Bulgars also inflicted defeats on the Avars in the early 9th century. An Avar dignitary, the kapkhan, went to the Carolingian Empire in early 805, asking Charlemagne to grant a territory to his people, because they "could not stay in their previous dwelling places on account of the attacks of the Slavs", according to the Royal Frankis Annals. The report shows that new power centers, led by Slavic warlords, emerged along the Middle Danube shortly after the collapse of the khaganate.

According to a scholarly theory, the Praedenecenti were Abodrites who moved to the Carpathian Basin at an unspecified time. Their envoys' visit in the Carolingian Empire was recorded for the first time under the year 822. The envoys attended the general assembly that Emperor Louis the Pious held at Frankfurt in autumn. They gave presents to him, along with the delegates of other Slavic tribes and the Avars.

At Frankfurt [Louis the Pious] convoked a general assembly, and with the magnates whom he had ordered to appear there he took care, as usual, of all that pertained to the welfare of the eastern parts of his kingdom. At this assembly he received embassies and presents from all the East Slavs, (Note: The words translated as "from all the East Slavs" here are omnium orientalium Sclavorum in the original Latin, which literally means "all the Slavs from the East", and referred to "envoys of various Slavic peoples from the eastern Frankish border". orientalium thus referred to "the eastern regions of his kingdom" in the previous sentence.) that is the [Abodriti], Sorbs, Wilzi, Bohemians, Moravians, and Praedenecenti, and from the Avars living in Pannonia.

— Royal Frankish Annals (year 822).

Their envoys returned to the empire in 824. They came to Aachen to seek the emperor's assistance against the Bulgars. The Bulgars had already sent delegates to the emperor, but Louis the Pious did not receive them, because he had been informed of the arrival of the envoys of the Praedecenti. After meeting with the Praedenecenti, the emperor ordered them to return to their homeland and come back when he would receive the Bulgar envoys. Historian Charles R. Bowlus assumes, Louis the Pious "wanted to confront the Bulgars with the accusations" of the Praedenecenti.

[Louis the Pious] also received the envoys of the [Abodriti] who are commonly called Praedenecenti and live in Dacia on the Danube as neighbors of the Bulgars, of whose arrival he had been informed. When they complained about vicious aggression by the Bulgars and asked for help against them, he told them to go home and to return when the envoys of the Bulgars were to be received.

— Royal Frankish Annals (year 824).

After their envoys' meeting with Louis the Pious in 824, the Praedenecenti were never mentioned. Georgiev says, their envoys were present when the emperor met with the Bulgar delegates in Aachen in May 825. The Bulgars wanted to determine the border between the Carolingian Empire and Bulgaria, but no compromise was reached. The fate of the Praedenecenti is unknown. According to scholarly theories, they were most probably forced to accept the Bulgars' rule, although some of them may have fled to the Carolingian Empire or settled among the Avars who still dwelled in the plains of the Carpathian Basin. The Praedenecenti lost their independence only after 832, according to Georgiev.

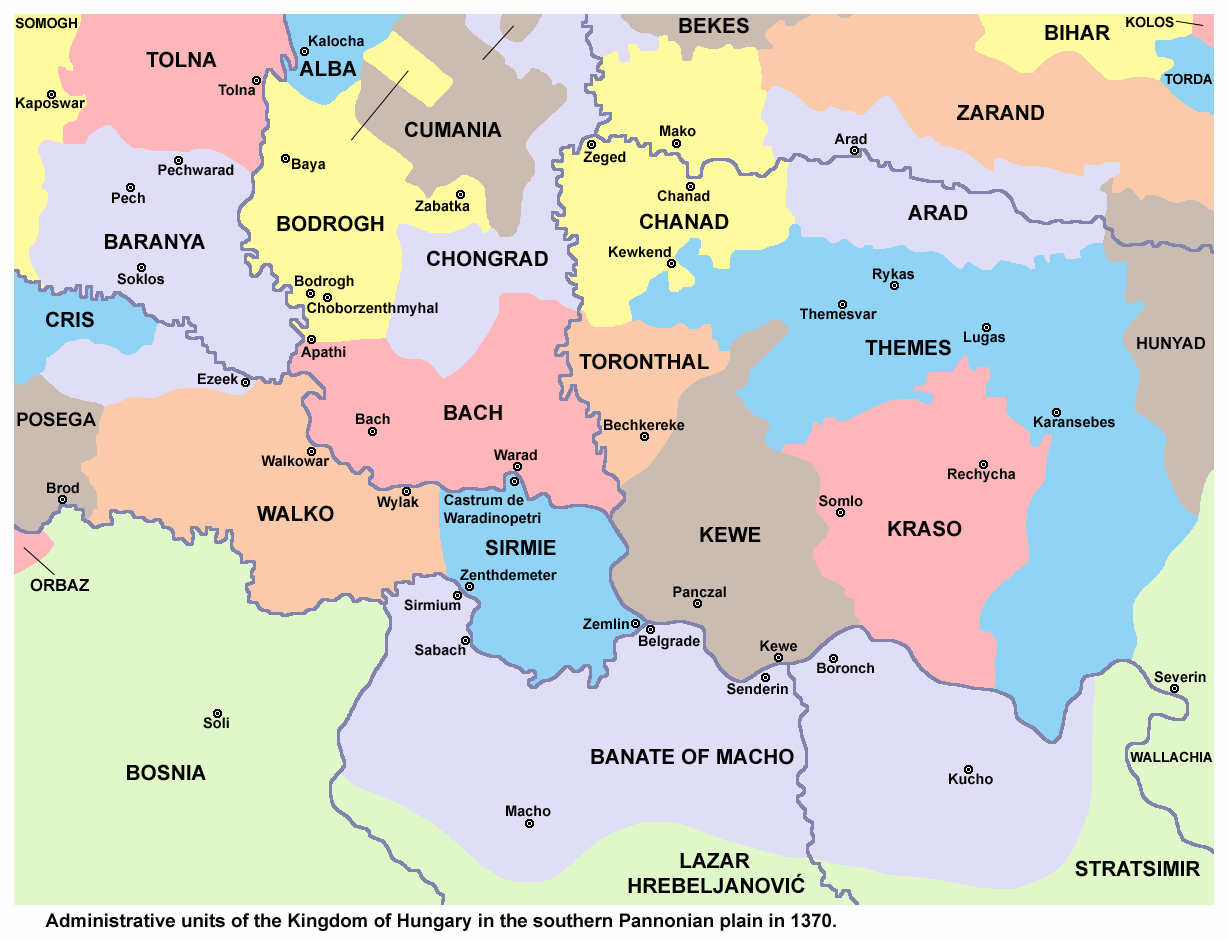
Bodrog county and the Bodrog fortress on the eastern banks of Danube, in the 14th century

After the expansion of Hungarian rule throughout the region, the Bodrog county was established on the eastern banks of the river Danube, neighboring the Bačka county to the south. It was named after the fortress of Bodrog (near modern Sombor, in Serbia). The county existed from the 11th century up to the Ottoman conquest in the first half of the 16th century. A county with the same historical name was briefly reestablished after the liberation from Ottoman rule (1699) and integration of those regions into the Habsburg monarchy, only to be administratively joined with Bačka county (1732), thus forming the united Bács-Bodrog County, that existed until 1918. Some researchers have proposed that names of Bodrog county and fortress stem from the name of Obodrites, who previously inhabited those regions in the 9th century, according to Royal Frankish Annals.

Contrary to that, some other researchers have also proposed that those Obodrites should be located much further to the north-east, on the river Bodrog in the modern Hungarian region of Bodrogköz and neighboring areas in south-east Slovakia.

== See also ==
- Polabian Slavs
- Pannonian Slavs
- History of Bačka
- Bodrog county
- Bodrog (river)
- Bodrog (village)

== Sources ==
Primary sources

- Pertz, Georg Heinrich, ed. (1845). Einhardi Annales. Hannoverae: Impensis Bibliopolii Hahniani.
- Scholz, Bernhard W., ed. (1970). Carolingian Chronicles: Royal Frankish Annals and Nithard's Histories. Ann Arbor, MI: University of Michigan Press.

Secondary sources

- Bowlus, Charles R. (1995). Franks, Moravians, and Magyars: The Struggle for the Middle Danube, 788-907. Philadelphia: University of Pennsylvania Press. ISBN 978-0-8122-3276-9.
- Curta, Florin (2006). Southeastern Europe in the Middle Ages, 500–1250. Cambridge: Cambridge University Press.
- Georgiev, Pavel (2014). "The Abodriti-Praedenecenti between the Tisza and the Danube in the 9th Century" (PDF). Avars, Bulgars and Magyars on the Middle and Lower Danube. Budapest: Archaeolingua Foundation. pp. 107–124. ISBN 978-963-9911-55-0. Archived from the original on 2025-04-25.
- Komatina, Predrag (2010). "The Slavs of the mid-Danube basin and the Bulgarian expansion in the first half of the 9th century" (PDF). Recueil des travaux de l'Institut d'études byzantines. 47: 55–80. doi:10.2298/ZRVI1047055K. hdl:21.15107/rcub_dais_7171. Archived from the original on 9 November 2013.
- Oța, Silviu (2014). The Mortuary Archaeology of the Medieval Banat (10th-14th Centuries). Leiden-Boston: Brill. ISBN 978-90-04-21438-5.
- Pukanec, Martin (2020). The Kiev Leaflets as Folia Glagolitica Zempliniensia. Newcastle upon Tyne: Cambridge Scholars Publishing.
- Szőke, Béla Miklós (2014). The Carolingian Age in the Carpathian Basin: Permanent Exhibition of the Hungarian National Museum (PDF). Budapest: Hungarian National Museum. Archived from the original on 2021-03-29.
