= Drevlians =

Ethnic group

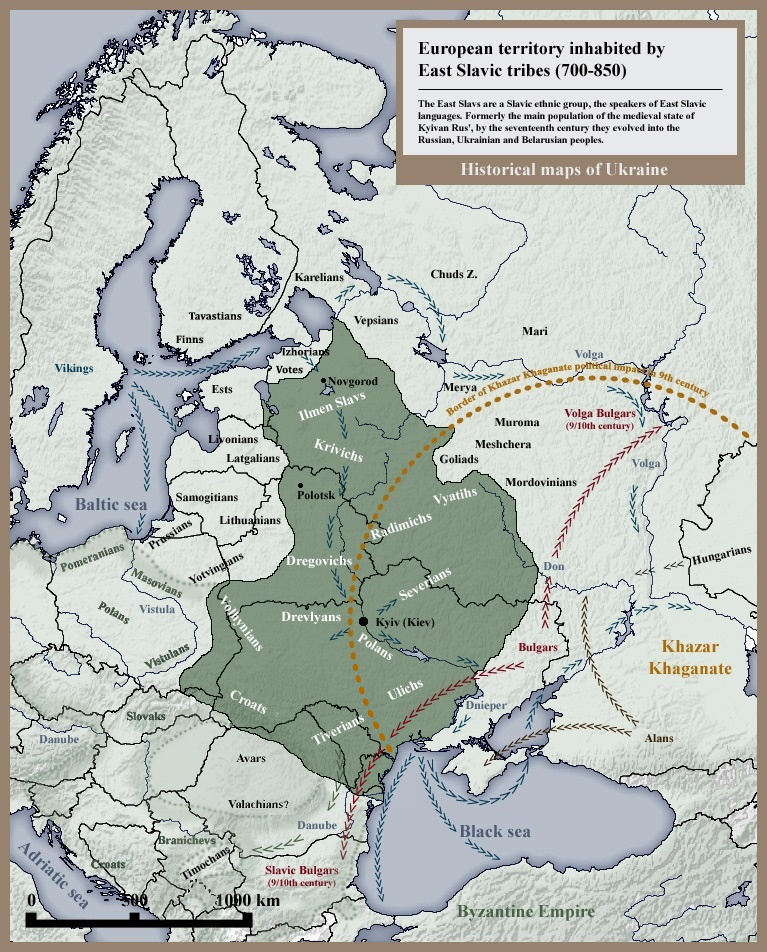
European territory inhabited by East Slavic tribes in 8th and 9th centuries

The Drevlians, Derevlians or Derevlianians (Ukrainian: Деревляни, romanized: Derevliany, Russian: Древля́не, romanized: Drevlyane) were a tribe of East Slavs between the 6th and the 10th centuries, which inhabited the territories of Polesia and right-bank Ukraine, west of the eastern Polans and along the lower reaches of the rivers Teteriv, Uzh, Ubort, and Stsviha. To the west, the Drevlians' territories reached the Sluch River, where the Volhynians (related to the territory of Volhynia) and Buzhans (related to the name of Southern Bug) lived. To the north, the Drevlians' neighbors were the Dregoviches.

== Etymology ==
Their name is derived from Slavic drevo/древо or derevo/дерево, meaning "wood" and "tree", because they lived in the forests. Their name may be rendered "the dwellers in the forest". They possibly were mentioned as Forsderen-Liudi by Bavarian Geographer in the 9th century. The Primary Chronicle (PVL) mentioned that those Slavs who settled in open fields had been called Polyani (after the Slavic pole/поле, meaning "field"), and those in forest areas Drevlyani.

== Settlements ==
The Drevlians left many archaeological traces, such as agricultural settlements with semi-dugouts (or earth-houses), moundless burial grounds and barrows, fortified towns like Vruchiy (present-day Ovruch), Horodske, site of an ancient settlement near Malyn (supposedly, a residence of the Drevlian prince Mal), and others. The principal city of the Drevlians was Iskorosten (today's Korosten), where one can still see a group of compact ancient settlements. After the Kievan Rus' conquered the Drevlians, Iskorosten was burned to the ground and the capital transferred to Ovruch. By the end of the first millennium, the Drevlians already had well-developed farming and handicrafts.

== History ==
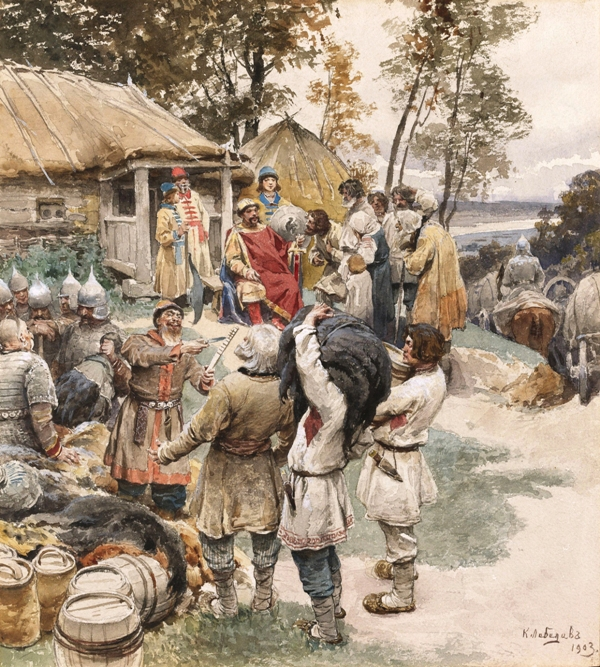
Igor of Kiev Exacting Tribute from the Drevlians, by Klavdiy Lebedev (1852–1916)

The Drevlians initially fervently opposed the Kievan Rus'. According to a number of chronicles, in the times of Kyi, Shchek and Khoryv (supposedly, founders of Kiev), the Drevlians had their own princely rule and were frequently at war with the Polyani. In 883, Prince Oleg of Novgorod made the Drevlians pay tribute to Kiev. In 907, the Drevlians took part in the Kievan military campaign against the Eastern Roman Empire.

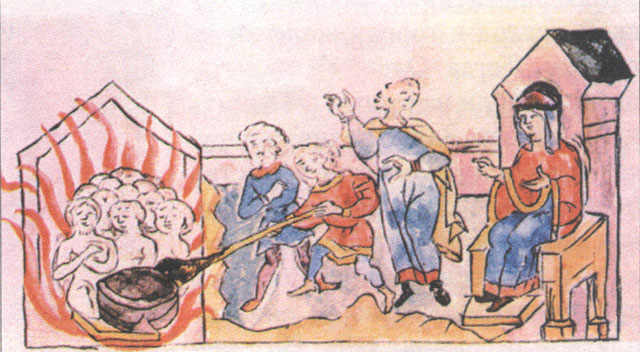
Olga's revenge for the assassination of her husband

After Oleg's death in 912, the Drevlians stopped paying tribute. The Varangian warlord Sveneld made them pay tribute to himself. Oleg's successor Igor attempted to levy the tribute after Sveneld, but the Drevlians revolted and killed him in 945. Igor's widow Olga avenged her husband's death in an extremely harsh manner, killing Drevlian ambassadors and nobility, burning their capital of Iskorosten to the ground, and leveling other towns. After having subjugated the Drevlians, Olga transformed their territories into a Kievan appanage with the center in Vruchiy.

The last contemporary mention of the Drevlians occurred in a chronicle of 1136, when Grand Prince Yaropolk Vladimirovich of Kiev gave their lands to the Church of the Tithes.

== In literature ==
The Drevlians are depicted in works dedicated to Kniaz Igor and Kniaginia Olga, including:

- Leopold von Sacher-Masoch's Bloody Wedding in Kiev, 1866;
- Petro Haivoronskyі's The Kniahynia's Comb, 2015

and also

- Korff, Serge Sergej Alexander (1911), Den drevljanske fursten Mal / S. A. Korff, Skrifter utgivna av Svenska litteratursällskapet i Finland (in Swedish), Helsinki: Society of Swedish Literature in Finland, ISSN 0039-6842, Wikidata Q113396170

== See also ==
- List of early Slavic peoples
- Bibliography of Russian history
