= Tivertsi =

Tribe of early East Slavs

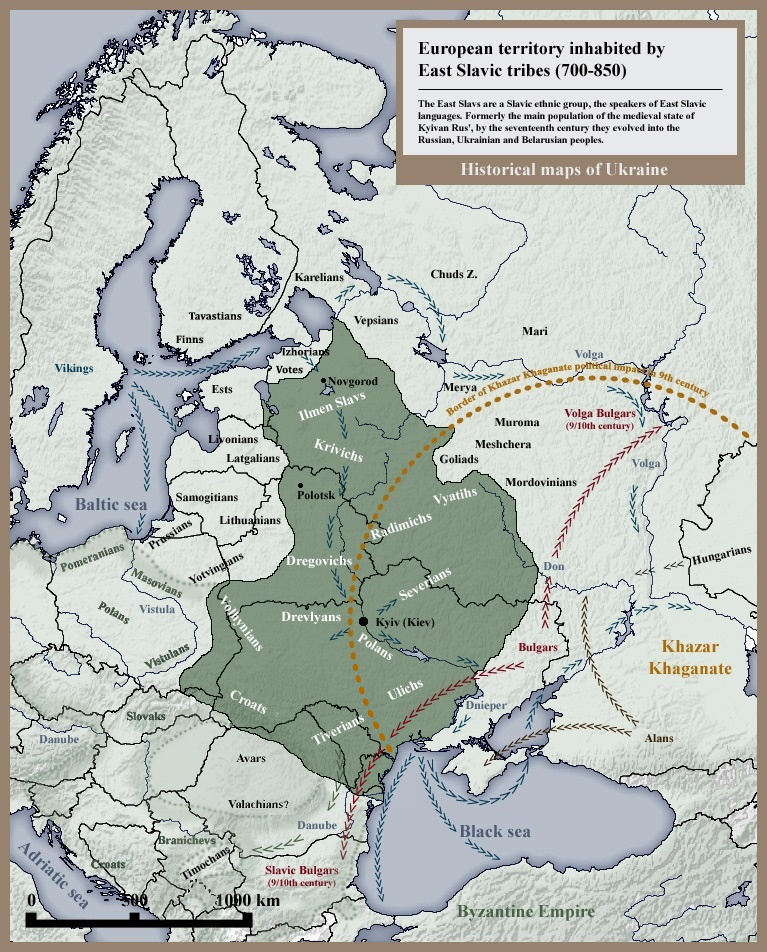
European territory inhabited by East Slavic in 8th and 9th century.

The Tivertsi (Ukrainian: Ти́верці; Russian: Ти́верцы; Romanian: Tiverți or Tiverieni), were a tribe of early East Slavs which lived in the lands near the Dniester, and probably the lower Danube, that is in modern-day western Ukraine and the Republic of Moldova and possibly in eastern Romania and the southern Odesa oblast of Ukraine. The Tivertsi were one of the tribes that formed the Ukrainian ethnicity, namely the sub-ethnic and historic region of Podolia. The Tivertsis' cultural inheritors, the Podolians, are a distinct group of Ukrainians.

== Ethnonym ==
Other spellings include the anglicized form Tivertsians and the Slavic transliterated Tivertsy. George Vernadsky suggests that the name Tivertsi possibly originates from the fortress Turris of Justinian I, pointing out that the letter "u" was commonly rendered as "v" (or, rather, ypsilon), suggesting the common root "tvr" of Iranian origin, meaning "fast". According to another theory is related with Turkic forms tyvar and tavar ("cattle", "property", "riches", "goods"), which is seemingly related with the Slavic *stado ("cluster (group) of cattle"), which supposedly stands in the name of Stadici described by Bavarian Geographer as "countless people" who had 516 settlements, while the neighbour Unlizi (Ulichs) as "populus multus", thus relating the Tivertsi with Stadici "can be interpreted as Turkic – Slavic tracing, serving to designate a large tribe in the southwestern part of present Ukraine." (some also related the White Croats with Stadici), or they could have been mentioned as Attorozi.

== History ==
The original information about the tribe is scarce. Tivertsi and Ulichs are briefly mentioned in early Ruthenian manuscripts, 863 being the earliest reference, 944 being the latest. The Primary Chronicle from the Laurentian Codex (the oldest copy) mentions that they lived by the Dniester and Danube down to the sea (evidently, the Black Sea). The Hypatian Codex (later re-copy) replaces the Dniester with the Dnieper. The Tver Chronicle mentions them in the year 883, mentioning their fight against Askold and Dir. A number of manuscripts mention in the year 885 that they fought with Oleg of Novgorod. They are mentioned as taking part in Oleg's expeditions in 907 and in Igor's expeditions in 944, the latter year being the last reference to Tivertsi in early East Slavic manuscripts.

At the beginning of the 10th century, the tribe became part of the Kievan Rus. Starting in the mid-10th century, the Tivertsi frequently fought against the neighbouring Pechenegs and Cumans. In 12th and 13th centuries, some lands of the Tivertsi were part of the Kingdom of Galicia and later the Grand Duchy of Lithuania.

== Settlements ==
Several settlements of Tivertsi are now archaeological sites in Ukraine and Republic of Moldova (Alcedar, Echimăuţi, Rudi and others). According to Romanian and Moldovan researchers, Tivertsi were a Romanic-Slavic population dwelling along the Dniester river.

Some scholars agree that the name of the town of Tyvriv (on the right bank of Southern Buh river) in Ukraine´s Vinnytsia oblast stems from the tribe of Tivertsi, who lived in that very area. Likewise, the name of west Ukraine's town of Kivertsi is also associated with this tribe. It is also presumed that Kamyanets-Podilsky on the Dniester was the tribal center of Tyvertsi.

== See also ==
- List of early Slavic peoples
- Bibliography of Russian history
