= Bethenici =

West Slavic people living east of the Elbe river

The Bethenici (also Bethenzi or Bechelenzi) were a West Slavic people living east of the Elbe river in the ninth century. They lived near the confluence of the Elbe and the Havel, probably between the rivers alongside the Smeldingi.

In 811, according to the Chronicle of Moissac, the Frankish emperor Charlemagne dispatched an army of Franks and Saxons across the Elbe against "those Slavs, who are called Linai and Bechelenzi." The Linai, as Linones, are also mentioned in the Royal Frankish Annals for 811. The Annals of Aniane, which are related to the Chronicle of Moissac, use the spelling Bethenzi. Other variations that appear in the manuscripts are Bethenzr and Bethelclereri. The Chronicle of Moissac and its variants are the only Frankish annals to mention the Bethenici.

The Bethenici are mentioned in the Catalogue of Fortresses and Regions to the North of the Danube, which was produced at the court of the Frankish king Louis the German between 844 and 862. They are grouped with the Smeldingi and Morizani and the three are said to have eleven fortresses between them. The Linones are said to live to their north. To their south lived the Hevelles.

Writing over a century later, Thietmar of Merseburg says that the Kuckenburgers, a certain class of "citizen warriors" in Meissen under Margrave Gunzelin of Kuckenburg, were called Vethenici in Slavonic. This may indicate that the name was never that of a people, but of a class of warriors.

== Bibliography ==
- Goldberg, Eric J. (2006). Struggle for Empire: Kingship and Conflict under Louis the German, 817–876. Cornell University Press.
- Howorth, H. H. (1880). "The Spread of the Slaves, Part III: The Northern Serbs or Sorabians and the Obodriti". The Journal of the Anthropological Institute of Great Britain and Ireland. 9: 181–232. doi:10.2307/2841974. JSTOR 2841974.
- Kats, J. M. J. G.; Claszen, D. (2012). Chronicon Moissiacense Maius: A Carolingian World Chronicle From Creation until the First Years of Louis the Pious (MA thesis). Leiden University.
- Minois, Georges (2014). Charlemagne. Perrin.
- Rossignol, Sébastien (2019). "The Entry of Early Medieval Slavs into World History: The Chronicle of Moissac". In Balázs Nagy; Felicitas Schmieder; András Vadas (eds.). The Medieval Networks in East Central Europe: Commerce, Contacts, Communication. Routledge. pp. 43–57.
- Stone, Gerald (2016). Slav Outposts in Central European History: The Wends, Sorbs and Kashubs. Bloomsbury Academic.
