= Merehani =

The Merehani was a Slavic tribe mentioned by the Bavarian Geographer. They are often connected to the Marharii (Moravians), although some scholars believe that the tribe was separate.

The 9th-century Catalogue of Fortresses and Regions to the North of the Danube – which lists the peoples along the borders of East Francia in a north-to-south order – mentions that the Marharii (Moravians) had 11 fortresses or civitates, and lists the Marharii between the Bohemians and the Bulgars. The same document and also makes mention of the Merehani and their 30 fortresses, listing them after the Bulgars.

In the source, those data are recorded as:

Est populus quem vocant Merehanos, ipsi habent civitates XXX. Iste sunt regiones, que terminant in finibus nostris.

According to Havlík, who writes that the source in question is a consolidated version of notes made by several authors in different years, the Moravians are twice mentioned in the text: first as Marharii, and next as Merehani. He says, that the reference to the Marharii and their 11 fortresses was made between 817 and 843, and the note of the Merehani shows the actual state under Svatopluk I.

In contrast with Havlík, Steinhübel together with Třeštík and Vlasto identify the Merehani with the inhabitants of the Principality of Nitra.

A third view is presented by Püspöki-Nagy and Senga, who write that the reference to the Merehani and their 30 fortresses designates a tribe that was inhabiting the southern regions of the Great Hungarian Plains along the Danube, neighboring the territories dominated by the Bulgars, thus showing the existence of another "Moravia" in Central Europe.

According to Komatina, Merehani were the Balkan Moravians, who lived in valleys of the Morava river basin in present-day Serbia, and were still free at the beginning of the 9th century, but later fell under the Bulgar rule, sometime around 845, when the Bulgars added Slavic Merehani to their societas, being last mentioned in 853.

== Sources ==
- Barford, P. M. (2001). The Early Slavs: Culture and Society in Early Medieval Eastern Europe. Cornell University Press. ISBN 0-8014-3977-9.
- Bowlus, Charles R. (1995). Franks, Moravians, and Magyars: The Struggle for the Middle Danube, 788-907. Philadelphia: University of Pennsylvania Press.
- Goldberg, Eric J. (2006). Struggle for Empire: Kingship and Conflict under Louis the German, 817-876. Ithaca, NY: Cornell University Press.
- Havlík, Lubomír E. (2013). Kronika o Velké Moravě [=Chronicle of Great Moravia]. Jota. ISBN 80-85617-04-8.
- Püspöki-Nagy, Péter (1978). "Nagymorávia fekvéséről [=On the location of Great Moravia]". Valóság. XXI (11). Tudományos Ismeretterjesztő Társulat: 60–82.
- Komatina, Predrag (2010). "The Slavs of the mid-Danube basin and the Bulgarian expansion in the first half of the 9th century" (PDF). Зборник радова Византолошког института. 47: 55–82. Archived from the original on 2026-04-05.
- Komatina, Predrag (2015). "The Church in Serbia at the Time of Cyrilo-Methodian Mission in Moravia" (PDF). Cyril and Methodius: Byzantium and the World of the Slavs. Thessaloniki: Dimos. pp. 711–718. Archived from the original on 2024-09-08.
- Komatina, Predrag (2016). "Military, Administrative and Religious Strongholds on the Danubian Frontier: The Example of Morava and Braničevo" (PDF). Processes of Byzantinisation and Serbian Archaeology. Belgrade: Institute for Byzantine Studie. pp. 103–107. Archived from the original on 2024-09-11.
- Senga, Toru (1983). "Morávia bukása és a honfoglaló magyarok [=The fall of Moravia and the Hungarians occupying the Carpathian Basin]". Századok (2). Magyar Történelmi Társulat: 307–345.
- Steinhübel, Ján (2011). Kapitoly z najstarších dejín českých 531–1004 [=Chapters from the oldest Czech history 531–1004]. Spolok Slovákov v Poľsku – Towarzystwo Słowakow w Polsce. ISBN 978-83-7490-370-7.
- Třeštík, Dušan (2010). Vznik Velké Moravy. Moravané, Čechové a štřední Evropa v letech 791–871 [The Formation of Great Moravia. Moravians, Czechs and Central Europe in the years 791-871]. Nakladatelství lidové noviny. ISBN 978-80-7422-049-4.
- Vlasto, A. P. (1970). The Entry of the Slavs into Christendom: An Introduction to the Medieval History of the Slavs. Cambridge University Press. ISBN 978-0-521-10758-7.
