= Moratsi =

Medieval Slavic Tribe

The Moratsi (Bulgarian: мораци) or, alternatively, Marvatsi or Marvaks (Bulgarian: мърваци) were a minor Slavic tribe that settled in the Western Rhodopes and the middle valley of the Mesta River, possibly in the 7th-8th century.

== History ==
Bulgarian suzerainty over the region was established by khan Presian in 837, when a military campaign led by his kavkhan Isbul gave Bulgaria control over most of Macedonia and the Rhodopes.

By the early 19th century, the Moratsi had transofrmed into a Bulgarian ethnographic group known under the name of Marvatsi (Marvaks), who lived around Melnik and Nevrokop in present-day Bulgaria and in the mountainous parts of the regions of Serres and Demirhisar in modern Greece.

After Bulgaria lost the Second Balkan War and World War I, most Marvaks moved to Bulgaria. In general, it was only Hellenophile members of the Ecumenical Patriarchate of Constantinople that stayed behind. For example, 11,223 out of 14,778 Bulgarians from the prefecture of Kato Nevrokopi, the main Marvak centre in Greece left for Bulgaria between 1913 and 1928.

== See also ==
- List of Medieval Slavic tribes
