= Novgorod Slavs =

Tribe in the Early Slavs

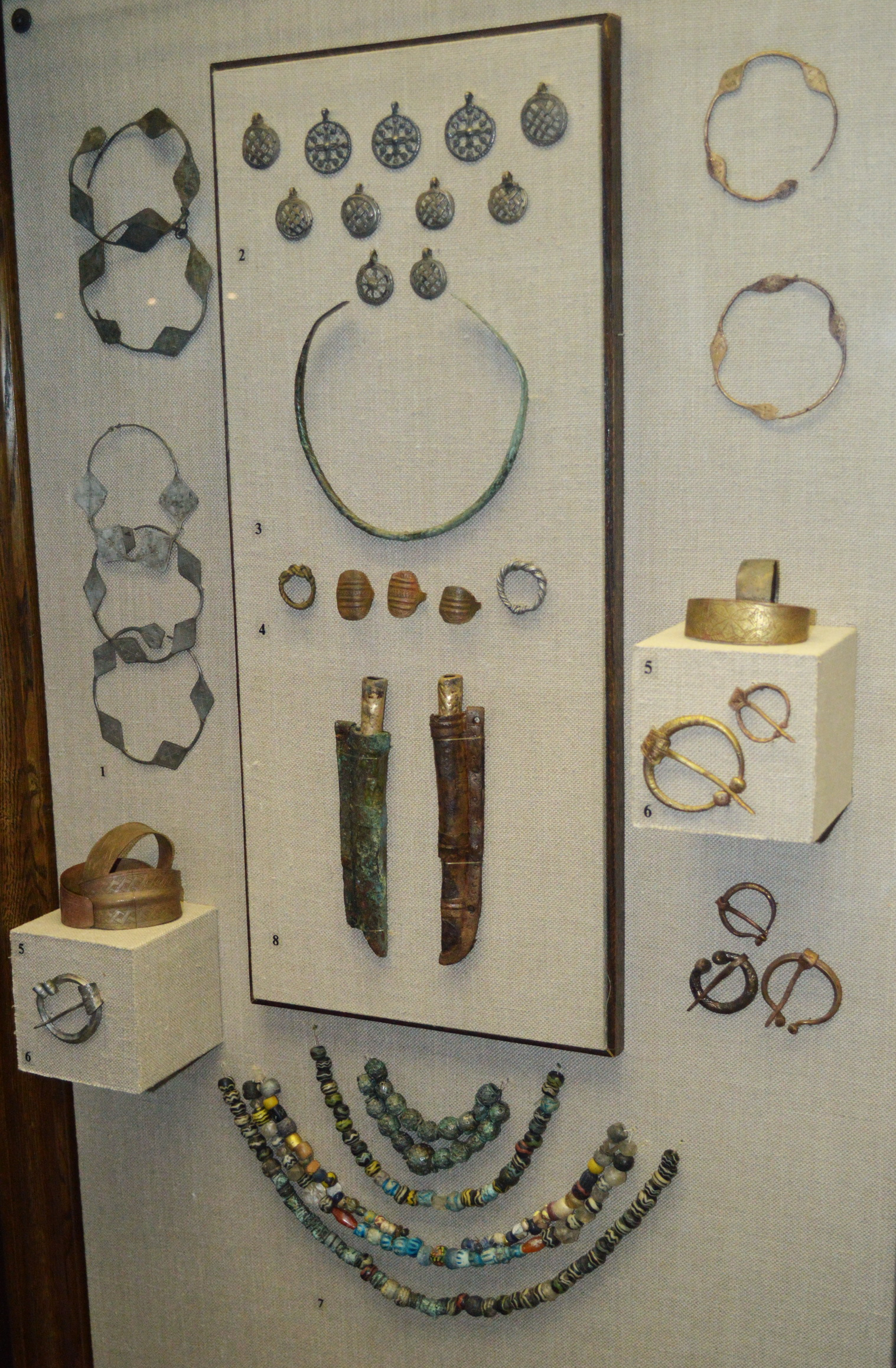
Jewelry of the Novgorod Slovenes

The Novgorod Slavs, Ilmen Slavs (Russian: Ильменские словене, Il'menskiye slovene), or Slovenes were the northernmost tribe of the Early Slavs, and inhabited the shores of Lake Ilmen, and the river basins of the Volkhov, Lovat, Msta, and the upper stream of the Mologa in the 8th to 10th centuries. The Slovenes were native to the region around Novgorod. There is a belief among researchers that Novgorod is one of the regions which were the original home / Urheimat of the Russians and the Slavic tribes.

Like all Eastern Slavs in Russian lands, the Ilmen Slavs had unique characteristics. Ancestors of the Ilmen Slavs who settled in Finnic areas descended from the Severians and the Polabian Slavs, as evidenced by language and traditions (see old Novgorod dialect and Gostomysl for examples). They settled in mostly Finnic areas in Northern Russia, moving along the major waterways, until they met the southward expansion of the Krivich in the modern-day Yaroslavl Oblast.

They left a few archaeological monuments of the 6th–8th centuries, such as agricultural settlements, and tall cone-like kurgans with cremated bodies in the Ladoga region. The most ancient settlement is dated to the 7th or 8th centuries. Numerous archaeological finds, such as a metal tip for a wooden plough, indicate that the Ilmen Slavs had a well-developed agriculture.

They were not a particularly warlike state, but evidence of their unique weaponry, dating back to the mid-8th century, has been found around the city of Novgorod. The weaponry consisted of spears, maces, swords, bows, javelins, and war hammers.

The principal cities of the Ilmen Slavs were Staraya Russa and Novgorod, the center of the Novgorod Republic, which had developed in the 9th–10th centuries.

== See also ==
- List of early Slavic peoples
- Bibliography of Russian history
