= Zeriuani =

Slavic tribe

The Zeriuani or Zeruiani was an unknown Slavic tribe mentioned by the 9th-century Bavarian Geographer (BG). It states that the Zeruiani "which is so great a realm that from it, as their tradition relates, all the tribes of the Slavs are sprung and trace their origin". It was the first Latin source to claim that all Slavs have originated from the same homeland.

== Quote ==
Zeruiani tantum est reguum, ut ex eo cunctae gentes Sclavorum exortae sint, et originem, sicut affirmant, ducant
Zeruiani which is so great a realm that from it, as their tradition relates, all the tribes of the Slavs are sprung and trace their origin

== Etymology ==
The tribe and its territory has not been identified and localized yet.

While 19th century scholars assumed it to have been connected to early Serbs (although they are already mentioned in the same source as Surbi), Czech anthropologist Lubor Niederle and Polish historian Kazimierz Tymieniecki also considered it as a corruption of either Sarmatians or Severians. Modern Polish scholars like Henryk Łowmiański argued it as a corrupted form of the name of the Severians. It is argued that the connections with the Serbs is impossible because the Northern Serbs lived on other part of Europe which also doesn't fit with the list, and the Serbian ethnonym was never written with the Slavic suffix -jane (-eani), while the tribal name of the Severians was written in both collective Sever and plural Severjane form, etymologically implying Severian tribes. Gerard Labuda considered those tribes arrived from the Lesser Poland and western Ukraine, while Ryszard Kiersnowski assumed the Zeriuani were a relic of a large group which lived along the river Oder, but as there was no recorded tribe with such a name in those parts it also indicates the Ruthenian and Balkan Severians. A more probable etymological derivation of both Zeriuani and Zuierani, although their mutual connection is doubtful, is proposed by Tadeusz Lehr-Spławiński and many others, relating them to Cherven Cities and hydronym *Czerwia. However, based on the location of other tribes and phenomenological reasons, it is also possible to be a corruption of the name of Drevlians.

== See also ==
- Sporoi, mentioned by Procopius

== Sources ==
- Cross, Samuel Hazzard (1963). Slavic civilization through the ages. Russell & Russell. p. 6. ISBN 9780846203223.
- Komatina, Predrag (2020). "Slavic Ethnonyms in the Bavarian Geographer: A Historiographic Linguistic Analysis". Studia Slavica et Balcanica Petropolitana (in Russian) (1): 106–137. doi:10.21638/SPBU19.2020.106. hdl:21.15107/rcub_dais_10762.
- Lelewel, Joachim (1852). Géographie du moyen âge: accompagné datlas et de cartes dans chaque volume. Schletter. p. 43.
- Palacký, František (1876). Dějiny národu českého w Čechách a w Morawě: dle půwodních pramenůw. Nákl. knihkupce F. Tempského. pp. 89–.
- Persowski, Franciszek (1962). Studia nad pograniczem polsko-ruskim w X-XVI wieku. Zakład Narodowy im. Ossolińskich. p. 73.
- Šafařík, Pavel Josef (1865). Rozpravy z oboru věd slovanských. Nákladem kněhkupce Bedřicha Tempského. pp. 29–.
- Witczak, Krzysztof Tomasz (2013). "Poselstwo ruskie w państwie niemieckim w roku 839: Kulisy śledztwa w świetle danych Geografa Bawarskiego". Slavia Orientalis (in Polish and English). 62 (1): 34, 37–43.
- Zeuss, Johann Caspar (1837). Die Deutschen und die Nachbarstämme. I. J. Lentner. pp. 615–.
