= Polochans =

East Slavic tribe

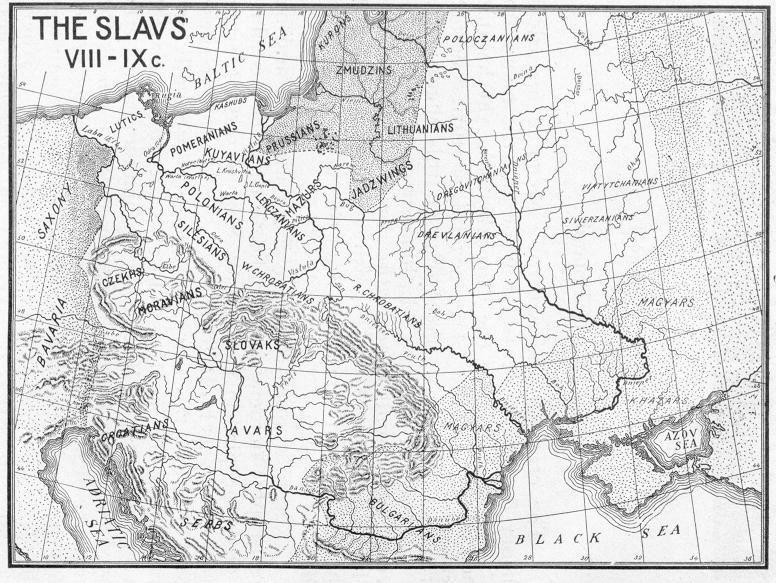
Distribution of Slavic tribes in the 9th century. The Polochan territory is located near the upper Western Dvina River.

The Polochans, or Palachans (Belarusian: Палачане, Russian: Полочане), were a tribe of early East Slavs, who inhabited the area in the middle of the Western Dvina in the 9th century. Alternative meaning: inhabitants of Polotsk.

They are mentioned in the Primary Chronicle, which explains that the name "polochans" derived from the Polota River, Western Dvina's tributary. It further says that Krivichs were descendants of Polochans. The lands of the Polochans spanned towards the upper reaches of the Svislach on the south and along the left bank of the Biarezina River to the lands of the Dregovichs. The Polochan lands bordered with the following tribes:

- To the southeast - Smolensk Krivichs
- To the north and east - Izborsk Krivichs and Novgorod Slavs
- To the west - Lithuanian tribes

The Polochan tribe was one of the tribes which would later form the Principality of Polotsk.

== See also ==
- List of Medieval Slavic tribes
