= Seven Slavic tribes =

Union of Slavic peoples in present-day northern Bulgaria from the 7th-9th centuries

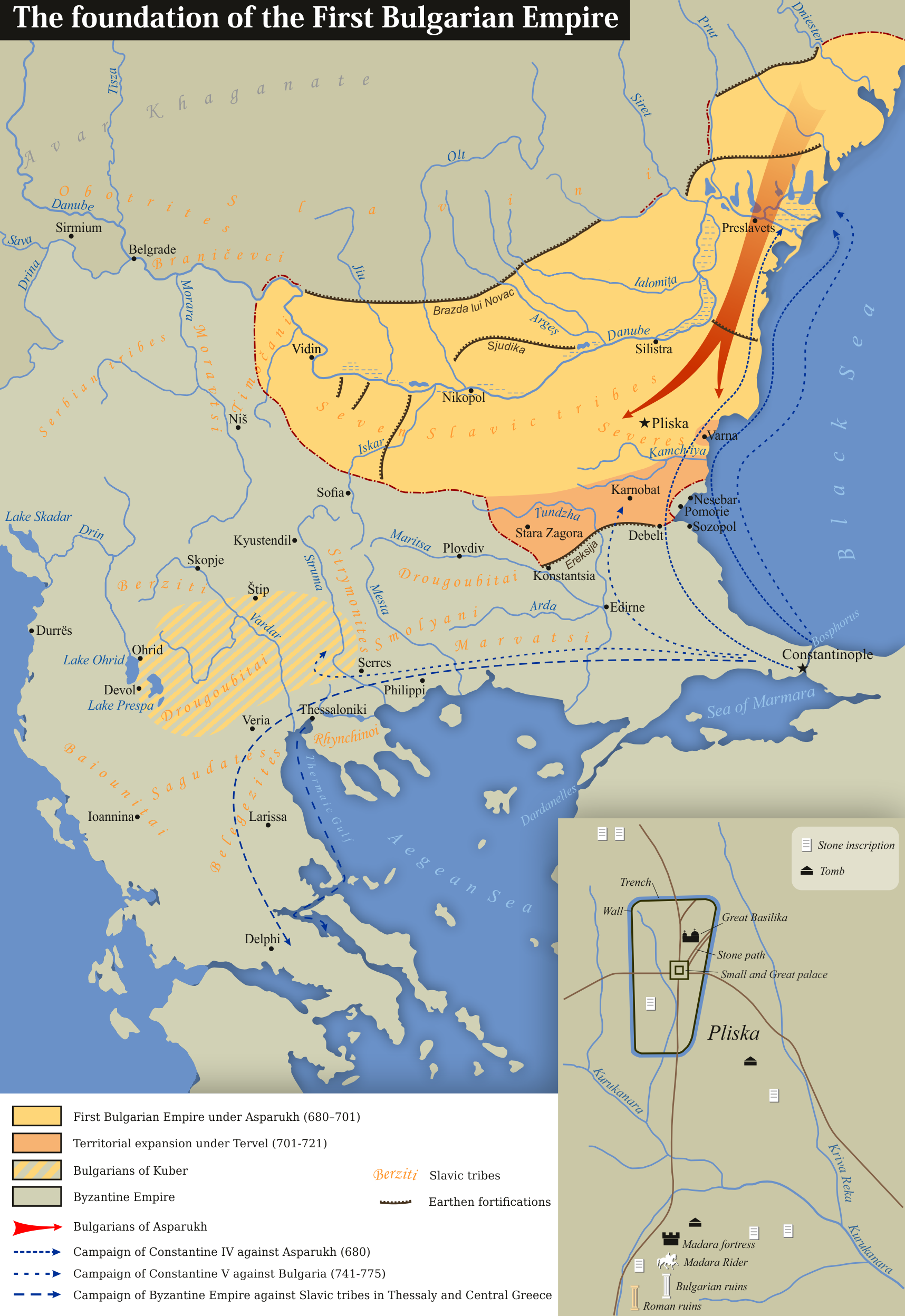
Seven slavic tribes during the foundation of the First Bulgarian Empire in 681

The Seven Slavic tribes (Bulgarian: Седемте славянски племена, romanized: Sedemte slavyanski plemena), also called the Seven clans (Bulgarian: Седемте рода, romanized: Sedemte roda) were a union of Slavic tribes in the Danubian Plain, that was established around the middle of the 7th century and took part in the formation of the First Bulgarian Empire together with the Bulgars in 680−681.

== History ==
Since the union's establishment, it faced attacks from the Byzantine Empire. They concluded an alliance with the Bulgars in the 670s after the latter crossed the Danube River. Theophanes writes that the Bulgars became masters of the Slavs. The Seven Tribes recognized the sovereignty of Khan Asparuh, and together, in the spring of 681, they won a major victory over the Byzantines.

In the late 7th century the Seven Tribes were assigned the defence of the newly-established Bulgar Khanate's western and northwestern border (the Iskar River up to its mouth in the Danube) against Avar raids, as well as some of the passes of the Balkan Mountains. The Severi, whose possible participation in the union is unclear, guarded the eastern part of the mountains.

The Seven Slavic Tribes, together with other Slavic and non-Slavic tribes of the Bulgarian Empire, gradually coalesced into a single Bulgarian people group in the 9th century. The reasons for this ethnic formation included the Christianization of Bulgaria under Boris I and the preceding administrative reforms that deprived the various tribes of their autonomy and self-government.

== See also ==
- List of Medieval Slavic tribes
