= Buzhans =

The Buzhans (Note: Russian: Бужане, romanized: Buzhane; Ukrainian: Бужани; Polish: Bużanie.) were a tribal union of Early Slavs, which supposedly formed the East Slavs in southern Russia and the Volga region. They are mentioned as Buzhane in the Primary Chronicle. Several localities in Russia are claimed to be connected to the Buzhans, such as Sredniy Buzhan in Orenburg Oblast, and Buzhan and the Buzan River in Astrakhan Oblast.

Some theories say that the name of the tribes could be connected to Western Bug, in Ukraine, where they chose to settle down. According to the Bavarian Geographer, the Buzhans had 230 "cities" (fortresses). Some historians believe that the Buzhans and the Volhynians used to be called the Dulebes.

There are even theories connecting the name of the river, region and country of Bosnia to the Buzhans. These theories are mostly promoted by the Bavarian Geographer, Joachim Lelewel and Muhamed Hadžijahić.

== See also ==
- List of early Slavic peoples
