= Lach (name) =

Lach (Polish pronunciation: pronounced [ˈlax]), Lyakh or Ljach is a surname. It was used by East Slavs to refer to Poles. Ethnic Poles in Nowy Sącz (south-eastern Poland) also used the name, referring to themselves as Lachy Sądeckie. According to Paweł Jasienica, it derives from the name of an ancient Polish tribe, the Lendians. Due to population resettlements of ethnic Poles after the Soviet annexation of eastern Polish territories (see Kresy), it is slightly more frequent in western Poland. Over 10,000 people have this surname in Poland. In the Czech Republic and Slovakia, Lach served as a short form of the personal name Ladislav. It is also a variant of Lah, a Slovene word for Vlachs.

Notable people with the name include:

- Andrei Lyakh (born 1990), Russian footballer
- Elmer Lach (1918–2015), Polish-Canadian ice hockey player
- Günter Lach (1954–2021), German politicians
- Juan Sebastian Lach (born 1970), Mexican composer

== See also ==
- Lech (name)
- Polish name
- Lendians
