= Bohemians (tribe) =

Early Slavic people of Bohemia

The Bohemians (Latin: Behemanni, Beehaimi, Beheimi, Behemi, Boemani, Behemitae, Behemenses) or Bohemian Slavs (Latin: Sclavi qui dicitur Behaimi, Bohemos Slavos, Boemanos Sclavos), as a term designates an early Slavic group of peoples living in Bohemia (modern Czech Republic), meaning the early Czechs. Their land became recognised as the Duchy of Bohemia around 870 (later becoming Kingdom of Bohemia).

Their main adversary and partner was Francia, and around the early 9th century emerged a layer of castles with their own hereditary aristocracy, but while Mojmir I seized control over Moravians and founded a state Great Moravia (830s), the Czechs did only since Bořivoj I, the first historically documented Duke of Bohemia from about 870 and progenitor of the Přemyslid dynasty.

The related hypothesis about the Bohemian/Czech tribes was formed in the 19th century, based on the 12th-century chronicle Chronica Boemorum (specifically from its late 11th century Prague Charter) by Cosmas of Prague, that mentions “pseudo-tribes", but by the 21st century, that hypothesis became "completely abandoned".

== History ==
=== Early history and gens ===
The Slavs arrived in Bohemia in the 6th century after it had been vacated by the westward movement of Germanic tribes during the Migration Period. According to historian Dušan Třeštík, they advanced through the Moravian Gate (Moravská brána) valley and in the year 530 moved into Eastern Bohemia, along the rivers Labe (Elbe) and Vltava (Moldau) further into Central Bohemia, composed of separate groups from Ukraine and Carpathian Basin (with the Czechs possibly belonging to the latter group), fought with neighboring Pannonian Avars until the coming of Samo in the early 7th century.

The late 9th-century Bavarian Geographer mentions Beheimare having 15 civitates, but there's no correlation with the rest of the names from the Prague Charter (1086). Historical sources mention only single gens ("people" or "tribe") living in the principality of Bohemia, and usually mention the people or tribe of Bohemians rather than a country of the same name. The earliest recording of the term of Czechs is from the 10th century Old Church Slavonic legend of Saint Wenceslaus I, Duke of Bohemia.

In the second half of the 8th century and early 9th century, archaeologically, a change occurred in the use of Late Avar and Byzantine type of elite findings imported from the Carpathian Basin, with those of Carolingian type, a change of political network of hillforts, and the burial rite to inhumation.

=== Aftermath ===
In the Royal Frankish Annals (9th century), it is recorded that in 791 part of Charlemagne's army marched through Bohemia for the Avar Wars. In 805, the Charles the Younger launched a campaign against the Slavs in Bohemia, "ravaged their native land from one end to the other and killed their chief Lecho". The next year, forces from Bavaria, Alamannia and Burgundy were sent to attack Bohemia, "after laying waste much of the land the army returned without serious losses". In 822, the Bohemians sent an embassy with gifts alongside other Slavs (Obodrites, Wilzi, Sorbs, Moravians, Praedenecenti as well as Pannonian Avars) to a Louis the Pious's general assembly at Frankfurt.

In the Annales Fuldenses (9th century), it is recorded that in 845, fourteen Bohemian duces submitted to the Frankish king Louis the German and received baptism. The next year, on the return from the war with the Moravians, the Frankish army suffered greatly in Bohemia due to their treachery. In 847 and 848, king Louis the German sent expeditions against the Bohemians because they "were planning rebellion" (according to the Annales Bertiniani they attacked the Frankish frontier), and "crushed them, forcing them to send ambassadors to sue for peace and to give hostages". In 849, the "Bohemians in their usual fashion denied their loyalty and planned to rebel against the Franks", because of which dux Ernest was sent with a large army to crush them, resulting in a military debacle due to the feud between Ernest and Thachulf, with the Bohemians killing many Franks and their nobles. In August 856, king Louis the German's army, after a successful attack on the Sorbs and Daleminzi, was returning through the lands of the Bohemians "and received the surrender of several of their duces". The next year, the brother of Sclavitag/Slavitach, son of rebellious Wiztrach dux of Bohemians, found a refuge at the court of Zistibor of Sorbs before he was made new dux of Bohemians by the Franks.

In 869, the Bohemians, alongside Sorbs, Siusli "and the other peoples of the region and crossed the old Thuringian border: they laid many places waste and killed some who rashly came together to attack them". In August of the same year, many Bohemian mercenaries recruited by the Sorbs, were killed and forced to return home or surrender by Louis the German, Thuringian and Saxon forces, but in 869-870 was negotiated a peace treaty with the king, Carloman and Charles the Bald. In October 871, Louis the German sent Bavarian and Franconian troops against the Bohemians, and at the same time in Bohemia were Moravians who were on their way back with the daughter of a Bohemian dux, presumably to marry an unidentified Moravian magnate, possibly implying that Svatopluk I of Moravia was planning to ally with the Bohemians. In the next year, king Louis the German began a campaign against Svatopluk, with the forces of the Saxons and Thuringians marching against Bohemia, but due to lack of cooperation lost many numbers and fled back, however, was sent a second army of Franks led by Arn (bishop of Würzburg) which defeated six Bohemian duces (Zwentislan, Witislan, Heriman, Spoitimar, Moyslan and Goriwei), but the Moravians were successful, and in the end weakened Frankish forces had to return home through Bohemia "with great difficulty". Goriwei most probably can be identified with the Bořivoj I, Duke of Bohemia.

After the Viking raids in the Rhineland against the Saxons in 880, joint forces of the Sorbs, Daleminzi, Bohemians and other nearby tribes attacked the Slavs around the Saale river, "faithful to the Thuringians with plunder and burning. Count Poppo, dux of the Sorbian march, came against them with the Thuringians, and with God's help so defeated them that not one out of a great multitude remained". In the late 9th century, an oath of fidelity mission with gifts from Bohemians reached Regensburg to king Arnulf, with "all the duces of the Bohemians, whom the dux Zwentibold had long kept by force from the alliance and control of the Bavarian people. The leading ones were Spitignevo and Witizla, and they came to the king and were honourably received by him". Bohemians also called the Moravians as "enemies" and "oppressors". In 900, the "Bavarians proceeded through Bohemia, and, taking the Bohemians with them, invaded the kingdom of the Moravians and destroyed everything with fire for three weeks on end. Then they returned home in complete safety".

Alfred the Great in his Geography of Europe (888–893) relying on Orosius, recorded that to east of the Bavarians are the Bohemians, and that the Moravians to the west have the Bohemians and Thuringians.

Josippon (10th century) mentions "Boymin" separate from Moravians, Croats, Sorbs, Kraków and others. The Arab historians and geographers Al-Masudi and Al-Bakri (10th and 11th century) writing on the Saqaliba possibly mentioned Bohemians and their rulers, but Ibrahim ibn Yaqub mentioned that Boleslaus I, Duke of Bohemia polity extended from F.raghah (Prague), Bawaymah to Karakwa (Kraków), and "strange as it seems, the Bohemians are dark-skinned and black-haired. A blond person can rarely be found among them".

Thietmar of Merseburg in his Chronicon Thietmari (11th century), speaking about Thuringia, wrote that "in the reign of the Duke Svatopluk we were ruled by Bohemian princes. Our ancestors paid him an annual tribute and he had bishops in his country, then called Marierun [Moravia]".

Cosmas of Prague's Chronica Boemorum (12th century), describes the legendary foundation of the Bohemian (Czech) state by the earliest Bohemians around the year 600 (Duke Bohemus, Duke Krok and his three daughters), Duchess Libuše and the foundation of Přemyslid dynasty by her marriage with Přemysl, old bloody wars, Duke Bořivoj and the introduction of Christianity in Bohemia, Saint Wenceslaus and his grandmother Saint Ludmila, reign of the three Boleslavs, the life of Saint Adalbert of the Slavník dynasty and bloody wars including the massacre of the Slavníks in 995 and others after year 1000.

12th and 13th-century Hungarian chronicles mention early 10th-century incursions of the Hungarians into Bohemia, which is supported by archeological evidence and interpreted as booty of defeated Hungarians or gifts between Bohemian and Hungarian elite.

== Hypothesis about the Czech tribes ==
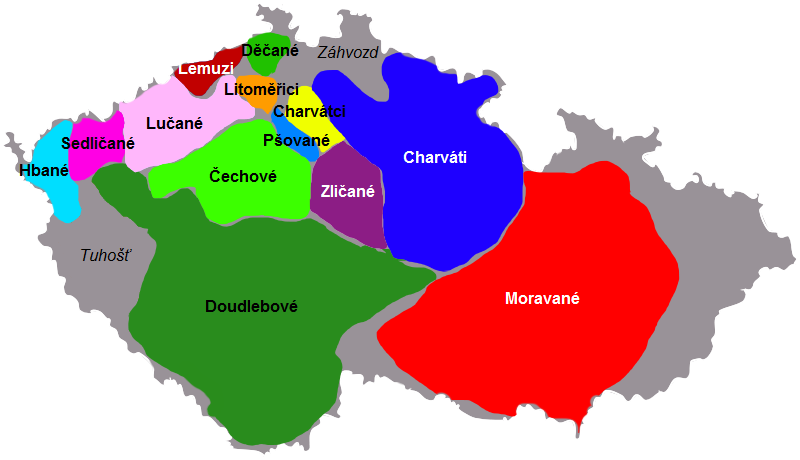
Hypothetical location and territorial affiliation of the "Czech tribes" shown in various colours on a map of the modern Czech Republic, as envisioned by Rudolf Turek (1957).

As the history before the formation of the Duchy of Bohemia has been insufficiently illuminated by historical sources, it has led since the 19th century to various hypotheses and scientific disputes about the character of its inhabitants.

Initially, there was a dispute between Czech and German historians, led by František Palacký and Ernst Dümmler, over whether there was a centralised and united Bohemia since the very beginning. Václav Vladivoj Tomek, in support of the Czech case, claimed that the Přemyslids ruled over subordinated tribes, based on the 12th-century Cosmas of Prague's Chronica Boemorum, specifically the Prague Charter from 1086 AD in the chronicle which names border points of the diocese (Tugust, Zedlza, Lusane, Dazana, Liutomerici, Lemuzi, Pssouane, Chrouati et altera Chrowati, Zlasane, Trebouane, Pobarane, Dedosize), which in then historiography was assumed "to reflect the original "tribal" arrangement of Bohemia even before the centralized Přemyslid state was created in the 10th century". In that sense, would be considered existence of a tribe of Czechs in central Bohemia represented by Přemyslids who eventually emerged victorius, and a large part of the South Bohemia was given to Dulebes.

As older historical sources do not mention these tribes, nor is there a convincing existence of a simultaneous tribal and central government, in the late 19th and early 20th century, Julius Lippert added that Bohemia from the beginning was formed by small tribes who immigrated separately to Bohemia and would become united under the rule of the Přemyslids. This reasoning was made by Jaroslav Goll and Václav Novotný into an official theory. Václav Vaněček's contribution to the hypothesis was seeing these tribes as based on common territory rather than common ancestry, and solving the problem of historical sources mentioning only the Bohemians by "expelling" the Bohemians from Bohemia to the Danube region (also supported by Rostislav Nový). The hypothesis was also attempted by archaeologists, specifically by Rudolf Turek, who made a well-known map of Czech tribes in 1957, which persisted as a reference point for the rest of the 20th-century literature.

By the end of the 20th century and the early 21st century, the hypothesis about the Czech tribes became rejected and abandoned (with an exception of Petr Charvát), as the considerations about the existence of different tribes from historiographical and archaeological evidence are unfounded and unconvincing. As concluded by Dušan Třeštík in 2011 for the Akademická encyklopedie českých dějin (Academic Encyclopedia of Czech History) published by the Czech Academy of Sciences, early medieval Bohemia was represented by individual local princes/dukes who often acted together and probably held a tribal assembly, but "what were considered to be the names of tribes in the sources of the 10th century and later (Lučané, Lemuzi, Pšowane, Sedličané, Děčané, Litoměřice, Zličané, Hbané and some others) are the names of landscapes. The real tribal name is Croats, but they did not sit in Bohemia, but somewhere in Silesia".

== See also ==
- Prague slave trade

== Notes and sources ==
=== Sources ===
- Dvornik, Francis (1949). The Making of Central and Eastern Europe. London: Polish Research Centre Ltd.
- Dvornik, Francis (1956). The Slavs: Their Early History and Civilization. Boston: American Academy of Arts and Sciences.
- Goldberg, Eric J. (2006). Struggle for Empire: Kingship and Conflict under Louis the German, 817-876. Ithaca, NY: Cornell University Press. ISBN 9780801438905.
- Kalhous, David (2012). Anatomy of a Duchy: The Political and Ecclesiastical Structures of Early Přemyslid Bohemia. BRILL. ISBN 978-90-04-22980-8.
- Reuter, Timothy, ed. (1992). The Annals of Fulda. Manchester: Manchester University Press.
- Scholz, Bernhard W.; Rogers, Barbara, eds. (1970). Carolingian Chronicles: Royal Frankish Annals and Nithard's Histories. Ann Arbor: University of Michigan Press.
- Turek, Rudolf (1982). Čechy v raném středověku (in Czech). Prague: Vyšehrad.
