= Linones =

Slavic ethnic group

The Linones were a small Slavic people first recorded in the early 9th century. They lived north and east of the Elbe, across from Höhbeck in the region around Lenzen, south of the Wilzi and Obotrites, north of the Hevelli and northeast of the Saxons. They may have been a sub-group of the Wilzi and were often under Obotrite control. They may be associated with the medieval Gau Liezizi.

The Annals of Lorsch classifies the Linones as Wends. According to the Royal Frankish Annals, in 808 the Linones and Smeldingi "defected" to the Danish king Gudfred and in response the Frankish king Charles the Younger ravaged their lands. It is probable that the Linones submitted to Danish authority and cooperated in the Danes' attack on the Obotrites that year, which resulted in the destruction of the emporium of Reric. The language of the Annals implies that they had previously recognized Frankish suzerainty. Rather than come to the aid of their Obotrite allies directly, by attacking the Danes, the Franks launched a punitive expedition against the weaker Linones and Smeldingi, who were both more accessible and more immediately threatening as they lived on the border of the Frankish empire. The army, led by the Emperor Charlemagne's son in person, was probably drawn mainly from Neustria. While the Royal Frankish Annals depicts a Frankish victory, the Annals of Lorsch suggests a serious check or reverse with heavy losses followed by retreat. The Chronicle of Moissac confirms that Charles suffered serious losses. The response of the Danes, who sued for peace, suggests that the Frankish expedition was nonetheless a successful show of force.

In 811, following the annual spring assembly, Charlemagne sent another punitive expedition against the Linones. The army also rebuilt the fortress of Höhbeck, which the Wilzi had destroyed in 810. The Linones may have been involved in that attack. According to the Chronicle of Moissac, the lands of the Bechelenzi were also devastated in 811.

In later records, the Linones are mentioned sporadically in association with the Obotrites. In 838, Louis the German rebelled against the Emperor Louis the Pious, while King Horik I of Denmark demanded that the emperor transfer authority over the Obotrites to Denmark. A general uprising among the Elbean Slavs followed. The Obotrites, Wilzi, Linones, Sorbs and Colodices are said to have taken part. In 839, according to the Annals of Saint-Bertin, Louis the Pious dispatched an army composed of Austrasians and Thuringians against the Obotrites and Linones. In 858, according to the Annals of Fulda, King Louis the German sent an army under his son Louis the Younger against the Obotrites and Linones. This was perhaps connected with a Danish attack on Saxony mentioned in the Annals of Saint-Bertin.

The Linones are one of the peoples listed in the Catalogue of Fortresses and Regions to the North of the Danube, which was produced at the court of Louis the German between 844 and 862, most likely in 845. The peoples living on the frontier of Louis's kingdom are listed from north to south. The Linones, "who have seven fortresses", come after the Wilzi and before the Bechelenzi, Smeldingi and Morizani (who are grouped together).

== Bibliography ==
- The Annals of St-Bertin. Translated by Janet L. Nelson. Manchester University Press. 1991.
- The Annals of Fulda. Translated by Timothy Reuter. Manchester University Press. 1992.
- Carolingian Chronicles: Royal Frankish Annals and Nithard's Histories. Translated by Bernhard Walter Scholz. University of Michigan Press. 1970.
- Collins, Roger (1998). Charlemagne. Macmillan. doi:10.1007/978-1-349-26924-2. ISBN 978-1-350-36252-9.
- Fried, Johannes (2016) [2013]. Charlemagne. Translated by Peter Lewis. Harvard University Press.
- Goldberg, Eric J. (2006). Struggle for Empire: Kingship and Conflict under Louis the German, 817–876. Cornell University Press. ISBN 978-0-8014-7529-0.
- Kats, J. M. J. G.; Claszen, D. (2012). Chronicon Moissiacense Maius: A Carolingian World Chronicle From Creation until the First Years of Louis the Pious (MA thesis). Leiden University.
- Melleno, Daniel (2017). "Between Borders: Franks, Danes, and Abodrites in the Trans-Elben World up to 827". Early Medieval Europe. 25 (3): 359–385. doi:10.1111/emed.12215.
- Minois, Georges (2014). Charlemagne. Perrin. doi:10.3917/perri.minoi.2014.01. ISBN 9782262044237.
- Rossignol, Sébastien (2011). "Aufstieg und Fall der Linonen. Misslungene Ethnogenese an der unteren Mittelelbe". In Karl-Heinz Willroth; Jens Schneeweiß (eds.). Slawen an der Elbe. Wachholtz. pp. 15–38.
- Rossignol, Sébastien (2013). "Die Linonen zwischen Tat und Wort: Die Schriftquellen über die Entwicklung an der unteren Mittelelbe unter Berücksichtigung der interdisziplinären Forschungsergebnisse". In Karl-Heinz Willroth; Hans-Jürgen Beug; Friedrich Lüth; Franz Schopper; Sebastian Messal; Jens Schneeweiss (eds.). Slawen an der unteren Mittelelbe: Untersuchungen zur ländlichen Besiedlung, zum Burgenbau, zu Besiedlungsstrukturen und zum Landschaftswandel. Beiträge zum Kolloquium vom 7. bis 9. April 2010 in Frankfurt a. M. Reichert. pp. 135–150.
- Rossignol, Sébastien (2019). "The Entry of Early Medieval Slavs into World History: The Chronicle of Moissac". In Balázs Nagy; Felicitas Schmieder; András Vadas (eds.). The Medieval Networks in East Central Europe: Commerce, Contacts, Communication. Routledge. pp. 43–57.
