= Moravians (tribe) =

Slavic tribe of the 6th to 9th centuries

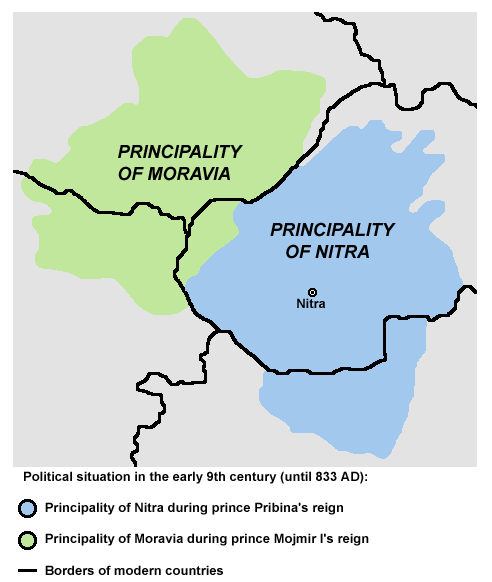
The Moravian principality in 833 (green)

The Moravians (Old Slavic self-designation Moravljane, Slovak: Moravania, Czech: Moravané) were a West Slavic tribe in the Early Middle Ages. Although it is not known exactly when the Moravian tribe was founded, Czech historian Dušan Třeštík claimed that the tribe was formed between the turn of the 6th century to the 7th century, around the same time as the other Slavic tribes. In the 9th century Moravians settled mainly around the historic region of Moravia and Nitrans in Western Slovakia, but moravians also in parts of Lower Austria (up to the Danube)

The first known mention of the Moravians was in the Annales Regni Francorum in 822 AD. The tribe was located by the Bavarian Geographer (as Marharii) Nitran tribe as Merehani between the tribe of the Bohemians and the tribe of the Bulgarians. In the 9th century Moravians gain control over neighbouring Nitra and founded the realm of Great Moravia, ruled by the Mojmír dynasty until the 10th century. After the breakup of the Moravian realm the Moravian and Nitran tribes were divided between the Duchy of Bohemia and Principality of Hungary. The Moravians were assimilated by the Czechs and presently identify as Czechs (see Moravians (ethnic group)). The modern nation of the Slovaks was partially formed out of Nitran tribe within the Kingdom of Hungary.

== See also ==
- Bohemians (tribe)

== Sources ==
- Graus, František (1980). Die Nationenbildung der Westslawen im Mittelalter. Jan Thorbecke Verlag, Sigmaringen. ISBN 3-7995-6103-X. (German)
- Lubomír E. Havlík: Svatopluk Veliký, král Moravanů a Slovanů [Svatopluk the Great. King of the Moravians and Slavs]. Jota, Brno 1994, ISBN 80-85617-19-6. (Czech)
- Havlík, Lubomír E. (2013). Kronika o Velké Moravě. Jota, o.O. ISBN 978-80-8561-706-1. (Czech)
- Třeštík, Dušan (2008). Počátky Přemyslovců. Vstup Čechů do dějin (530–935) [The Beginnings of the Přemyslids. The Enter of the Czechs into History (530–935)]. Nakladatelství Lidové noviny, o.O. ISBN 978-80-7106-138-0. (Czech)
- Dušan Třeštík: Vznik Velké Moravy. Moravané, Čechové a střední Evropa v letech 791–871 [The Founding of Great Moravia. Moravians, Czechs and Middle Europe in the years 791–871]. Nakladatelství Lidové noviny, o.O. 2010, ISBN 978-80-7422-049-4 (Czech)
- Tennent, Gilbert (1743). Some Account of the Principles of the Moravians. Moravians (tribe) at Google Books
