= Bavarian Geographer =

Anonymous author of a medieval manuscript

The epithet "Bavarian Geographer" (Latin: Geographus Bavarus) is the conventional name for the anonymous author of a short Latin medieval text containing a list of the tribes in Central and Eastern Europe, headed Descriptio civitatum et regionum ad septentrionalem plagam Danubii (Latin for 'Description of cities and lands north of the Danube').

The name "Bavarian Geographer" was first bestowed (in its French form, "Géographe de Bavière") in 1796 by Polish count and scholar Jan Potocki. The term is now also used at times to refer to the document itself.

It was the first Latin source to claim that all Slavs originated in the same homeland, called the Zeriuani.

== Origin ==
Source text of document

Descriptio civitatum et regionum ad septentrionalem plagam Danubii. Isti sunt qui propinquiores resident finibus Danaorum, quos vocant Nortabtrezi, ubi regio, in qua sunt civitates LIII per duces suos partite. Uuilci, in qua civitates XCV et regiones IIII. Linaa est populus, qui habet civitates VII. Prope illis resident, quos vocant Bethenici et Smeldingon et Morizani, qui habent civitates XI. Iuxta illos sunt, qui vocantur Hehfeldi, qui habent civitates VIII. Iuxta illos est regio, que vocatur Surbi, in qua regione plures sunt, que habent civitates L. Iuxta illos sunt quos vocant Talaminzi, qui habent civitates XIII. Beheimare, in qua sunt civitates XV. Marharii habent civitates XL. Uulgarii regio est inmensa et populus multus habens civitates V, eo quod mutitudo magna ex eis sit et non sit eis opus civitates habere. Est populus quem vocant Merehanos, ipsi habent civitates XXX. Iste sunt regiones, que terminant in finibus nostris.

Isti sunt, qui iuxta istorum fines resident. Osterabtrezi, in qua civitates plus quam C sunt. Miloxi, in qua civitates LXVII. Phesnuzi habent civitates LXX. Thadesi plus quam CC urbes habent. Glopeani, in qua civitates CCCC aut eo amplius. Zuireani habent civitates CCCXXV. Busani habent civitates CCXXXI. Sittici regio inmensa populis et urbibus munitissimis. Stadici, in qua civitates DXVI populousque infinitus. Sebbirozi habent civitates XC. Unlizi populus multus civitates CCCCXVIII. Neriuani habent civitates LXXVIII. Attorozi habent civitates CXLVIII, populus ferocissimus. Eptaradici habent civitates CCLXIII. Uuilerozi habent civitates CLXXX. Zabrozi habent civitates CCXII. Znetalici habent civitates LXXIIII. Aturezani habent civitates CIIII. Chozirozi habent civitates CCL. Lendizi habent civitates XCVIII. Thafnezi habent civitates CCLVII. Zeriuani, quod tantum est regnum, ut ex eo cuncte genetes Sclauorum exorte sint et originem, sicut affirmant, ducant. Prissani civitates LXX. Uelunzani civitates LXX. Bruzi plus est undique quam de Enisa ad Rhenum Uuizunbeire Caziri civitates C. Ruzzi. Forsderen. Liudi. Fresiti. Serauici. Lucolane. Ungare. Uuislane. Sleenzane civitates XV. Lunsizi civitates XXX. Dadosesani civitates XX. Milzane civitates XXX. Besunzane civitates II. Uerizane civitates X. Fraganeo civitates XL. Lupiglaa civitates XXX. Opolini civitates XX. Golensizi civitates V.

The short document, written in Latin, was discovered in 1772 in the Bavarian State Library, Munich by Louis XV's ambassador to the Saxon court, Comte Louis-Gabriel Du Buat-Nançay. It had been acquired by the Wittelsbachs with the collection of the antiquarian Hermann Schädel (1410–85) in 1571. The document was much discussed in the early 19th-century historiography, notably by Nikolai Karamzin and Joachim Lelewel.

The provenance of the document is disputed. Although early commentators suggested that it could have been compiled in Regensburg, the list seems to have been taken from Codex Reginbertinus II, recorded in the 9th century in the library of the Reichenau Abbey and named after a local librarian. Based on these findings, Bernhard Bischoff attributes it to a monk active at Reichenau from the 830s to 850s. Aleksandr Nazarenko finds it more probable that the list was composed in the 870s, when Saint Methodius is believed to have resided at Reichenau. The document may have been connected with his missions in the Slavic lands. Henryk Łowmiański demonstrated that the list consists of two parts, which may be datable to different periods and attributed to distinct authors.

In modern times, some scholars attribute the information from this document to be limited, because it is largely geographic in nature, and its understanding of Eastern European geography is limited, so it may be a case of cosmography.

== Content ==
The document has a short introductory sentence and a list of 58 tribal names in Central and Eastern Europe, east of the Elbe and north of the Danube to the Volga River to the Black Sea and Caspian Sea (most of them of Slavonic origin, with Ruzzi, and others such as Vulgarii, etc.). Absent on the list are Polans, Pomeranians and Masovians, tribes first of whom are believed to have settled along the shores of the Warta river during the 8th century, as well Dulebes, Volhynians and White Croats, but instead mentioning several unknown tribes hard to identify. There is also some information about the number of strongholds (Latin: civitates) possessed by some of the tribes, however the number in several instances seems exaggerated. The list consists of two parts, first describing the tribes in the Eastern neighborhood of Francia (iste sunt regiones ... nostris), while the second or near or outside the zone of the first going in different directions. The tribes can be geographically grouped into Danubian, Silesian-Lusatian, Baltic, and Eastern Vistulan-Caspian.

=== List of tribes ===
According to Łowmiański (1958), in the first list are mentioned:

- 1. Nortabtrezi (Obotrites),
- 2. Uuilci (Veleti),
- 3. Linaa (Linones),
- 4.–6.Bethenici-Smeldingon (Smeldingi)-Morizani,
- 7. Hehfeldi (Hevelli),
- 8. Surbi (Sorbs/Serbs),
- 9. Talaminzi (Daleminzi-Glomacze),
- 10. Beheimare (Bohemians),
- 11. Marharii (Moravians),
- 12. Uulgarii (Bulgars),
- 13. Merehanos (Nitra Moravians).

In the second list are mentioned:

- 14. Osterabtrezi (other Obotrites),
- 15. Miloxi (uncertain),
- 16. Phesnuzi (unknown),
- 17. Thadesi (uncertain, Tadeslo),
- 18. Glopeani (Goplans),
- 19. Zuireani (uncertain),
- 20. Busani (Buzhans),
- 21. Sittici (uncertain),
- 22. Stadici (uncertain),
- 23. Sebbirozi (uncertain),
- 24. Unlizi (Ulichs),
- 25. Neriuani (uncertain),
- 26. Attorozi (uncertain),
- 27. Eptaradici (uncertain, Seven Slavic tribes),
- 28. Uuilerozi (uncertain),
- 29. Zabrozi (uncertain),
- 30. Znetalici (Netolice and Neletici),
- 31. Aturezani (unknown),
- 32. Chozirozi (uncertain),
- 33. Lendizi (Lendians),
- 34. Thafnezi (unknown),
- 35. Zeriuani (uncertain),
- 36. Prissani,
- 37. Uelunzani (Wolinians),
- 38. Bruzi (Prussians),
- 39. Uuizunbeire (Volga Bulgaria),
- 40. Caziri (Khazars),
- 41. Ruzzi (Rus' people),
- 42.–43. Forsderen-Liudi (uncertain, Drevlians),
- 44. Fresiti (unknown),
- 45. Serauici (unknown),
- 46. Lucolane (uncertain),
- 47. Ungare (Hungarians),
- 48. Uuislane (Vistulans),
- 49. Sleenzane (Silesians),
- 50. Lunsizi (Lusatians),
- 51. Dadosesani (Dziadoszanie),
- 52. Milzane (Milceni),
- 53. Besunzane (Bežunčani or Pšovans),
- 54. Uerizane (unknown),
- 55. Fraganeo (Prague),
- 56. Lupiglaa (uncertain),
- 57. Opolini (Opolans),
- 58. Golensizi.
