= Smeldingi =

West Slavic tribe that lived east of the Elbe river

The Smeldingi were a small group of Polabian Slavs living on the border of the Old Saxony in the 9th century, probably between the Elbe and the Havel. They were a sub-group of the Hevelli. Their name is derived from the Proto-Slavic word *smola ('resin') and is related to the ethnonym of the South Slavic Smolyani and the name of the East Slavic city of Smolensk.

Prior to 808, according to the Royal Frankish Annals, the Smeldingi and Linones recognized the suzerainty of the Franks. In that year, however, they switched their allegiance to the Danish king Gudfred and in response the Frankish king Charles the Younger ravaged their lands:

But Charles, the son of the emperor [Charlemagne], built a bridge across the Elbe, and moved the army under his command as fast as he could across the river against the Linones and Smeldingi. These tribes had also defected to Godofrid. Charles laid waste their fields far and wide and after crossing the river again returned to Saxony with his army unimpaired.

It is likely that the Smeldingi had participated in the Danes' attack on the Obotrites that year, which resulted in the destruction of the Obotrite emporium of Reric. Rather than come to the aid of their Obotrite allies directly, by attacking the Danes, the Franks launched a punitive expedition against the weaker Smeldingi and Linones, who were both more accessible and more immediately threatening as they lived on the border of the empire. While the Royal Frankish Annals depicts a Frankish victory, the Annals of Lorsch suggests a serious check or reverse with heavy losses followed by retreat. The response of the Danes, who sued for peace, suggests that the Frankish expedition was successful as a show of force. In 809, according to the Royal Frankish Annals, the Obotrites under Duke Thrasco attacked first the Wilzi and then the Smeldingi, forcing them to submit:

Supported by the Saxons, he attacked the neighboring Wilzi and laid waste their fields with fire and sword. Returning home with immense booty and with even more help from the Saxons, he conquered the largest city of the Smeldingi. By these successes he forced all who had defected from him to join him again.

The annalist's maxima civitas (largest city) is called Semeldinc Connoburg in the Chronicle of Moissac, but that is not its native Slavic name. The Chronicle confirms that the Saxons were a scara (detachment) sent by Charlemagne himself to aid "our Wends" (i.e., the Obotrites).

== Bibliography ==
- Carolingian Chronicles: Royal Frankish Annals and Nithard's Histories. Translated by Bernhard Walter Scholz. University of Michigan Press. 1970.
- Collins, Roger (1998). Charlemagne. Macmillan. doi:10.1007/978-1-349-26924-2.
- Jacobsson, Gunnar (1964). "A Rare Variant of the Name of Smolensk in Old Russian". Scando-Slavica. 10 (1): 148–153. doi:10.1080/00806766408600408.
- Kats, J. M. J. G.; Claszen, D. (2012). Chronicon Moissiacense Maius: A Carolingian World Chronicle From Creation until the First Years of Louis the Pious (MA thesis). Leiden University.
- Komatina, Predrag (2019). "Рани јужнословенски етноними и питање порекла и постанка јужнословенских племена" [Early South Slavic Ethnonyms and the Issue of Origin and Genesis of the South Slavic Tribes]. Наслеђе и стварање Свети Ћирило: Свети Сава 869-1219-2019 I (in Serbian). Belgrade: Institute of the Serbian Language of the Serbian Academy of Sciences and Arts. pp. 3–28. ISBN 978-86-82873-70-9.
- Melleno, Daniel (2017). "Between Borders: Franks, Danes, and Abodrites in the Trans‐Elben World up to 827". Early Medieval Europe. 25 (3): 359–385.
- Minois, Georges (2014). Charlemagne. Perrin.
- Rossignol, Sébastien (2019). "The Entry of Early Medieval Slavs into World History: The Chronicle of Moissac". In Balázs Nagy; Felicitas Schmieder; András Vadas (eds.). The Medieval Networks in East Central Europe: Commerce, Contacts, Communication. Routledge. pp. 43–57.
- Stone, Gerald (2016). Slav Outposts in Central European History: The Wends, Sorbs and Kashubs. Bloomsbury Academic.
