= Dregoviches =

Ancient East Slavic ethnic group

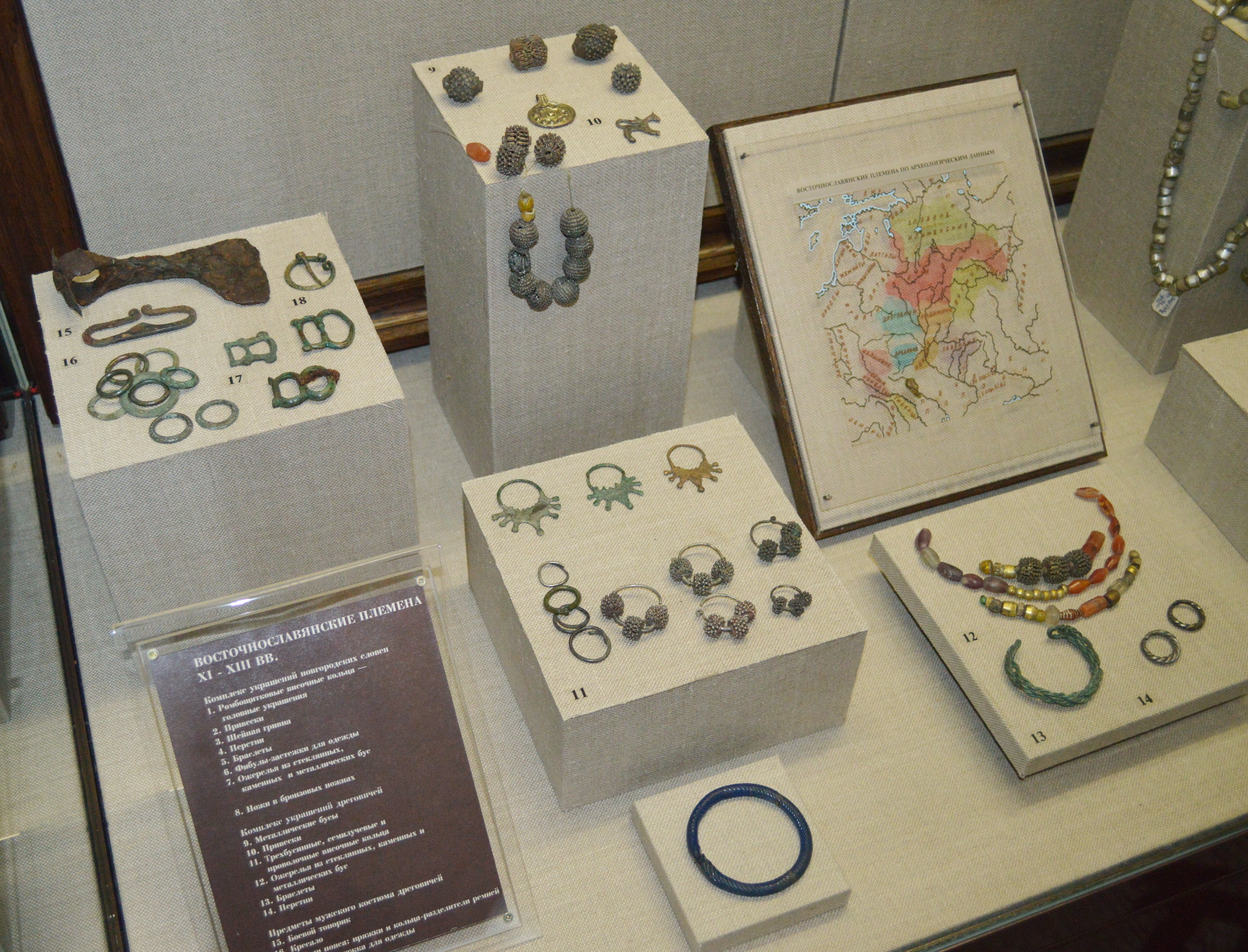
Iron axe and a fire striker attributed to the Dregoviches. Also a variety of male and female costume accessories: belt buckles, bracelets, beads and other jewelry. State Historical Museum of Russia

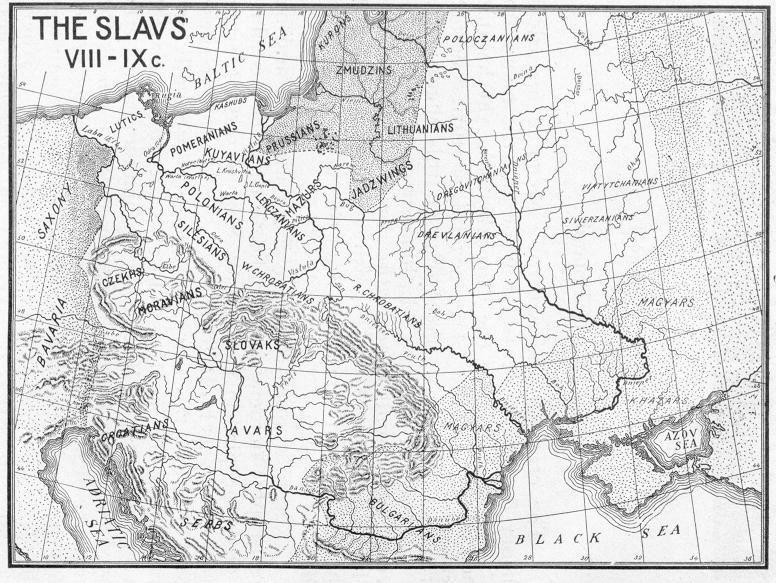
The Slavs in the 9th century

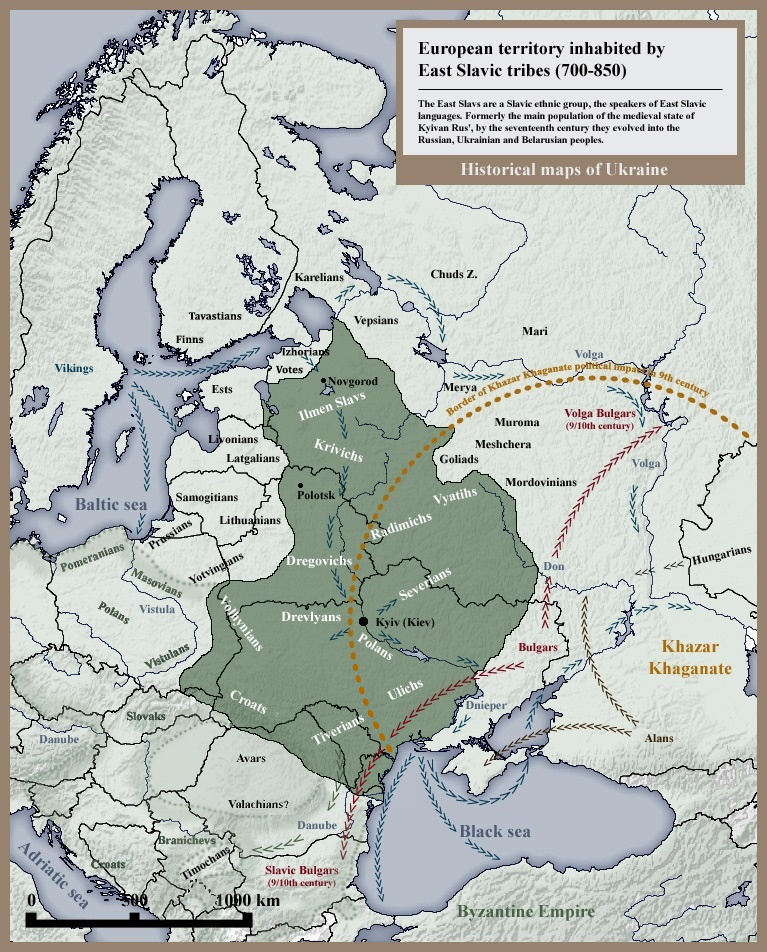
European territory inhabited by East Slavic tribes in 8th and 9th centuries.

The Dregoviches, (Note: Also spelled Dregovichi) or Dryhavichs, (Note: Belarusian: дрыгавічы, romanized: dryhavičy, [ˈdrɨɣavʲitʂɨ]; Russian: дреговичи, romanized: dregovichi; Ukrainian: дреговичі, romanized: drehovychi.) were an East Slavic tribal union. They inhabited the territories along the lower Pripyat River and the northern parts of the right bank of the Dnieper River (more exact extents of the tribe's domain are still unknown).

== Etymology ==
The name of the tribe most probably derives from the Proto-Slavic word "*drъgъva" (found only in Southern Belarusian as "dregva" and Northern Ukrainian as "dragva, dryagva", which is a loanword from Baltic languages "dreguva" meaning 'swamp'), because the Dregoviches used to live in the marshlands. O. N. Trubachev proposed a theory that the Balkan Slavic Drougoubitai might be related to the East Slavic Dregoviches.

== History ==
The first known reference to the Dregoviches is in the Primary Chronicle (c. 1113), where they are listed among the 12 tribes. However, there is a reference in the De Administrando Imperio (written between 948 and 952) of Constantine Porphyrogenitus to "Δρουγουβίται", "Drougoubitai". Since the reference appears in a passage describing the "Druguvitai" as one of the Slavic peoples who pay tribute to the princes of the Kievan Rus', and they are named alongside the Severians and Krivichians, it was suggested these are the same people as the Dregoviches. By the 12th century, they were assimilated into the main East Slavic peoples.

The chronicles do not tell historians much about the Dregoviches. We only know that they had their own princely rule in the city of Turov. In the 10th century, the lands of the Dregoviches became a part of Kievan Rus and later the Turov Principality. The northwestern part of the land of the Dregoviches became a part of the Polotsk Principality.

== See also ==
- List of early Slavic peoples
- Bibliography of Russian history

== Sources ==
- De Administrando Imperio of Constantine Porphyrogenitus, ed. R.J. Jenkins, Dumbarton Oaks Center for Byzantine Studies (1967)
