= Outline of Slavic history and culture =

Topical outline of articles about Slavic history and culture. This outline provides an overview of Slavic topics; for outlines on specific Slavic groups and topics, see the links in the Other Slavic outlines section below.

The Slavs are a collection of peoples who speak the various Slavic languages, belonging to the larger Balto-Slavic branch of the Indo-European languages. Slavs are geographically distributed throughout northern Eurasia, mainly inhabiting Central and Eastern Europe, the Balkans, and Siberia. A large Slavic minority is also scattered across the Baltic states and Central Asia, and from the late 19th century, a substantial Slavic diaspora developed throughout the Americas.

== Human geography ==
- Slavs
  - East Slavs, West Slavs, South Slavs
  - Antes people, Braničevci, Buzhans, Carantanians, Guduscani, Melingoi, Merehani, Slavs in Lower Pannonia, Praedenecenti, Sclaveni, Sebbirozi, Seven Slavic tribes, Severians, Zeriuani, Znetalici
  - Belarusians, Bosniaks, Bulgarians, Croats, Czechs, Kashubians, Macedonians, Montenegrins, Poles, Russians, Rusyns, Slovaks, Serbs, Slovenes, Sorbs, Ukrainians
- Slavic names, Slavic name suffixes

== History ==
Articles about Slavic history before the Mongol invasions of Slavic lands. For later periods, see outlines for individual Slavic groups.

=== Subjects ===
- Slavic migrations to the Balkans
- History of the Slavic languages

=== Tribes and peoples ===
- Early Slavs
- Gorani people
- Great Moravia
- Kievan Rus'
- Samo's Empire
- Seven Slavic tribes
- Slavic Pomeranians
- Slavs in Lower Pannonia

=== Individuals ===
- Nestor the Chronicler

Slavic pagans

Christianization of the Slavs took place from the 7th to 12th centuries, with a pagan reaction in Poland in the 1030s and conversion of the Polabian Slavs by the 1180s (see Wendish Crusade).

- Porga of Croatia (died 660), last pagan ruler of the Principality of Dalmatian Croatia
- Vlastimir of Serbia (died 851), last pagan ruler of the first Serbian principality
- Presian I of Bulgaria (died 852), last pagan ruler of the Bulgarian Empire
- Sviatoslav I of Kiev (died 972)
- Yaropolk I of Kiev (died 980), last pagan ruler of the Kievan Rus
- Mstivoj (died 995), leader of the Slavic revolt against Otto II, Holy Roman Emperor
- Niklot (died 1160), leader of the Obotrites

== Culture ==
Articles about general Slavic culture. For articles about specific Slavic cultures (e.g. Polish, Ukrainian), see outlines for individual Slavic groups.

=== Society ===
- Veche
- Slavic carnival

=== Literature and writing ===
- Slavic literature
- Pre-Christian Slavic writing
- Slavic mythology
- Slavic studies

=== Language ===
- History of the Slavic languages
- Balto-Slavic languages, Slavic languages, East Slavic languages, South Slavic languages, West Slavic languages
- History of the Slavic languages, Proto-Balto-Slavic language, Proto-Slavic language, History of Proto-Slavic, Proto-Slavic borrowings
- Old Church Slavonic, Church Slavonic
- Old East Slavic
- Interslavic
- Pan-Slavic language
- Slavic microlanguages

Orthography

- Glagolitic script, Relationship of Cyrillic and Glagolitic scripts, Proto-Slavic accent
- Macedonian language

=== Religion ===
- Christianization of the Slavs
- Slavic paganism, Slavic Native Faith

- Slavic Native Faith's theology and cosmology, Slavic Native Faith's identity and political philosophy, Slavic Native Faith and Christianity, Slavic Native Faith's calendars and holidays
- Slavic Native Faith in Ukraine, Slavic Native Faith in Poland, Slavic Native Faith in Russia

- Zhrets, Volkhv
- Peterburgian Vedism

==== Deities ====
- Morana (goddess)
- Mokosh

=== Folklore ===
- Lech, Czech, and Rus'
- Kyi, Shchek and Khoryv

==== Symbols ====
- Swastika § Europe

==== Chronicles ====
- Rus' chronicle
- List of Rus' chronicles
- Primary Chronicle
- Textual criticism of the Primary Chronicle
- Complete Collection of Russian Chronicles

=== Holidays ===
- Kupala Night
- Koliada
- Maslenitsa

== Lists ==
- List of Slavic cultures
- List of early Slavic peoples
- List of Slavic studies journals
- List of Slavic deities, List of Slavic pseudo-deities
- List of Balto-Slavic languages
- List of tribes and states in Belarus, Russia and Ukraine
- List of Glagolitic manuscripts
- List of Glagolitic books
- List of Slavic Native Faith's organisations

== Other ==
- Slavophilia
- Anti-Slavic sentiment
- Slavicization
- Pan-Slavism
- Neo-Slavism
- Austro-Slavism
- Slavs (ethnonym)
- Gord (archaeology)

== Other Slavic outlines ==
- Outline of Belarus
- Outline of Bosnia and Herzegovina
- Outline of Bulgaria
- Outline of Croatia
- Outline of the Czech Republic
- Outline of Montenegro
- Outline of North Macedonia
- Outline of Poland
- Outline of Russia
- Outline of Serbia
- Outline of Slovakia
- Outline of Slovenia
- Outline of Ukraine
- Outline of the Soviet Union
