= Zabrozi =

Zabrozi was a tribe mentioned by the 9th-century Bavarian Geographer (BG). It states that the Zabrozi inhabit 212 settlements.

== Quote ==
... Zabrozi habent civitates CCXII ...

== Studies ==
The Zabrozi are mentioned in BG after the Vuillerozi and before the Znetalici. Their name is dual-lexeme, made up of Zab and suffix -rozi, which is also found in the Sebbirozi, Attorozi, Vuillerozi and Chozirozi.

According to the Czechoslovak academy, their name is unclear. P. Šafárik identified the name as Zaprozi and connected it to Zaporizhzhia, a region on the Dnieper. A. Králiček identified it as Zabrce, a name he claimed was known since antiquity in the Carpathians that point to the Dacians, or Zabrodce, by etymology connected to Slavic brod. Some connect it to Sabirs (or Sawars).
