= List of Slavic cultures =

This is a list of the cultures of Slavic Europe.

- East Slavs:
  - Culture of Russia
  - Culture of Ukraine
  - Culture of Belarus
  - Rusyn culture
- South Slavs:
  - Culture of Bosnia and Herzegovina
  - Culture of Bulgaria
  - Culture of Croatia
  - Culture of Montenegro
  - Culture of North Macedonia
  - Culture of Serbia
  - Culture of Slovenia
- West Slavs:
  - Culture of Poland
  - Culture of Czechia
  - Culture of Slovakia
  - Kashubian culture
  - Lusatian culture
  - Polabian Slavs
  - Silesian culture
  - Sorbian culture

== See also ==
- Slavic folklore
- Egg decorating in Slavic culture
- Outline of Slavic history and culture
