= History of the Slavic languages =

The history of the Slavic languages stretches over 3000 years, from the point at which the ancestral Proto-Balto-Slavic language broke up (c. 1500 BC) into the modern-day Slavic languages which are today natively spoken in Eastern, Central and Southeastern Europe as well as parts of North Asia and Central Asia.

The first 2000 years or so consist of the pre-Slavic era: a long, stable period of gradual development during which the language remained unified, with no discernible dialectal differences.

The last stage in which the language remained without internal differences can be dated to around 500 AD and is sometimes termed Proto-Slavic proper or Early Proto-Slavic. Following this is the Common Slavic period (c. 500–1000 AD), during which the first dialectal differences appeared but the entire Slavic-speaking area continued to function as a single language, with sound changes tending to spread throughout the entire area.

By around 1000 AD, the area had broken up into separate East Slavic, West Slavic and South Slavic languages, and in the following centuries, i.e. 11–14th century, it broke up further into the various modern Slavic languages, of which the following are extant: Belarusian, Russian, Rusyn and Ukrainian in the East; Czech, Slovak, Polish, Kashubian and the Sorbian languages in the West, and Bulgarian, Macedonian, Serbo-Croatian and Slovene in the South.

The period from the early centuries AD to the end of the Common Slavic period around 1000 AD was a time of rapid change, concurrent with the explosive growth of the Slavic-speaking era. By the end of this period, most of the features of the modern Slavic languages had been established.

The first historical documentation of the Slavic languages is found in isolated names and words in Greek documents starting in the 6th century AD, when Slavic-speaking tribes first came in contact with the Greek-speaking Byzantine Empire.

The first continuous texts date from the late 9th century AD and were written in Old Church Slavonic—the first Slavic literary language, based on the South Slavic dialects spoken around Thessaloniki in Greek Macedonia—as part of the Christianization of the Slavs by Saints Cyril and Methodius and their followers. Because these texts were written during the Common Slavic period, the language they document is close to the ancestral Proto-Slavic language and is critically important to the linguistic reconstruction of Slavic-language history.

This article covers the development of the Slavic languages from the end of the Common Slavic period (c. 1000 AD) to the present time. See the article on Proto-Slavic for a description of the Proto-Slavic language of the late first millennium AD, and history of Proto-Slavic for the earlier linguistic history of this language.

== Origin ==
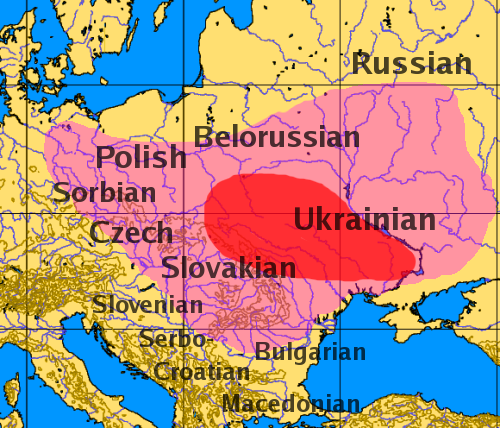
Historical distribution of the Slavic languages. The larger shaded area is the Prague-Penkov-Kolochin complex of cultures of the sixth to seventh centuries, likely corresponding to the spread of Slavic-speaking tribes of the time. The smaller shaded area indicates the core area of Slavic river names (after Mallory & Adams (1997:524ff)).

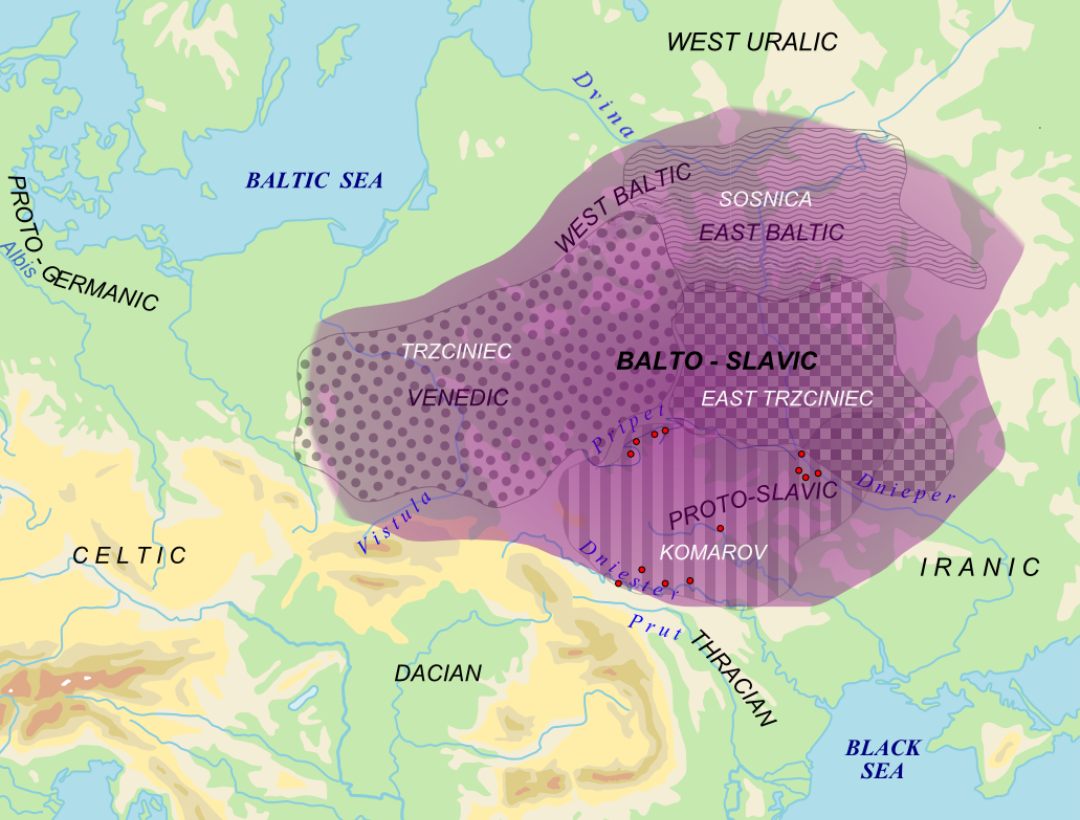
Area of Balto-Slavic dialect continuum (purple) with proposed material cultures correlating to speakers of Balto-Slavic in the Bronze Age (white). Red dots = archaic Slavic hydronyms

The development into Proto-Slavic probably occurred along the southern periphery of the Proto-Balto-Slavic continuum. This is concluded from Slavic hydronyms, the most archaic of which are found between the northeastern rim of the Carpathian mountains in the west, along the middle Dnieper, the Pripet, and the upper Dniester river in the east.

From around 500 BCE to 200 CE, the Scythians and then the Sarmatians expanded their control into the forest steppe. Consequently, a few Eastern Iranian loan words, especially relating to religious and cultural practices, have been seen as evidence of cultural influences. Subsequently, loan words of Germanic origin also appear. This is connected to the movement of east Germanic groups into the Vistula basin, and subsequently to the middle Dnieper basin, associated with the appearance of the Przeworsk and Chernyakhov cultures, respectively.

Into the Common Era, the various Balto-Slavic dialects formed a dialect continuum stretching from the Vistula to the Don and Oka basins, and from the Baltic and upper Volga to southern Russia and northern Ukraine. Beginning around 500 CE, the Slavic speakers rapidly expanded in all directions from a homeland in eastern Poland and western Ukraine. By the eighth century CE, Proto-Slavic is believed to have been spoken uniformly from Thessaloniki to Novgorod.

== Notation ==
See Proto-Balto-Slavic language#Notation for much more detail on the uses of the most commonly encountered diacritics for indicating prosody (á, à, â, ã, ȁ, a̋, ā, ă) and various other phonetic distinctions (ą, ẹ, ė, š, ś, etc.) in different Balto-Slavic languages.

=== Vowel notation ===
Two different and conflicting systems for denoting vowels are commonly in use in Indo-European and Balto-Slavic linguistics on the one hand, and Slavic linguistics on the other. In the first, vowel length is consistently distinguished with a macron above the letter, while in the latter it is not clearly indicated. The following table explains these differences:

Vowel	IE/B-S	Slavic
Short front closed vowel (front yer)	i	ĭ or ь
Short back closed vowel (back yer)	u	ŭ or ъ
Short back open vowel	a	o
Long front closed vowel	ī	i
Long back closed vowel	ū	y
Long front open vowel (yat)	ē	ě
Long back open vowel	ā	a

For consistency, all discussions of sounds up to (but not including) Middle Common Slavic use the common Balto-Slavic notation of vowels, while discussions of Middle and Late Common Slavic (the phonology and grammar sections) and later dialects use the Slavic notation.

=== Other vowel and consonant diacritics ===
Other marks used within Balto-Slavic and Slavic linguistics are:

- The haček on consonants (č š ž), indicating a "hushing" quality [tʃ ʃ ʒ], as in English kitchen, mission, vision.
- Various strongly palatal or palatalized consonants (a more "hissing" quality) usually indicated by an acute accent (ć ǵ ḱ ĺ ń ŕ ś ź) or a haček (ď ľ ň ř ť).
- The ogonek (ą ę ǫ), indicating vowel nasalization (in modern standard Lithuanian this is historic only).

=== Prosodic notation ===
For Middle and Late Common Slavic, the following marks are used to indicate prosodic distinctions, based on the standard notation in Serbo-Croatian:

- Long rising (á): This indicates the Balto-Slavic acute accent in Middle Common Slavic only.
- Short rising (à): This indicates the Balto-Slavic acute accent in Late Common Slavic, where it was shortened.
- Long falling (ȃ): This normally indicates the Balto-Slavic circumflex accent. In Late Common Slavic, it also indicates originally short (falling) accent that was lengthened in monosyllables. This secondary circumflex occurs only on the short vowels e, o, ь, ъ in an open syllable (i.e. when not forming part of a liquid diphthong).
- Short falling (ȁ): This indicates the Balto-Slavic short accent. In Late Common Slavic, this accent was lengthened in monosyllables (see preceding entry).
- Neoacute (ã): This indicates the Late Common Slavic neoacute accent, which was pronounced as a rising accent, usually long but short when occurring on some syllable types in certain languages. This results from retraction of the accent, i.e. the Middle Common Slavic accent fell on the following syllable (usually specifically a weak yer).

=== Other prosodic diacritics ===
There are multiple competing systems used to indicate prosody in different Balto-Slavic languages (see Proto-Balto-Slavic language#Notation for more details). The most important for this article are:

1. Three-way system of Proto-Slavic, Proto-Balto-Slavic, modern Lithuanian: Acute tone (á) vs. circumflex tone (ȃ or ã) vs. short accent (à).
2. Four-way Serbo-Croatian system, also used in Slovene and often in Slavic reconstructions: long rising (á), short rising (à), long falling (ȃ), short falling (ȁ). In the Chakavian dialect and other archaic dialects, the long rising accent is notated with a tilde (ã), indicating its normal origin in the Late Common Slavic neoacute accent (see above).
3. Length only, as in Czech and Slovak: long (á) vs. short (a).
4. Stress only, as in Russian, Ukrainian and Bulgarian: stressed (á) vs. unstressed (a).

== Dialectal differentiation ==
The breakup of Common Slavic was gradual and many sound changes (such as the second regressive palatalization) still propagated throughout what must have been by then a dialect continuum. However, several changes were more restricted, or had different outcomes.

The end of the Common Slavic period occurred with the loss of the yers (weak high vowels, derived from Proto-Balto-Slavic and ultimately Proto-Indo-European *i and *u). This ended the era of syllabic synharmony (when most, originally all, syllables were open) by creating large numbers of closed syllables. The conditions for which yers were strong and which ones weak is the same across most or all Slavic languages, but the particular outcomes are drastically different.

The clusters *tl and *dl were lost in all but West Slavic, being normally simplified to *l. Exceptions are some Northern Russian dialects where they instead changed to *kl and *gl respectively (today only traces of this remain) and the Gail Valley dialect of Slovene (with traces in other Carinthian dialects).

For many Common Slavic dialects—including most of West Slavic, all but the northernmost portions of East Slavic, and some western parts of South Slavic—Proto-Slavic *g lenited from a voiced velar plosive to a voiced velar fricative ([ɡ] → [ɣ]). This remains in some modern languages: for example, Czech and Slovak hlava /ɦlava/, Belarusian галава́ /ɣalaˈva/, Ukrainian голова́ /ɦoloˈwa/, which developed from Proto-Slavic *golvà. Because this change was not universal and because it did not occur for a number of East Slavic dialects (such as Belarusian and South Russian) until after the application of Havlík's law, Shevelov (1977) calls into question early projections of this change and postulates three independent instigations of lenition, dating the earliest to before 900 CE and the latest to the early thirteenth century.

=== Overview of languages ===
The Slavic languages are generally divided into East Slavic, South Slavic and West Slavic. For most comparative purposes, however, South Slavic does not function as a unit. Bulgarian and Macedonian, while quite similar to each other, are radically different from the other South Slavic languages in phonology and grammar. The phonology of Bulgarian and Macedonian is similar to East Slavic rather than their nearest Slavic neighbor Serbo-Croatian (suggesting an early East–West divide across the whole Slavic territory, before South Slavic was separated from the rest of the Slavic languages by the spread of Hungarian and Romanian). In grammar, Bulgarian and Macedonian have developed distinctly from all other Slavic languages, eliminating nearly all case distinctions (strongly preserved elsewhere), but preserving and even strengthening the older Indo-European aspectual system consisting of synthetic aorist and imperfect tenses (largely eliminated elsewhere in favor of the new Slavic aspectual system).

Old Church Slavonic (OCS) data are especially important for the reconstruction of Late Common Slavic (LCS). The major exception is LCS accent, which can only be reconstructed from modern Slavic dialects.

=== Palatalization ===
At least six separate sound changes involving palatalization can be identified in the history of the Slavic languages:

1. Satemization, which converted Proto-Indo-European (PIE) front velars *ḱ, *ǵ, *ǵh into Balto-Slavic *ś, *ź, *ź, and further into Slavic *s, *z, *z.
2. The first regressive palatalization of velars.
3. The second regressive palatalization of velars.
4. The progressive palatalization of velars.
5. Iotation, which palatalized all consonants before *j.
6. General palatalization of all consonants before front vowels (not in all languages).

The first palatalization (satemization) is reflected in all Balto-Slavic languages, while the rest are represented in nearly all Slavic languages. (The Old Novgorod dialect did not undergo the second regressive palatalization, and underwent the progressive palatalization only partly.)

==== Velar palatalization outcomes ====
The outcome of the first regressive palatalization is uniform across all Slavic languages, showing that it happened fairly early. The outcome of the second regressive palatalization shows more variety. It is possible, however, that this is a later development. Many authors reconstruct a uniform outcome *ś, which only later resolves into *s or *š. (According to Aleksandar Belić, the phonetic character of the palatalizations was uniform throughout Common Slavic and West Slavic languages developed *š later on by analogy.) In all dialects (except for Lechitic), [dz] was deaffricated to [z], but [dz] is still found in a few of the earlier Old Church Slavonic texts, where it is represented by the special letter Dze (Ѕ).

The following table illustrates the differences between the different dialects as far as phonetic realization of the three velar palatalizations:

		1st regressive			2nd regressive, Progressive		
Pre-Slavic		k	g	x	k	g	x
Common Slavic		č	ž	š	c	dz	ś
East Slavic		č	ž	š	c	z	s
South Slavic		č	ž	š	c	z	s
West Slavic	Lechitic	č	ž	š	c	dz	š
West Slavic	Other	č	ž	š	c	z	š

Some dialects (in particular South Slavic), allowed the second regressive palatalization to occur across an intervening *v. For example, Early Common Slavic *gvaizdā "star", which developed into Middle-Late Common Slavic *gvězda:

- palatalized:
  - Russian: звезда [zvʲɪˈzda]
  - Slovene: zvézda [ˈzʋèːzda]
  - Serbo-Croatian: zvijezda [ˈzʋiěːzda] / zvézda [ˈzʋěːzda]
  - Bulgarian: звезда [zvɛzˈda]
  - Macedonian: ѕвезда [ˈdzvɛzda]
- unpalatalized:
  - Polish: gwiazda [ˈɡvʲazda]
  - Czech: hvězda [ˈɦvjezda]

==== Iotation outcomes ====
The outcomes of most cases of iotation are the same in all Slavic languages; for the chart of outcomes, see Iotation#Sound change.

The phonemes *ť (from earlier *tj and *gt/kt) and *ď (from earlier *dj) generally merged into various other phonemes in the various Slavic languages, but they merged with different ones in each, showing that this was still a separate phoneme in Proto-Slavic. Compare:

	Proto-Slavic	OCS	Bulg.	Mac.	S-C	Slvn.	Czech	Slvk.	Pol.	Bel.	Ukr.	Rusyn	Russ.
Written	*ť	št	št	ḱ	ć	č	c	c	c	č	č	č	č
IPA	*c(ː)	ʃt	ʃt	c	t͡ɕ	t͡ʃ	t͡s	t͡s	t͡s	t͡ʂ	t͡ʃ	t͡ɕ	t͡ɕ
Written	*ď	žd	žd	ǵ	đ	j	z	dz	dz	ž	ž	ž	ž
IPA	*ɟ(ː)	ʒd	ʒd	ɟ	d͡ʑ	j	z	d͡z	d͡z	ʐ	ʒ	ʒ	ʐ

The exact pronunciation of *ť and *ď in Proto-Slavic is unclear, but they may have sounded as geminate palatal stops /cː/ and /ɟː/.

The OCS and Bulgarian outcome is somewhat unusual as it is not an affricate but rather a fricative followed by a stop, having undergone metathesis. In Macedonian, the outcome is non-sibilant.

In Proto-Slavic, iotated *ľ *ň *ř contrasted with non-iotated *l *n *r, including before front vowels. This distinction was still apparent in Old Church Slavonic, although they aren't always consistently marked (least for *ř, which may have already been merging with *r' at the time the Old Church Slavonic manuscripts were written or copied). In Southwest Slavic (modern Serbo-Croatian and Slovene), this contrast remains to this day. In the other Slavic variants, however, regular *l *n *r developed palatalised variants before front vowels, and these merged with the existing iotated *ľ *ň *ř.

==== General palatalization ====
In most languages (but not Serbo-Croatian or Slovene), a general palatalization of consonants before front vowels (including the front yer ь), as well as of *r in *ьr, occurred at the end of the Common Slavic period, shortly before the loss of weak yers. The loss of the weak yers made these sounds phonemic, nearly doubling the number of phonemes present. The already palatal or palatalized sounds — the outcomes of the velar palatalizations and iotation — were unchanged. Newly palatalized sounds *l' *n' *r' merged with palatal *ľ *ň *ř from iotation. However, newly palatalized *t' *d' *s' *z' did not usually merge with existing *ť *ď (from iotation) or *č *š *(d)ž (from the first palatalization of velars).

The new sounds were later depalatalized to varying degrees in all Slavic languages, merging back into the corresponding non-palatal sound. This has happened the least in Russian and Polish: before another consonant, except for l', which was always preserved, as in сколько skol'ko "how many", and dentals before labials, as in тьма t'ma / ćma "darkness", and before a pause for labials. r' was depalatalized early before dentals, as in чёрт čort / czart "devil", but otherwise has been preserved in Polish and in many Russian dialects, as well as for some older standard speakers, who pronounce верх as ver'h (cf. Polish wierzch). In many cases palatalization was analogically restored later, particularly in Russian. Russian has also introduced an unusual four-way distinction between non-palatal C, palatal C', the sequence C'j of palatal + /j/ (from Common Slavic *Cьj with weak ь), and the sequence Cj of non-palatal + /j/ (only across a clear morpheme boundary, when a prefix is followed by a morpheme-initial /j/); however, only dentals show a clear contrast before j.

Czech underwent a general depalatalization in the 13th century. It might be argued that Czech never underwent palatalization at all in most cases, but the Czech sound ř (an unusual fricative trill) is found everywhere that *r followed by a front vowel is reconstructed in Late Common Slavic. This suggests that former *r' escaped depalatalization because it had evolved into a new sound — no longer paired with a corresponding non-palatal sound — by the time that depalatalization occurred.

The same thing happened more broadly in Polish — paired palatalized sounds occur only before vowels, but original *r' *l' *t' *d' *s' *z' are reflected differently from *r *l *t *d *s *z even word-finally and before consonants, because all six pairs had diverged by the time any depalatalization occurred. *r' evolved as in Czech, later becoming /ʐ/, but still written rz. *t' *d' *s' *z' evolved into alveolopalatal consonants; and in the case of *l', non-palatal *l evolved into a back velar /ɫ/ and then further into /w/, still written ł.

In Bulgarian, distinctively palatalized consonants are found only before /a o u/. Velars are allophonically palatalized before front vowels in standard Bulgarian; the same thing happens to all consonants in Eastern Bulgarian.

Palatalization triggered a general merger of Common Slavic *y and *i. In East Slavic and Polish, the two sounds became allophones, with [ɨ] occurring after non-palatal sounds and [i] after palatal or palatalized sounds. In Czech, Slovak and South Slavic, the two sounds merged entirely (although in Czech, *i triggered palatalization of t d n prior to the merger, and in Slovak, it triggered palatalization of t d n l).

Researchers differ in whether the paired palatalized consonants should be analyzed as separate phonemes. Almost all analyses of Russian posit phonemic palatalized consonants due to their occurrence word-finally and before consonants, and due to the phonemic distinction between /C'/ and /C'j/. In Polish and Bulgarian, however, many researchers treat some or all paired palatalized consonants as underlying sequences of non-palatal consonant + /j/. Researchers who do this in Polish also generally treat the sounds [ɨ] and [i] as separate phonemes.

=== The yers ь and ъ ===
==== Strong vs. weak yers ====
The two vowels ь and ъ, known as (front and back) yer, were originally pronounced as short high vowels. During the late Proto-Slavic period, a pattern emerged in these vowels which characterised a yer as either "strong" or "weak". This change is known as Havlík's law. A yer at the end of a word, or preceding a strong yer or non-yer vowel was weak, and a yer followed by a weak yer became strong. The pattern created sequences of alternating strong and weak yers within each word: in a sequence of yers, every odd yer encountered was weak, every even yer was strong.

The name *sъmolьnьskъ (the Russian city of Smolensk) is shown here as an example, with strong yers in bold and weak yers in italics.

- Nominative singular: *sъmolьn**ь**skъ
- Genitive singular: *sъmol**ь**nьska

During the time immediately following the Common Slavic period, weak yers were gradually deleted. A deleted front yer ь often left palatalization of the preceding consonant as a trace. Strong yers underwent lowering and became mid vowels, but the outcomes differ somewhat across the various Slavic languages. Slovene in particular retains a distinct outcome that did not merge with any other vowels, albeit originally only in unstressed syllables, and Bulgarian has an outcome that merged only with nasal ǫ.

Compare:

Proto-Slavic	OCS	Bulg.	Mac.	S-C	Slvn.	Czech	Slvk.	Pol.	USorb	LSorb	Bel.	Russ.	Ukr.
strong *ь	ь	e, ă	e	a	ǝ,a	e	e (a,á,o)	'e	e	e	'e	'e	e
strong *ъ	ъ	ă	o	a	ǝ,a	e	o (e,a,á)	e	e	e	o	o	o

- An apostrophe indicates palatalization of the preceding consonant.
- The front and back strong yers merged in Serbo-Croatian, Slovene, Czech and Upper and Lower Sorbian.
- In Slovene, /a/ arose from this merged result when stressed, /ə/ otherwise. /a/ was later often replaced by /ə/ analogically.
- In Central (standard) Slovak, the normal outcomes of *ь *ъ are e o, but various other sounds often appear, unpredictably. In East and West Slovak dialects, both yers merge and become e, as in Czech.

==== Examples ====
Examples (nom. and gen. sg. given except as indicated)
	"dog"	"day"	"dream"	"moss"
Middle Proto-Slavic	*pьsъ̏ ~ *pьsá	*dь̏nь ~ *dь̏ne	*sъnъ̏ ~ *sъná	*mъ̏xъ/mъxъ̏ ~ *mъxá/mъ̏xa
Late Proto-Slavic	*pь̃sъ ~ *pьsà	*dь̑nь ~ *dьnȅ	*sъ̃nъ ~ *sъnà	*mъ̂xъ/mъ̃xъ ~ *mъxà/*mъxȁ
Bulgarian	pes ~ pséta, pésove (pl.)	den ~ déna, dni (pl.)	săn ~ sắništa (pl.)	măx ~ mắxa, mắxove (pl.)
Serbo-Croatian	pȁs ~ psȁ	dȃn ~ dȃna	sȁn ~ snȁ	mȃh ~ mȁha
Slovene	pǝ̀s ~ psà	dȃn ~ dnẹ̑/dnẹ̑va	sǝ̀n ~ snà	mȃh ~ mȃha/mahȗ; mèh ~ méha
Macedonian	pes ~ pl. pci, pcišta	den ~ pl. denovi, dni	son ~ pl. soništa, sništa	mov (uncount. n.)
Russian	p'os (< p'es) ~ psa	d'en' ~ dn'a	son ~ sna	mox ~ mxa/móxa
Czech	pes ~ psa	den ~ dne	sen ~ snu	mech ~ mechu
Slovak	pes ~ psa	deň ~ dňa	sen ~ sna	mach ~ machu
Ukrainian	pes ~ psa	den' ~ dn'a	son ~ snu	moh ~ mohu
Polish	pies ~ psa	dzień ~ dnia	sen ~ snu	mech ~ mchu

==== Clusters and fill vowels ====
Deletion of weak yers created many new closed syllables as well as many of the unusual consonant clusters that characterize the Slavic languages today. Many cases of "spurious vowels" also appeared because a yer had been weak in one form of a word but strong in another, causing it to disappear in some forms of the word but not others. For example, the word for "dog" was *pьsъ in the nominative singular, but *pьsa in the genitive singular, with differing patterns of strong and weak yers. Following the deletion of weak yers and lowering of strong yers, this resulted in nominative Czech pes, Polish pies, Serbo-Croatian pas, but genitive psa (in all three).

In some cases, however, deletion of weak yers would lead to an awkward consonant cluster such as word-initial rt-, ln- or mx- (as in the example of *mъxъ "moss" above), with a sonorant consonant on the outside of the cluster, a violation of the principle of rising sonority. These clusters were handled in various ways:

- Allow them to exist unchanged. This happened especially in Russian and Polish.
- Convert the weak yer into a strong one, thereby breaking up the consonant cluster. This happened most consistently in Serbo-Croatian.
- Convert the sonorant into a syllabic sonorant. This happened with initial r in Serbo-Croatian and Macedonian.
- Insert a prothetic vowel before the cluster. This happened in some dialects of Belarusian, e.g. lënu ~ l'nu ~ il'nú "flax (gen. sg.)" (Common Slavic *lьnu).

A similar problem occurred with awkward word-final clusters such as -tr, -gn or -sm. These originated from words like *větrъ "wind" or *ognь "fire", where the cluster occurred syllable-initially and there was no sonority violation. Again various outcomes are found in different languages, largely parallel to the above outcomes for word-initial clusters. In this case, when a cluster needed to be broken up, a strong yer was inserted as a fill vowel between the two consonants.

==== Tense yers ====
Yers before /j/ are known as tense yers and were handled specially. In languages other than Russian, they were sometimes raised, with *ьj *ъj becoming *ij *yj regardless of position. In Russian, the opposite sometimes happened, with *ij *yj sometimes lowering to *ьj *ъj, subsequently evolving normally as strong or weak yers. In languages other than Russian, resulting sequences of *ijV or *yjV may contract to a single vowel (especially in Czech). The outcomes are not consistent and depend on various factors. For example, *ъj in long adjectives becomes contracted í in Czech, but stressed oj, unstressed yj (ăj in the old literary pronunciation and some dialects) in Russian.

In Russian, when the yer in *ьj was weak, the result was a sequence of palatal consonant + /j/, which remained distinct from regular palatal consonants. In other languages, either the sequence compressed into a single palatal consonant or the palatal consonant was depalatalized. E.g. from Common Slavic *ustьje "estuary", when the yer was treated as weak the result is Russian úst'e [ˈustʲje], Polish ujście [ujɕtɕe], Slovene ûstje; when treated as strong, the result is Czech ústí (with contraction of *ije), Bulgarian ústie [ˈustie].

=== The liquid diphthongs ===
Proto-Slavic had eliminated most diphthongs creating either long monophthongs or nasal vowels. But it still possessed sequences of a short vowel followed by *l or *r and another consonant, the so-called "liquid diphthongs". These sequences went counter to the law of open syllables and were eliminated by the end of the Proto-Slavic period, but differently in each dialect.

==== Mid vowels ====
The situation for the mid vowels *e and *o is relatively straightforward. The South Slavic dialects used metathesis: the liquid and vowel switched places, and the vowels were lengthened to *ě and *a respectively. The East Slavic languages instead underwent a process known as pleophony: a copy of the vowel before the liquid consonant was inserted after it. However, *el became *olo rather than *ele. The situation in West Slavic is more mixed. Czech and Slovak follow the South Slavic pattern and have metathesis with lengthening. Polish and Sorbian underwent metathesis but without any lengthening, and the northwestern Lechitic languages (Pomeranian, Slovincian and Polabian) retained *or without any metathesis at all.

Proto-Slavic	OCS	Bulg.	Mac.	S-C	Slvn.	Czech	Slvk.	Pol.	Kash.	Bel.	Russ.	Ukr.
*el	lě	le/lja	le	lije/le/li	le	le	lie	le	le	olo	olo	olo, oli
*ol	la	la	la	la	la	la	la	ło	ło	olo	olo	olo, oli
*er	rě	re/rja	re	rije/re/ri	re	ře	rie	rze	rze	ere	ere	ere
*or	ra	ra	ra	ra	ra	ra	ra	ro	ar	oro	oro	oro, ori

1. The variants le/lja, re/rja in Bulgarian, and lije/le/li, rije/re/ri in Serbo-Croatian, are dialectal differences.
2. The variants oli, ori in Ukrainian are due to a sound change *ō > /i/, where *o was lengthened before a lost yer under certain accentual conditions.

==== High vowels ====
The evolution of the liquid diphthongs with high vowels in the various daughter languages is more diverse. In some West Slavic and South Slavic languages, syllabic sonorants appear, and in others (e.g. Polish), either vowel-consonant or consonant-vowel sequences appear depending on the context, which is most easily derived by assuming an earlier stage with syllabic sonorants (with the former occurrence of ь or ъ transferred into palatalization or lack thereof). East Slavic, however, consistently has vowel-consonant sequences with e or o as the vowel, which can be easily derived by assuming that the liquid diphthongs continued unchanged until the changes involving yers (assuming that the yers in these sequences were always treated as if strong).

As a result, there is a divergence of opinion, with some scholars assuming that the high-vowel liquid diphthongs evolved into syllabic sonorants early in the Common Slavic period (even before the metathesis of the mid-vowel liquid diphthongs), while others assume that the change to syllabic sonorants was one of the last changes in the Common Slavic period and did not occur at all in many languages (e.g. East Slavic).

Old Church Slavonic writes these as *lь, *lъ, *rь, *rъ, as if metathesis had occurred. However, various internal evidence indicates that these behaved differently from original Proto-Slavic *lь, *lъ, *rь, *rъ, and hence were probably actually pronounced as syllabic sonorants. (This is also consistent with evidence from later languages.) In the manuscripts, only a single vowel is found in this position, usually *ъ but also consistently *ь in a few manuscripts. This appears to indicate that the palatal(ized) syllabic sonorants had merged into the non-palatal ones.

The syllabic sonorants are retained unchanged in Czech and Slovak. In Macedonian, Serbo-Croatian and Slovene, syllabic r is retained but an epenthetic vowel was inserted before syllabic l. Bulgarian inserted an epenthetic ǎ before both. Serbo-Croatian also underwent l-vocalization.

East Slavic reflects original *ьr and *ъr as er and or respectively, but merges *ьl and *ъl as ol (Proto-Slavic *vьlna > East Slavic вълна > Russian волна), similarly to the merger of *el and *ol as olo. L-vocalization later occurred in Belarusian and Ukrainian: for example, Proto-Slavic *vь̑lkъ > Old East Slavic вълкъ > Ukrainian вовк /wowk/, Belarusian воўк /vowk/.

=== The nasal vowels ę and ǫ ===
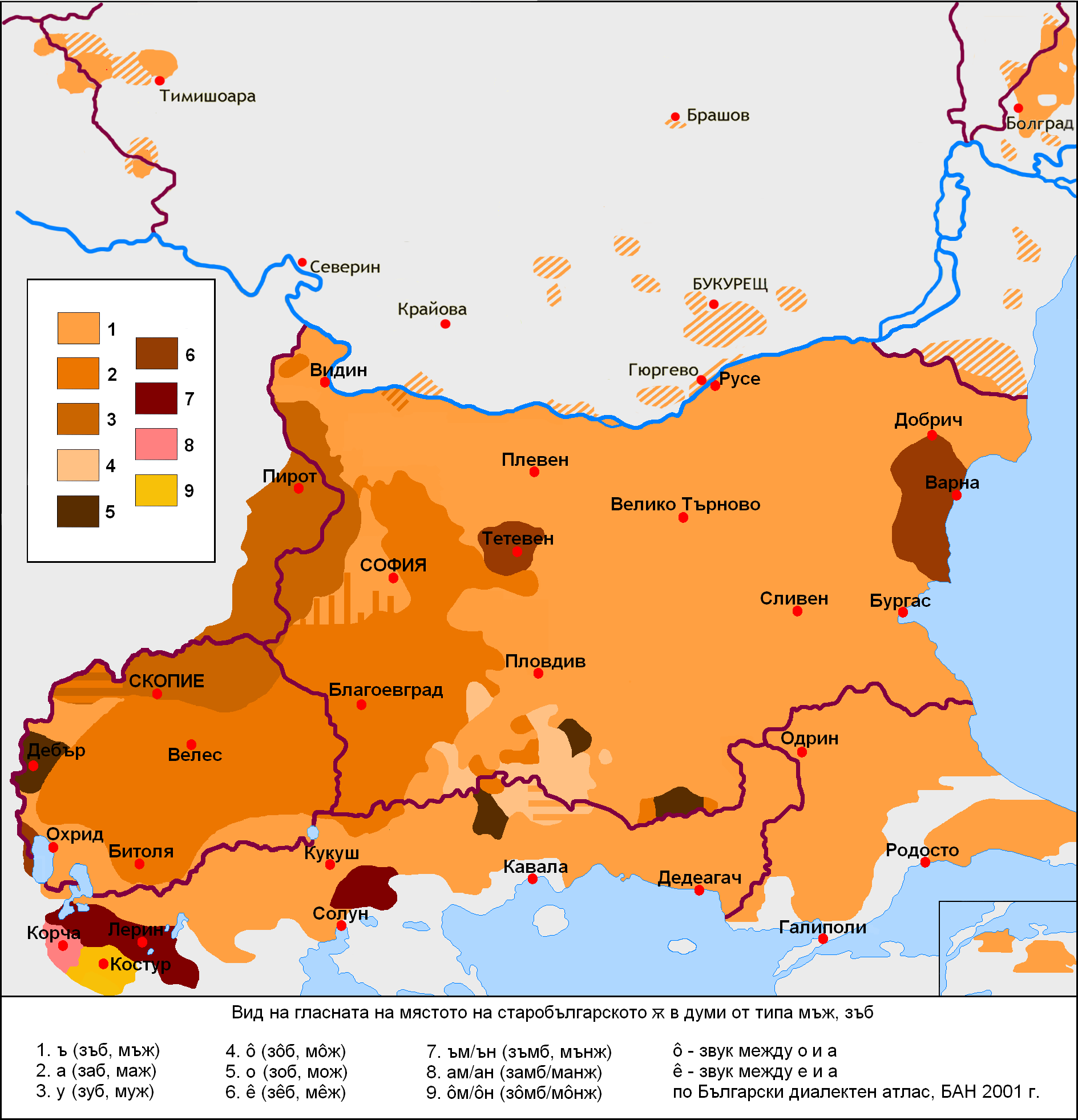
Main outcomes of the ǫ vowel in Eastern South Slavic dialects

Nasal vowels were initially retained in most Slavic dialects, but soon underwent further changes. Nasality is preserved in modern Polish, as well as in some peripheral dialects of Slovene (e.g. the Carinthian dialect group) and Bulgarian/Macedonian (e.g. around Thessaloniki and Kastoria). In other Slavic languages, however, the nasal vowels lost their nasality and merged with other vowels. The outcomes are as follows:

Proto-Slavic	OCS	Bulg.	Mac.	S-C	Slvn.	Czech	Slvk.	Pol.	Bel.	Russ.	Ukr.
*ę	ę	e	ja, e	e	ẹ̄	a, ě	a, ä	ię	ja	ja	ja
*ę̄	ę̄	e	ja, e	ē	ẹ̄	á, í	ia	ią	ja	ja	ja
*ǫ	ǫ	ǎ	ja, a	u	ọ̄	u	u	ę	u	u	u
*ǭ	ǭ	ǎ	ja, a	ū	ọ̄	ou	ú	ą	u	u	u

1. Long and short nasal vowels developed primarily from accentual differences. The neoacute accent always produced long vowels, but the outcome of the other accents (circumflex and old acute) depended on the dialect. See above for more details.
2. The two outcomes listed in Czech occurred in hard and soft environments, respectively. "Hard environment" means preceding a hard (neither palatal nor palatalized) alveolar consonant.
3. In Slovak, short *ę > ä after labials, else a.
4. In Polish, original *ę and *ǫ can only be distinguished because the former palatalized the preceding consonant.
5. The two outcomes listed in Macedonian occurred in initial and non-initial environments, respectively.

=== The yat vowel ě ===
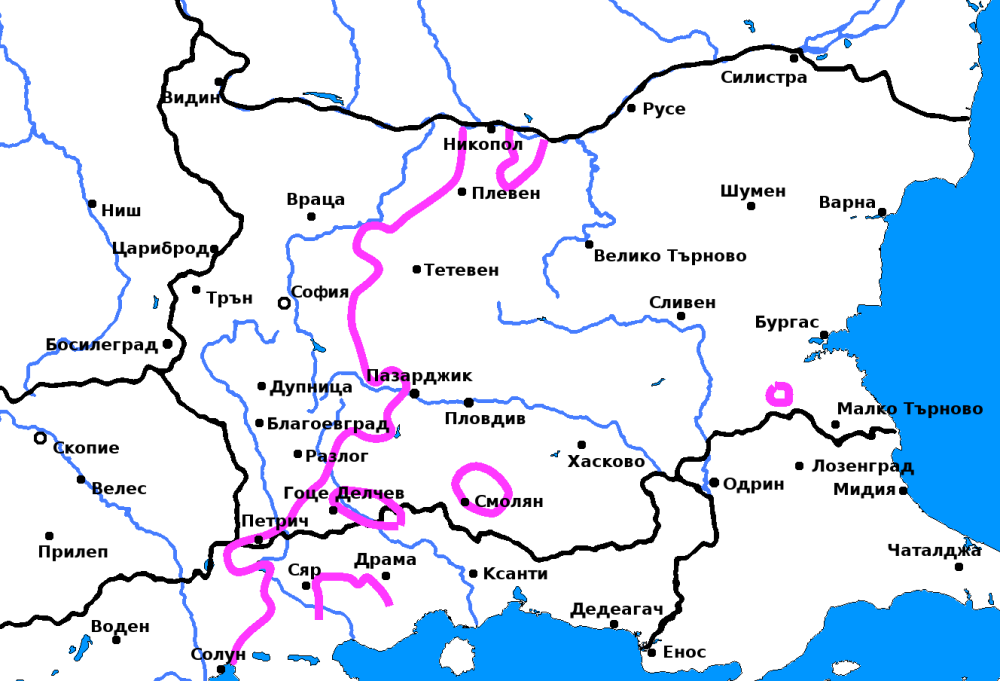
Yat border

The phonetic realization of *ě was also subject to phonetic variation across different dialects. In Early Proto-Slavic, *ě was originally distinguished from *e primarily by length. Later on, it appears that initially it was lowered to a low-front vowel [æ] and then diphthongized to something like [iæ]. This is still reflected as ia or ja (i.e. /a/ with palatalization of the previous consonant) in certain contexts before hard consonants in Bulgarian and Polish; but in most areas it was raised to [ie]. This generally proceeded further in one of three directions:

1. Remain as a diphthong.
2. Simplify to [e].
3. Simplify to [i].

All three possibilities are found as variants within the Serbo-Croatian area, respectively known as the ijekavian, ekavian and ikavian dialects. An ijekavian dialect served as the basis of almost all the literary Serbo-Croatian forms (all except literary Serbian as used specifically within Serbia itself, which is ekavian). These dialects have short je, long ije (often pronounced as [jeː]). The ijekavian dialects of Serbo-Croatian are in fact the only Slavic languages that consistently preserve a reflex of *ě distinct from all other Common Slavic sounds. (Elsewhere, at most only some cases of *ě, e.g. those in stressed syllables, have a distinct reflex.)

In cases where the reflex has remained as a diphthong, it has most commonly developed to [je], often followed by merger of the [j] with a previous consonant to form a palatal or palatalized consonant. In Czech, for example, the reflex of *ě is sometimes still spelled ě, but this in fact indicates [je] after labials, and [e] after t d n, which become pronounced as palatal sounds [c ɟ ɲ]; in other cases the reflex is simply e.

In Old Russian, the reflex of *ě simplified to [e], but this did not cause a merger with *e in stressed syllables, which was pronounced [ɛ]. Later, this /ɛ/ (also including reflexes of the strong front yer) changed into /jo/ (i.e. /o/ with palatalization of the preceding consonant) when not followed by a palatalized consonant: cf. modern Russian лёд /lʲod/ 'ice' (loans from Church Slavonic do not display this change: небо "sky", крест "cross", перст "finger" in elevated style). The result of the sound change may be expressed in the present-day spelling by means of a diaeresis over the letter e (ё), but generally isn't. In contrast, the sound change did not affect the reflex of original yat, which continued to be pronounced as [e], eventually merging with the surviving unaffected instances of /ɛ/ as late as the 1700s (seen, respectively, in the words хлеб /xlʲeb/ 'bread' and печь /pʲet͡ɕ/ 'oven'). Original yat continued to be represented distinctly from /e/ resulting from other sources in spelling until the spelling reforms of 1918, and is still distinguished in some Northern Russian dialects.

Similarly, in Ukrainian, the reflex of *ě simplified to i [i], but this did not cause a merger with either *e or *i in stressed syllables, because both sounds developed to a phoneme y [ɪ]. (However, in some instances, former *o is also reflected as i.)

The following table shows the development of *ě in various languages:

Proto-Slavic	OCS	Bulg.	Mac.	S-C	Slvn.	Czech	Slvk.	Pol.	Bel.	Russ.	Ukr.
*ě	ě	ja/e	e	(i)je, e, i	е	ě, í	(i)e	ie, ia	e	e	i

- Bulgarian (apart from the Western Bulgarian dialects) has ja only when stressed and before a (formerly) hard consonant, e otherwise (e.g. *tělo "body" produces singular тя́ло tjálo and plural тела́ telá).
- Macedonian (and the Western Bulgarian dialects) has only e. The reflex between the Bulgarian and Macedonian versions forms an important isogloss known as the jat' border, running approximately from Nikopol on the Danube to Solun (Thessaloniki) on the Aegean Sea.
- Serbo-Croatian shows great dialectal diversity; see above.
- Polish has ia before a (formerly) hard dental, ie otherwise.
- Some Northern Russian dialects have *ě > i, as in Ukrainian.
- Some Ukrainian dialects, as well as some Northern Russian sub-dialects, preserve an earlier form /i̯e/.
- Slovak has short e, long ie.

=== Accent ===
==== Modern prosodic phenomena ====
The modern Slavic languages differ greatly in the occurrence of the prosodic phenomena of phonemic vowel length, accent and tone, all of which existed in Common Slavic (CS), ranging from total preservation (Serbo-Croatian) to total loss (Polish). However, the surface occurrence of length, accent and/or tone in a given language does not necessarily correspond with the extent to which the corresponding CS phenomena can be reconstructed. For example, although all of the standard Serbo-Croatian literary forms have phonemic tone, they cannot be used to reconstruct Late CS tone; only some of the non-standard dialects (e.g. Chakavian) are useful in this regard. Similarly, although Macedonian has (marginal) phonemic accent, this does not continue the CS accent position. Contrariwise, although modern Polish lacks vowel length, some vowel quality differences (e.g. in nasal vowels) reflect former length differences.

Phonemic tone is found only in western South Slavic languages — Serbo-Croatian and some Slovene dialects (including one of the two literary standards). Phonemic length is found in Serbo-Croatian, Slovene, Czech and Slovak. Phonemic accent is found in Serbo-Croatian, Slovene, the East Slavic languages, Bulgarian, the northern Kashubian dialects, marginally in Macedonian.

In terms of which modern languages preserve which CS prosodic features, it is important to understand that length, tone and accent are intricately tied together. Middle CS did not have phonemic length, and Late CS length evolved largely from certain tonal and accentual changes. (In addition, some long vowels evolved from contraction of vowels across /j/ or compensatory lengthening before a lost yer, especially in Czech and Slovak.) Hence length distinctions in some languages (e.g. Czech) may correspond to tonal distinctions in other languages (e.g. Serbo-Croatian).

==== Development from Common Slavic ====
As mentioned above, Middle Common Slavic (MCS) had a three-way tonal/length distinction on accented syllables (long rising, long falling, short). Long rising and falling tones continue Balto-Slavic acute and circumflex, respectively. Late Common Slavic (LCS) developed at first a four-way distinction, where rising and falling tones could occur in both short and long syllables, as in modern Serbo-Croatian. Later changes of a complex nature produced the prosodic phenomena found in the various modern languages.

In general, the history of Slavic accentuation is extremely complex and still incompletely understood. The following is a summary of the most important changes in LCS:

1. Short-accented syllables develop into specifically short falling syllables.
2. Long rising (acute) syllables are shortened, becoming short rising.
3. The accent is retracted (moved a syllable towards the beginning) in certain cases, e.g. when it fell on a weak yer (Ivšić's law). The new syllables developed a rising accent, termed the neoacute. When this accent fell on short *e and *o, they were lengthened, except in Serbo-Croatian and Slovene. At this stage, most neoacute syllables remained separate from original acute syllables because of the difference in length (long vs. short, respectively).
4. Initial short falling syllables followed by a final weak yer (i.e. words which will be monosyllabic upon loss of the yer and which in MCS had a short accent on the initial syllable) are lengthened. Such syllables become long falling (although this doesn't cause a merger with original long falling syllables because the two differ in vowel quality, i.e. *e *o *ь *ъ vs. other qualities). This is hypothesized to be pan-Slavic, but only visible in Serbo-Croatian and Slovene because of the following step.
5. Long falling syllables are shortened everywhere except in Serbo-Croatian and Slovene. This undoes the previous step (if it occurred at all) and is responsible for MCS circumflex accent appearing as a short vowel in Czech, Slovak, Old Polish, etc.
6. Compensatory lengthening of some short syllables occurs in some languages when immediately followed by a weak yer. This does not occur in South Slavic, nor in Russian. It is most common in words that will become monosyllabic after the loss of the yer. In Ukrainian, it is general in this position, while in Czech and Polish it is common but inconsistent. It results in a Czech and Polish pattern in masculine nouns in which long vowels in the nominative singular alternate with short vowels in the other case/number forms. This pattern is then often analogically extended to other words.
7. Weak yers are lost.
8. Short rising syllables (arising mostly from MCS acute accent) are relengthened in East Slavic, Bulgarian and Macedonian. It also occurs in Czech and Slovene in the initial syllable of disyllabic words, under certain conditions. This causes a general merger of MCS acute and neoacute in the East Slavic and eastern South Slavic languages, leading to a two-way distinction of short falling vs. long rising. (This distinction is later lost, but revealed in some traces; see below.)

Note that steps 3, 4 and 6 can all be viewed as types of compensatory lengthening before a lost (or about-to-be-lost) yer.

Numerous further developments occur in individual languages. Some of the most notable ones are:

- In East Slavic, Bulgarian and Macedonian, the pitch accent is converted into a stress accent (as in English), and vowel length and tone are lost. Traces of these distinctions exist in a few circumstances:
  - Vowel length in early borrowings of Slavic words, e.g. into Finnish.
  - The position of the accent in original liquid diphthongs in East Slavic, when the vowel of the diphthong was o or e. Such sequences develop into bisyllabic sequences with -oro-, -ere- or -olo-. A short falling accent (MCS circumflex) is reflected as -óro- etc., while a long rising accent (MCS acute and LCS neoacute) produces -oró- etc.
  - Words with a short falling vowel (MCS circumflex) tend to lose the accent to attached prefixes or clitics (e.g. the definite article added onto the end of Bulgarian and Macedonian words).
  - In East Slavic, stressed long *ō was raised to /⁽ᵘ⁾o/ (notated ô), while all other *o remained as /ɔ/. This is still reflected in some Northern Russian dialects.
- In some dialects of Macedonian, stress occurring on suffixes is moved onto the stem, but may otherwise appear on any syllable, while in others, including standard Macedonian, lexical stress accent is lost and replaced with fixed stress.
- Phonemic tone and accent are lost in West Slavic (although some dialects of the Kashubian language maintain phonemic stress accent). Phonemic length is eventually lost in Polish, although still present in Old Polish. In Polish, some former long/short pairs have evolved to different sounds; e.g. *ō > ó [u]. Similarly, nasal ę reflects a former short nasal, while ą reflects a long nasal. (The two original nasals *ę and *ǫ merged in Polish.)
- In the original eastern Serbo-Croatian dialects, phonemic tone is lost, with all accented syllables essentially gaining a falling tone. Later on, in a subset of these dialects (the neoshtokavian dialects, the basis of all standard Serbo-Croatian registers), the stress is retracted one syllable when possible, producing a rising tone in the process (cf. the neoacute retraction). This reintroduces phonemic tone on initial syllables.

Only some conservative Serbo-Croatian dialects (e.g. Chakavian) maintain the original accentual system unchanged. Some Slovene dialects (see below) maintain all original properties of the accentual system, but with various changes in multisyllabic words.

Slovene shows large dialectal diversity for its relatively small area of distribution. For example, only the central dialects and one of the two literary standards maintain tone, and some of the northwest dialects maintain original nasality. In the dialects maintaining tone, the prosody of monosyllables agrees closely with the most conservative Serbo-Croatian dialects (e.g. Chakavian). In multisyllabic words, all non-final stressed vowels were lengthened (acute and neoacute becoming long rising, while circumflex and original short become long falling), and all non-final unstressed vowels were shortened, which produced a prosodic pattern not unlike that found in modern Italian. Length remained distinctive in final syllables only. But prior to this, various shifts happened:

- Original acute became circumflex (long falling) in certain cases, e.g. prior to a lengthened syllable (the neo-circumflex).
- With non-final original circumflex and short syllables, the accent shifts to the right, becoming circumflex (long falling) (the progressive shift).
- With non-initial original acute, or with any original final-accented syllable in a multisyllabic word, the accent shifts left onto original long syllables, becoming acute (long rising).
- In some dialects, a further leftward shift happens from original final-accented syllables to original short syllables. In the standard language, this happens specifically with *e *o, which become acute (long rising) with a low-mid quality (whereas other long mid vowels are normally reflected as high-mid). In some non-standard dialects, this also happens with *ǝ < strong yers (although it remains short).

In West Slavic, esp. in Czech, a number of originally short vowels in monosyllables are lengthened. The conditions for this lengthening are incompletely understood and seem to involve good deal of analogy and dialect mixing.

Note that the overall effect of all these changes is that either the MCS acute, MCS circumflex or both have ended up shortened in various languages in various circumstances, while the LCS neoacute has generally remained long.

Example:

Accent	Common Slavic	Chakavian	Slovene	Czech	Slovak	Bulgarian	Russian
Circumflex	*gôrdъ "town"	grȃd	grȃd "castle"	hrad "castle"	hrad "castle"	grad-ǎ́t "the town"	górod
Acute	*pórgъ "doorsill"	prȁg	pràg (gen. prága)	práh (gen. prahu)	prah	prág-ǎt "the doorsill"	poróg
Neoacute	*kõrľь "king"	králj	králj	král (gen. krále)	kráľ	králj-at "the king"	koról'

== Loanwords ==
The lexical stock of the Slavic languages also includes a number of loanwords from the languages of various tribes and peoples that the Proto-Slavic speakers came into contact with. These include mostly Indo-European speakers, chiefly Germanic (Gothic and Old High German), speakers of Vulgar Latin or some early Romance dialects, Middle Greek and, to a much lesser extent, Eastern Iranian (mostly pertaining to religious sphere) and Celtic.

Many terms of Greco-Roman cultural provenience have been diffused into Slavic by Gothic mediation, and analysis has shown that Germanic borrowings into Slavic show at least 4 distinct chronological strata, and must have entered Proto-Slavic in a long period.

Of non-Indo-European languages, possible connections have been made to various Turkic and Avar, but their reconstruction is very unreliable due to the scarcity of the evidence and the relatively late attestation of both Slavic and Turkic languages. When the Turkic tribal union of Volga Bulgars and Khazars conquered territories in the Ukrainian steppe belt between the 6th and 8th centuries AD, it is possible that such Turkisms as kahan 'kagan, ruler', bahatyr 'hero', and ban 'high rank' and the suffix -čij found their way into the Common Slavic language.

== See also ==
- Proto-Slavic
- History of Proto-Slavic
- Proto-Balto-Slavic
- Old Church Slavonic
- Slavic languages
- Balto-Slavic languages
- Proto-Slavic accent
- Slavic liquid metathesis and pleophony
- Outline of Slavic history and culture

Individual language histories

- Bosnian
- Czech
- Croatian
- Russian
- Belarusian
- Polish
- Bulgarian
- Macedonian
- Serbo-Croatian
- Slovak
- Ukrainian
- Slovene
- Dialects of Serbo-Croatian
