= History of Proto-Slavic =

The Proto-Slavic language, the hypothetical ancestor of the modern-day Slavic languages, developed from the ancestral Proto-Balto-Slavic language (c. 1500 BC), which is the parent language of the Balto-Slavic languages (both the Slavic and Baltic languages, e.g. Latvian and Lithuanian). The first 2,000 years or so consist of the pre-Slavic era, a long period during which none of the later dialectal differences between Slavic languages had yet emerged. The last stage in which the language remained without internal differences that later characterize different Slavic languages can be dated around AD 500 and is sometimes termed Proto-Slavic proper or Early Common Slavic. Following this is the Common Slavic period (c. 500–1000), during which the first dialectal differences appeared but the entire Slavic-speaking area continued to function as a single language, with sound changes tending to spread throughout the entire area. By around 1000, the area had broken up into separate East Slavic, West Slavic and South Slavic languages, and in the following centuries it broke up further into the various modern Slavic languages of which the following are extant: Belarusian, Russian, Rusyn and Ukrainian in the East; Czech, Slovak, Polish, Kashubian and the Sorbian languages in the West, and Bulgarian, Macedonian, Serbo-Croatian and Slovenian in the South.

The period from the early centuries AD to the end of the Common Slavic period around 1000 was a time of rapid change, concurrent with the explosive growth of the Slavic-speaking area. By the end of this period, most of the features of the modern Slavic languages had been established. The first historical documentation of the Slavic languages is found in isolated names and words in Greek documents starting in the 6th century, when Slavic-speaking tribes first came in contact with the Greek-speaking Byzantine Empire. The first continuous texts date from the late 9th century and were written in Old Church Slavonic—based on the Slavic dialect used in the region of Thessaloniki in Greek Macedonia—as part of the Christianization of the Slavs by Saints Cyril and Methodius and their followers. Because these texts were written during the Common Slavic period, the language they document is close to the ancestral Proto-Slavic language and is still presenting enough unity, therefore it is critically important to the linguistic reconstruction of Slavic-language history.

== Introduction ==
Proto-Slavic is descended from Proto-Balto-Slavic (the ancestor of the Balto-Slavic languages). This language in turn is descended from Proto-Indo-European, the parent language of the vast majority of European languages (including English, German, Spanish, French, etc.). Proto-Slavic gradually evolved into the various Slavic languages during the latter half of the first millennium AD, concurrent with the explosive growth of the Slavic-speaking area. There is no scholarly consensus concerning either the number of stages involved in the development of the language (its periodization) or the terms used to describe them. For consistency and convenience, this article and the Proto-Slavic article adopt the following scheme:

1. Pre-Slavic (c. 1500 BC – AD 300): A long period of gradual development. The most significant phonological developments during this period involved the prosodic system, e.g. tonal and other register distinctions on syllables.
2. Proto-Slavic proper or Early Common Slavic (c. AD 300–600): The early, uniform stage of Common Slavic, a period of rapid phonological change. There are no dialectal distinctions reconstructible from this period.
3. Middle Common Slavic (c. 600–800): The stage with the earliest identifiable dialectal distinctions. Rapid phonological change continued, although with the massive expansion of the Slavic-speaking area. Although some dialectal variation did exist, most sound changes were still uniform and consistent in their application. By the end of this stage, the vowel and consonant phonemes of the language were largely the same as those still found in the modern languages. For this reason, reconstructed "Proto-Slavic" forms commonly found in scholarly works and etymological dictionaries normally correspond to this period.
4. Late Common Slavic (c. 800–1000, although perhaps through c. 1150 in Kievan Rus', in the far northeast): The last stage in which the whole Slavic-speaking area still functioned as a single language, with sound changes normally propagating throughout the entire area, although often with significant dialectal variation in the details.

Slavic scholars differ widely in both the terminology and periodization of these developments. Some scholars do not use the term "Common Slavic" at all. For some others, the Common Slavic period comes after Proto-Slavic rather than including it. Some scholars (e.g. Frederik Kortlandt) divide the Common Slavic period into five or more stages, while others use as few as two (an early, uniform stage and a late, dialectally differentiated stage).

The emergence of Proto-Slavic was closely tied to the broader cultural and social developments of early Slavic communities. Archaeological and linguistic research indicates that these groups formed a network of agrarian societies across Eastern and Central Europe, whose interactions and migrations contributed to the spread of common linguistic and cultural features. Over several centuries, Proto-Slavic gradually diverged from the Balto-Slavic continuum through ongoing contact and mutual intelligibility, developing distinct sound systems and grammatical patterns that defined it as an independent linguistic branch. Between the 6th and 9th centuries AD, the growing geographic dispersion of Slavic-speaking peoples led to increasing dialectal differentiation, giving rise to the East, West, and South Slavic branches that would later develop into the modern Slavic languages.

== Origin ==
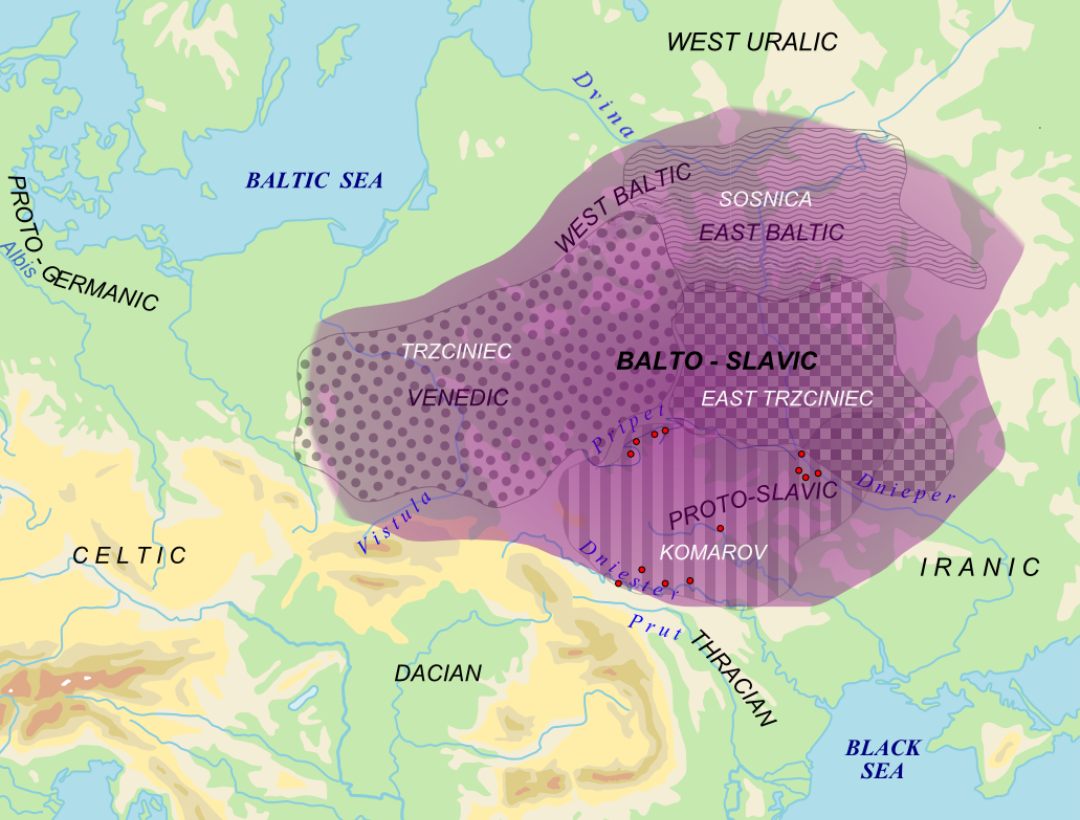
Area of Balto-Slavic dialect continuum (purple) with proposed material cultures correlating to speakers of Balto-Slavic in the Bronze Age (white). Red dots = archaic Slavic hydronyms

=== Proto-Balto-Slavic ===
The currently most favoured model, the Kurgan hypothesis, places the Urheimat of the Proto-Indo-European people in the Pontic steppe, represented archaeologically by the 5th millennium BCE Sredny Stog culture. From here, various daughter dialects dispersed radially in several waves between c. 4400 and 3000 BC. The phonological changes which set Balto-Slavic apart from other Indo-European languages probably lasted from c. 3000 to 1000 BC, a period known as common Proto-Balto-Slavic. Kortlandt (1990) links the earliest stages of Balto-Slavic development with the Middle Dnieper culture which connects the Corded Ware and Yamna cultures. Kurganists connect the latter two cultures with the so-called "Northwest (IE) group" and the Iranian-speaking steppe nomads, respectively. This fits with the linguistic evidence in that Balto-Slavic appears to have had close contacts with Indo-Iranian and Proto-Germanic.

Scholars have proposed an association between Balto-Slavic and Germanic on the basis of lexical and morphological similarities that are unique to these languages. Apart from a proposed genetic relationship (PIE forming a Germano-Balto-Slavic sub-branch), the similarities are likely due to continuous contacts, whereby common loan words spread through the communities in the forest zones at an early time of their linguistic development.

Similarly, Balto-Slavic and Indo-Iranian might have formed some kind of continuum from the north-west to the south-east, given that they share both satemization and the Ruki sound law. Genetic studies have found higher frequencies of haplogroup R1a among Slavic peoples than among Germans. This haplogroup increases in frequency to the east of the Indo-European languages' distribution, while haplogroup R1b increases to the west. Balto-Slavic then expanded along the forest zone, replacing earlier centum dialects, such as Pre-Proto-Germanic. This might explain the presence of a few prehistoric centum adstratal lexemes.

=== Pre-Slavic ===
A pre-Slavic period began c. 1500 to 1000 BC, whereby certain phonological changes and linguistic contacts did not disperse evenly through all Balto-Slavic dialects. The development into Proto-Slavic probably occurred along the southern periphery of the Proto-Balto-Slavic continuum. The most archaic Slavic hydronyms are found here, along the middle Dnieper, Pripet and upper Dniester rivers. This agrees well with the fact that inherited Common Slavic vocabulary does not include detailed terminology for physical surface features peculiar of the mountains or the steppe, nor any relating to the sea, to coastal features, littoral flora or fauna, or salt water fishes. On the other hand, it does include well-developed terminology for inland bodies of water (lakes, river, swamps) and kinds of forest (deciduous and coniferous), for the trees, plants, animals and birds indigenous to the temperate forest zone, and for the fish native to its waters. Indeed, Trubachev argues that this location fostered contacts between speakers of Pre-Proto-Slavic with the cultural innovations which emanated from central Europe and the steppe. Although language groups cannot be straightforwardly equated with archaeological cultures, the emergence of a Pre-Proto-Slavic linguistic community corresponds temporally and geographically with the Komarov and Chernoles cultures (Novotná, Blažek). Both linguists and archaeologists therefore often locate the Slavic Urheimat specifically within this area.

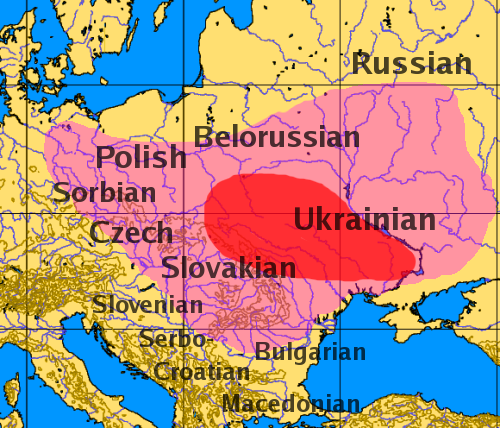
Historical distribution of the Slavic languages. The larger shaded area is the Prague-Penkov-Kolochin complex of cultures of the sixth to seventh centuries, likely corresponding to the spread of Slavic-speaking tribes of the time. The smaller shaded area indicates the core area of Slavic river names (after Mallory & Adams (1997:524ff).

In proto-historical times, the Slavic homeland experienced intrusions of foreign elements. Beginning from c. 500 BC to AD 200, the Scythians and then the Sarmatians expanded their control into the forest steppe. A few Eastern Iranian loan words, especially relating to religious and cultural practices, have been seen as evidence of cultural influences. Subsequently, loan words of Germanic origin also appear. This is connected to the movement of east Germanic groups into the Vistula basin, and subsequently to the middle Dnieper basin, associated with the appearance of the Przeworsk and Chernyakhov cultures, respectively.

Despite these developments, Slavic remained conservative and was still typologically very similar to other Balto-Slavic dialects. Even into the Common Era, the various Balto-Slavic dialects formed a dialect continuum stretching from the Vistula to the Don and Oka basins, and from the Baltic and upper Volga to southern Russia and northern Ukraine. Exactly when Slavs began to identify as a distinct ethno-cultural unit remains a subject of debate. For example, Kobylinski (2005) links the phenomenon to the Zarubinets culture 200 BC to AD 200, Vlodymyr Baran places Slavic ethnogenesis within the Chernyakov era, while Curta places it in the Danube basin in the sixth century CE. It is likely that linguistic affinity played an important role in defining group identity for the Slavs. The term Slav is proposed to be an autonym referring to "people who (use the words to) speak."

Another important aspect of this period is that the Iranian dialects of the Scythians and Sarmatians had a considerable impact on the Slavic vocabulary, during the extensive contacts between the aforementioned languages and (early) Proto-Slavic for about a millennium, and the eventual absorption and assimilation (e.g. Slavicisation) of the Iranian-speaking Scythians, Sarmatians, and Alans in Eastern Europe by the Proto-Slavic population of the region.

=== Proto-Slavic (c. 400–600) ===
Beginning around AD 500, the Slavic speakers rapidly expanded in all directions from a homeland in eastern Poland and western Ukraine. As it expanded throughout eastern Europe, it obliterated whatever remained of easternmost Celtic, Avar, Venetic, possibly Dacian, as well as many other Balto-Slavic dialects, and the Slav ethnonym spread out considerably. By the 8th century, Proto-Slavic is believed to have been spoken uniformly in the Slavic part of eastern Europe. What caused the rapid expansion of Slavic remains a topic of discussion. Traditional theories link its spread to a demographic expansion of Slavs migrating radially from their Urheimat, whereas more processual theories attempt to modify the picture by introducing concepts such as "elite dominance", language shifts and possibly becoming a lingua franca in the Avar Khaganate. However, even proponents of this processual models concede that it fails to explain how Slavic spread to the Baltic and western Russia, areas which had no historical connection with the Avar Khaganate. The idea of Slavic as a lingua franca is rejected by linguists as the Late Proto-Slavic/Common Slavic had a complex morphological and accentological system, and as concluded by Alan Timberlake, "there was demic movement, the recent vilification of migration notwithstanding ... the spread of Slavic is not especially complex", it was mostly due to natives depopulation, secondly interaction with and adoption by other ethnic groups, and thirdly Slavic assimilation of small groups of foreign speaking people. Recent archaeogenetic studies confirm that the Slavic language was spread by large movements of Early Slavs from Eastern Europe.

=== Common Slavic (c. 600–1000) ===
Due to incompletely understood sociocultural factors, a number of sound changes occurred that uniformly affected all later dialects even well after the Slavic-speaking area had become dialectally differentiated, for at least four or five centuries after the initial Slavic dispersion. This makes it difficult to identify a single point at which Proto-Slavic broke up into regional dialects. As a result, it is customary to speak of a "Common Slavic" period during which sound changes spread across the entire Slavic-speaking area, but not necessarily with uniform results. The Early Common Slavic period, from roughly 400 to 600, can be identified as Proto-Slavic proper. The onomastic evidence and glosses of Slavic words in foreign-language texts show no detectable regional differences during this period.

During the Middle Common Slavic period, from perhaps 600 to 800, some dialectal differences existed, especially in peripheral dialects, but most sound changes still occurred uniformly. (For example, the Old Novgorod dialect did not exhibit the second palatalization of velars while all the other Slavic dialects did.) Reconstructed "Proto-Slavic" forms are normally from this period. It is thought that the distinction of long and short vowels by quality, normally reflected in "Proto-Slavic" reconstructed forms, occurred during this time: Greek transcriptions from the 5th and 6th centuries still indicate Common Slavic *o as a.

During the Late Common Slavic period, from c. 800 to 1000, conceptual sound changes (e.g. the conversion of TORT sequences into open syllables and the development of the neoacute accent) still occurred across the entire Slavic area, but often in dialectally differentiated ways. In addition, migrations of Uralic speaking peoples into modern Hungary and Romania created geographic separations between Slavic dialects. Written documents of the ninth, tenth and eleventh centuries demonstrate some local features. For example, the Freising monuments show a dialect which contains some phonetic and lexical elements peculiar to Slovenian dialects (e.g. rhotacism, the word krilatec). Significant continuous Slavic-language texts exist from this period, beginning with the extant Old Church Slavonic (OCS) texts, composed in the 9th century but copied in the 10th century. The end of the Common Slavic period is usually reckoned with the loss of weak yers, which occurred in Bulgaria c. 950 but did not reach Russia until c. 1150. This is clearly revealed in the texts themselves: During the century or so between the composition and copying of the OCS texts, the weak yers disappeared as vowels, and as a result, the texts show marked instability in their representation. (The main exception is the Codex Zographensis, copied just before yer loss.) On the other hand, the Old East Slavic texts represent the weak yers with almost complete etymological fidelity until nearly two centuries later.

=== Periodization ===
The terminology of these periods is not consistent. For example, Schenker speaks only of "Early Proto-Slavonic" (= Early Common Slavic, the period of entirely uniform developments) and "Late Proto-Slavonic" (= Middle and Late Common Slavic), with the latter period beginning with the second regressive palatalization, due to the differing outcomes of pre-Proto-Slavic *x. (Note that some authors, e.g. Kortlandt, place the beginning of dialectal developments later by postulating an outcome *ś of the second regressive palatalization, which only later developed into *s or *š.) Kortlandt's chronology, on the other hand, includes six stages after the Balto-Slavic period:

1. "Early Slavic" (≈ pre-Proto-Slavic)
2. "Early Middle Slavic" (≈ Early Common Slavic)
3. "Late Middle Slavic" (≈ Middle Common Slavic)
4. "Young Proto-Slavic" (≈ first part of Late Common Slavic)
5. "Late Proto-Slavic" (≈ second part of Late Common Slavic)
6. "Disintegrating Slavic" (widespread post-Common-Slavic developments, e.g. loss of nasalization)

The first regressive palatalization of velars (see below) may well have operated during Early Common Slavic and is thought by Arnošt Lemprecht to have specifically operated during the 5th century. The progressive palatalization of velars, if it is older, can predate this only by 200 to 300 years at most, since it post-dates Proto-Germanic borrowings into Slavic, which are generally agreed to have occurred no earlier than the 2nd century. The monophthongization of /au/, /ai/ is thought to have occurred near the end of Early Common Slavic or beginning of Middle Common Slavic (c. 600), and the second regressive palatalization of velars not long afterwards. This implies that, until around the time of the earliest Slavic expansion, Slavic was a conservative language not so different from the various attested Baltic languages.

=== First written Slavic languages ===
In the second half of the ninth century, the Slavic dialect spoken north of Thessaloniki, in the hinterlands of Macedonia, became the basis for the first written Slavic language, created by the brothers Cyril and Methodius who translated portions of the Bible and other church books. The language they recorded is known as Old Church Slavonic. Old Church Slavonic is not identical to Proto-Slavic, having been recorded at least two centuries after the breakup of Proto-Slavic, and it shows features that clearly distinguish it from Proto-Slavic. However, it is still reasonably close, and the mutual intelligibility between Old Church Slavonic and other Slavic dialects of those days was proved by Cyril and Methodius' mission to Great Moravia and Pannonia. There, their early South Slavic dialect used for the translations was clearly understandable to the local population which spoke an early West Slavic dialect.

== Notation ==
See Proto-Balto-Slavic language#Notation for much more detail on the uses of the most commonly encountered diacritics for indicating prosody (á, à, â, ã, ȁ, a̋, ā, ă) and various other phonetic distinctions (ą, ẹ, ė, š, ś, etc.) in different Balto-Slavic languages.

=== Vowel notation ===
Two different and conflicting systems for denoting vowels are commonly in use in Indo-European and Balto-Slavic linguistics on the one hand, and Slavic linguistics on the other. In the first, vowel length is consistently distinguished with a macron above the letter, while in the latter it is not clearly indicated. The following table explains these differences:

Vowel	IE/B-S	Slavic
Short front closed vowel (front yer)	i	ĭ or ь
Short back closed vowel (back yer)	u	ŭ or ъ
Short front open vowel	e	e
Short back open vowel	a	o
Long front closed vowel	ī	i
Long back closed vowel	ū	y [ɨː]
Long front open vowel (yat)	ē	ě
Long back open vowel	ā	a

For consistency, all discussions of sounds up to (but not including) Middle Common Slavic use the common Balto-Slavic notation of vowels, while discussions of Middle and Late Common Slavic (the phonology and grammar sections) and later dialects use the Slavic notation.

=== Other vowel and consonant diacritics ===
Other marks used within Balto-Slavic and Slavic linguistics are:

- The háček on consonants (č š ž), indicating a "hushing" quality [tʃ ʃ ʒ], as in English kitchen, mission, vision.
- Various strongly palatal(ized) consonants (a more "hissing" quality in case of sibilants) usually indicated by an acute accent (ć ǵ ḱ ĺ ń ŕ ś ź) or a háček (ď ľ ň ř ť).
- The ogonek (ą ę ǫ), indicating vowel nasalization (in modern standard Lithuanian this is historical only).

=== Prosodic notation ===
For Middle and Late Common Slavic, the following marks are used to indicate prosodic distinctions, based on the standard notation in Serbo-Croatian:

- Long rising (á): This indicates the Balto-Slavic acute accent in Middle Common Slavic only.
- Short rising (à): This indicates the Balto-Slavic acute accent in Late Common Slavic, where it was shortened.
- Long falling (ȃ): This normally indicates the Balto-Slavic circumflex accent. In Late Common Slavic, it also indicates originally short (falling) accent that was lengthened in monosyllables. This secondary circumflex occurs only on the short vowels e, o, ь, ъ in an open syllable (i.e. when not forming part of a liquid diphthong).
- Short falling (ȁ): This indicates the Balto-Slavic short accent. In Late Common Slavic, this accent was lengthened in monosyllables (see preceding entry).
- Neoacute (ã): This indicates the Late Common Slavic neoacute accent, which was pronounced as a rising accent, usually long but short when occurring on some syllable types in certain languages. This results from retraction of the accent, i.e. the Middle Common Slavic accent fell on the following syllable (usually specifically a weak yer).

=== Other prosodic diacritics ===
There are multiple competing systems used to indicate prosody in different Balto-Slavic languages (see Proto-Balto-Slavic language#Notation for more details). The most important for this article are:

1. Three-way system of Proto-Slavic, Proto-Balto-Slavic, modern Lithuanian: Acute tone (á) vs. circumflex tone (ȃ or ã) vs. short accent (à).
2. Four-way Serbo-Croatian system, also used in Slovenian and often in Slavic reconstructions: long rising (á), short rising (à), long falling (ȃ), short falling (ȁ). In the Chakavian dialect and other archaic dialects, the long rising accent is notated with a tilde (ã), indicating its normal origin in the Late Common Slavic neoacute accent (see above).
3. Length only, as in Czech and Slovak: long (á) vs. short (a).
4. Stress only, as in Russian, Ukrainian and Bulgarian: stressed (á) vs. unstressed (a).

== Historical development up to Proto-Slavic ==
=== Split from Indo-European ===
Proto-Balto-Slavic has the satem sound changes wherein Proto-Indo-European (PIE) palatovelar consonants became affricate or fricative consonants pronounced closer to the front of the mouth, conventionally indicated as *ś and *ź. These became simple dental fricatives *s and *z in Proto-Slavic:

- *ḱ → *ś → *s
- *ǵ → *ź → *z
- *ǵʰ → *ź → *z

This sound change was incomplete, in that all Baltic and Slavic languages have instances where PIE palatovelars appear as *k and *g, often in doublets (i.e. etymologically related words, where one has a sound descended from *k or *g and the other has a sound descended from *ś or *ź) such as *světъ and *květъ, both descended from PIE *ḱweyt-.

Other satem sound changes are delabialization of labiovelar consonants before rounded vowels and the ruki sound law, which shifted *s to *š after *r, *u, *k or *i. In Proto-Slavic, this sound was shifted backwards to become *x, although it was often shifted forward again by one of the three sound laws causing palatalization of velars.

In the Balto-Slavic period, final *t and *d were lost.

Also present in Balto-Slavic were the diphthongs *ei and *ai as well as liquid diphthongs *ul, *il, *ur, *ir, the latter set deriving from syllabic liquids; the vocalic element merged with *u after labiovelar stops and with *i everywhere else, and the remaining labiovelars subsequently lost their labialization.

Around this time, the PIE aspirated consonants merged with voiced ones:

- *bʰ → *b
- *dʰ → *d
- *gʰ → *g

Once it split off, the Proto-Slavic period probably encompassed a period of stability lasting 2,000 years with only several centuries of rapid change before and during the breakup of Slavic linguistic unity that came about due to Slavic migrations in the early sixth century. As such, the chronology of changes including the three palatalizations and ending with the change of *ě to *a in certain contexts defines the Common Slavic period.

Long *ē and *ō raised to *ī and *ū before a final sonorant, and sonorants following a long vowel were deleted. Proto-Slavic shared the common Balto-Slavic merging of *o with *a. However, while long *ō and *ā remained distinct in Baltic, they merged in Slavic (after the previous change), so that early Slavic did not possess the sounds *o or *ō.

=== Elimination of syllable codas ===
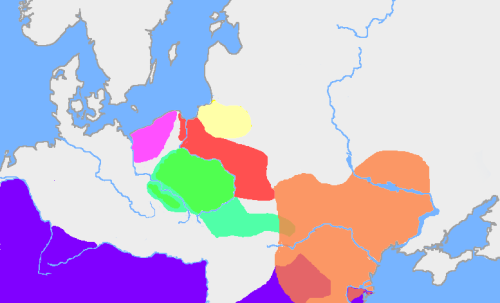
Eastern Europe in the 3rd century CE: Chernyakhov culture Przeworsk culture Wielbark Culture (associated with the Goths) a Baltic culture (Aesti/Yotvingian?) Dębczyn culture Roman Empire

A tendency for rising sonority in a syllable (arrangement of phonemes in a syllable from lower to higher sonority) marks the beginning of the Common Slavic period. One aspect of this, generally referred to as the "Law of Open Syllables", led to a gradual elimination of closed syllables. When possible, consonants in the coda were resyllabified into the onset of the following syllable. For example, *kun-je-mou "to him" became *ku-nje-mou (OCS kъňemu), and *vuz-dā-tēi "to give back" became *vu-zdā-tēi (OCS vъzdati). This did not always entail actual phonetic change, but simply a reinterpretation of syllable boundaries, and was possible only when the entire cluster could begin a syllable or word (as in *nj, *zd, *stv, but not *nt, *rd, *pn).

When the cluster was not permissible as a syllable onset, any impermissible consonants were deleted from the coda. Thus, e.g. PIE *supnós > Slavic *sъnъ, eliminating the impermissible onset pn-. With regard to clusters of stop + sonorant, not all Slavic languages show the same outcome. The cluster *dl is preserved in West Slavic, but simplified to *l in East and South Slavic, e.g. *ordlo > Czech rádlo, Polish radło, but not Serbo-Croatian ralo. The verb *dvignǫti appears with the cluster gn intact in South and West Slavic, while it is simplified to n in East Slavic. The verb *kydnǫti, on the other hand, preserves the cluster dn only in Czech and Slovak, simplifying it to n elsewhere.

As part of this development, diphthongs were monophthongized, and nasal consonants in the syllable coda were reduced to nasalization of the preceding vowel (*ę and *ǫ). Liquid diphthongs were eliminated in most Slavic languages, but with different outcomes in different languages.

After these changes, a CV syllable structure (that is, one of segments ordered from lower to higher sonority) arose and the syllable became a basic structural unit of the language.

=== Syllable synharmony ===
Another tendency arose in the Common Slavic period wherein successive segmental phonemes in a syllable assimilated articulatory features (primarily place of articulation). This is called syllable synharmony or intrasyllabic harmony. Thus syllables (rather than just the consonant or the vowel) were distinguished as either "soft" (palatal) or "hard" (non-palatal). This led to consonants developing palatalized allophones in syllables containing front vowels, resulting in the first regressive palatalization. It also led to the fronting of back vowels after /j/.

=== Nasalization ===
Syllable-final nasals *m and *n (i.e. when not directly followed by a vowel) coalesced with a previous vowel, causing it to become nasalized (indicated with an ogonek diacritic below the vowel):

Balto-Slavic	Early Proto-Slavic	Proto-Slavic	Common Slavic
*am, *an, *ām, *ān, *ōm, *ōn	*ą̄		*ǫ
*em, *en, *ēm, *ēn	*ę̄		*ę
*im, *in, *īm, *īn	*į̄	*ę̄	*ę
*um, *un, *ūm, *ūn	*ų̄		*y
*Jum, *Jun, *Jūm, *Jūn	*Jų̄	*Jį̄	*Ję̇

The nasal element of *im, *in, *um, *un is lost word-finally in inflectional endings, and therefore does not cause nasalization.

Examples showing these developments:

Late PIE	Balto-Slavic	Meaning	Lithuanian	Proto-Slavic	Late Common Slavic
*ǵómbʰos	*źambas	"tooth"	žam̃bas "sharp edge"	*zą̄̂bu	*zǫ̂bъ
*ǵenh₃tis	*źénˀtis, *źénˀtas	"son in law"	žéntas	*zę̄́ti	*zę̀tь
*deḱmtos	*deśimtas	"tenth"	dešim̃tas	*desę̄tu	*desętъ
*lnHkom	*lúnˀka	"bast"	lùnkas	*lų̄́ka	*lỳko
?	*kanjun(s)	"horses" (acc.)	—	*kanjį̄	*koňę̇

The nasalization of *ų̄ was eventually lost. However, when *ų̄ followed a palatal consonant such as /j/ (indicated generically as *J), it was fronted to *į̄, which preserved its nasalization much longer. This new *į̄ did not originally merge with the result of nasalizing original *im/*in, as shown in the table. Instead, it evolved in Common Slavic times to a high-mid nasal vowel *ę̇, higher than the low-mid vowel *ę. In South Slavic, these two vowels merged as *ę. Elsewhere, however, *ę̇ was denasalized, merging with *ě, while *ę was generally lowered to *æ̨ (often reflected as ja). Common Slavic *desętyję̇ koňę̇ "the tenth horses (accusative plural)" appears as desętyję koňę in Old Church Slavonic and desete konje in Serbo-Croatian (South Slavic), but as desáté koně in modern Czech and dziesiąte konie in Polish (West Slavic), and as десятые кони (desjatyje koni, nominative plural) in Russian (East Slavic). Note that Polish normally preserves nasal vowels, but it does not have a nasal vowel in the accusative plural ending, while it retains it in the stem of "tenth".

Nasalization also occurred before a nasal consonant, whenever a vowel was followed by two nasals. However, in this case, several later dialects denasalized the vowel at an early date. Both pomęnǫti' and poměnǫti "remember" (from earlier *pa-men-nantī?) are found in Old Church Slavonic. The common word *jĭmę "name" can be traced back to earlier *inmen with denasalization, from a PIE zero grade alternant *h₁n̥h₃mén-.

=== First regressive palatalization ===
As an extension of the system of syllable synharmony, velar consonants were palatalized to postalveolar consonants before front vowels (*i, *ī, *e, *ē) and before *j:

- *k → *č [tʃ]
- *g → *dž [dʒ] → *ž [ʒ]
- *x → *š [ʃ]
- *sk → *šč [ʃtʃ]
- *zg → *ždž [ʒdʒ]

This was the first regressive palatalization. Although *g palatalized to an affricate, this soon lenited to a fricative (but *ždž was retained). Some Germanic loanwords were borrowed early enough to be affected by the first palatalization. One example is *šelmŭ, from earlier *xelmŭ, from Germanic *helmaz.

=== Iotation ===
In a process called iotation or yodization, *j merged with a previous consonant (unless it was labial), and those consonants acquired a palatal articulation. Compare English yod-coalescence. This change probably did not occur together with the first regressive palatalization, but somewhat later, and it remained productive well into the Late Common Slavic period.

- *tj → *ť
- *dj → *ď
- *stj → *šť (→ presumably šč)
- *zdj → *žď (→ presumably ždž)
- *sj → *š
- *zj → *ž
- *lj → ľ /lʲ/
- *nj → ň /nʲ/
- *rj → ř /rʲ/

The combinations *gt and *kt merged into *ť in Proto-Slavic times and show outcomes identical to *ť in all languages. This combination occurred in a few lexical items (*dъťi "daughter" < *dъkti, *noťь "night" < *noktь), but also occurred in infinitives of verbs with stems ending in -g and -k, which would have originally ended in *-gti and *-kti. This accounts for the irregular infinitive ending some verbs such as Polish móc, Russian мочь from Proto-Slavic *moťi < *mog-ti, where normally these languages have infinitives in -ć and -ть respectively.

In the case of the palatal consonants that had resulted from the first regressive palatalization, the *j simply disappeared without altering the preceding consonant:

- *čj → *č [tʃ]
- *(d)žj → *(d)ž [ʒ]
- *šj → *š [ʃ]
- *ščj → *šč [ʃtʃ]
- *ždžj → *ždž [ʒdʒ]

In both East and South Slavic, labial consonants (*m, *b, *p, *v) were also affected by iotation, acquiring a lateral off-glide ľ /lʲ/:

- *mj → mľ
- *bj → bľ
- *pj → pľ
- *vj → vľ

Many researchers believe that this change actually occurred throughout Proto-Slavic and was later 'reversed' in West Slavic and in most dialects of the Eastern subgroup of South Slavic languages (Macedonian and Bulgarian, and the transitional Torlakian dialect) by analogy with related word forms lacking the lateral. The Codex Suprasliensis, for example, has земьꙗ < *zemja (i.e. an intrusive *ь where East and South Slavic languages have *ľ); compare:

- *zemja (→ *zemľa) → *zemьja →
  - Bulgarian: земя [zɛˈmʲa]
  - Macedonian: земја [ˈzɛmja]
  - Torlakian: zemja [ˈzɛmja]
  - Polish: ziemia [ˈʑɛmʲa]

Some Northern Macedonian dialects, however, acquired an *n (e.g. [ˈzɛmɲa] < *zemja).

A few words with etymological initial *bj- and *pj- are reflected as *bľ- and *pľ- even in West Slavic:

- *pľьvàti "to spit" < PIE *(s)pieHu-, cf. Lithuanian spjáuti.
- *bľustì "to watch, to perk up" (1sg. *bľudǫ̀) < PIE *bʰeudʰ-.

=== Vowel fronting ===
Syllabic synharmony also worked in reverse, and caused the palatal articulation of a consonant to influence a following vowel, turning it from a back vowel into a front vowel. There were two sources for this process. The first was a preceding *j or a consonant that had undergone iotation. The second was the progressive palatalization (see below), which produced new palatal consonants before back vowels. The result of this fronting was as follows (with J acting as a cover symbol for any consonant with a palatal articulation):

- *Ja → *Je
- *Jā → *Jē
- *Ju → *Ji
- *Jū → *Jī
- *Jai → *Jei (→ *Jī)
- *Jau → *Jeu (→ *Jū)
- *Jų̄ → *Jį̄ (→ *Ję̇)

Towards the end of the Late Common Slavic period, an opposing change happened, in which long *Jē was backed to *Jā. This change is normally identified with the end of the tendency for syllabic synharmony.

Vowel fronting clearly preceded monophthongization, in that the outputs *Jei, *Jeu were later affected by monophthongization just as original *ei, *eu were. However, there is no guarantee that vowel fronting followed the progressive palatalization despite the fact that the output of the latter process was affected by vowel fronting. The reason is that the rule triggering vowel fronting may well have operated as a surface filter, i.e. a rule that remained part of the grammar for an extended period of time, operating automatically on any new palatal consonants as they were produced.

Vowel fronting did not operate on the low nasal vowel *ą (later *ǫ), cf. Old Church Slavonic znajǫ "I know". However, it did operate on the high nasal vowel *ų, leading to alternations, e.g. Old Church Slavonic accusative plural raby 'slaves' (< *-ų̄) vs. koňę 'horses' (< *-jį̄ < *-jų̄). See the section on nasalization for more discussion.

=== Prothesis ===
During the Common Slavic period, prothetic glides were inserted before words that began with vowels, consistent with the tendency for rising sonority within a syllable. These cases merged with existing word-initial sequences of glide + vowel, and show the same outcome in the later languages. *v was inserted before rounded vowels (*u, *ū), *j before unrounded vowels (*e, ē, *i, *ī). Not all vowels show equal treatment in this respect, however. High vowels generally have prothesis without exception in all Slavic languages, as do *e, *ě and nasal *ę:

- *i- > *ji- (> *jь-)
- *ī- > *jī- (> *ji-)
- *u- > *wu- (> *vъ-)
- *ū- > *wū- (> *vy-)
- *e- > *je-
- *ę- > *ję-
- *ē- > *jē- (> *jě- or *ja-)

In later Slavic, *jь- and *ji- appear to have merged, and both are reflected as simple i- in many modern Slavic languages. In Common Slavic itself, however, they were still distinguished by length for the purpose of intonation. The sequence *ji- could belong to accent paradigm a, while the sequence *jь- could not.

Prothesis generally did not apply to short *a (which developed into *o or nasal *ǫ), although some East Slavic dialects seem to have developed it regardless. There seems to have been some uncertainty concerning the interpretation of long *ā as a rounded or unrounded vowel. Prothesis seems to have applied intermittently to it. When it does apply, *ā- > *jā- is frequent, but *ā- > *vā- is also found.

The old diphthongs *ei- and *ai- develop the same as *ī- and *ē- respectively, although *ai- never develops into *ja-. The diphthong *au-, later *u-, mostly resists prothesis, but some cases (e.g. *utro) also show *ju-.

=== Monophthongization and other vowel changes ===
*ū lost its labialization (possibly [ɯː] or [ɨː], represented hereafter as ⟨y⟩, as in modern Polish), but not before prothesis occurred, as prothesis of *v before unrounded *y seems unlikely. This was closely followed by the monophthongization of diphthongs in all environments, in accordance with the law of open syllables. Following this change, short *a acquired non-distinctive rounding (probably [ɒ] in first instance), and is denoted as *o from this point onwards.

- *ū → *ȳ → y
- *au, *eu → *ū
- *ei → *ī
- *ai → *ē or ī^{†}
- *a → *o

^†In many common grammatical forms such as the nominative plural of o-stems (Schenker 2002:89), the second person imperative (Schenker 2002:103), in the second singular of athematic verbs and in the dative singular of the clitic personal pronouns, *ai became *ī (Schenker 2002:90).

=== Second regressive palatalization ===
Proto-Slavic had acquired front vowels, ē (possibly an open front vowel [æː]) and sometimes ī, from the earlier change of *ai to *ē/ī. This resulted in new sequences of velars followed by front vowels, where they did not occur before. Additionally, some new loanwords also had such sequences.

However, Proto-Slavic was still operating under the system of syllabic synharmony. Therefore, the language underwent the second regressive palatalization, in which velar consonants preceding the new (secondary) phonemes *ē and *ī, as well as *i and *e in new loanwords, were palatalized. As with the progressive palatalization, these became palatovelar. Soon after, palatovelar consonants from both the progressive palatalization and the second regressive palatalization became sibilants:

- *ḱ → *c ([ts])
- *ǵ → *dz (→ *z in most dialects)
- *x́ → *ś → *s/*š

In noun declension, the second regressive palatalization originally figured in two important Slavic stem types: o-stems (masculine and neuter consonant-stems) and a-stems (feminine and masculine vowel-stems). This rule operated in the o-stem masculine paradigm in three places: before nominative plural and both singular and plural locative affixes.

		'wolf'	'horn'	'spirit'
Nominative	singular	*vьlkъ	*rogъ	*duxъ
Nominative	plural	*vьlci	*rozi	*duśi
Locative	singular	*vьlcě	*rozě	*duśě
Locative	plural	*vьlcěxъ	*rozěxъ	*duśěxъ

=== Progressive palatalization ===
An additional palatalization of velar consonants occurred in Common Slavic times, formerly known as the third palatalization but now more commonly termed the progressive palatalization due to uncertainty over when exactly it occurred. Unlike the other two, it was triggered by a preceding vowel, in particular a preceding *i or *ī, with or without an intervening *n. Furthermore, it was probably disallowed before consonants and the high back vowels *y, *ъ. The outcomes are exactly the same as for the second regressive palatalization, i.e. alveolar rather than palatoalveolar affricates, including the East/West split in the outcome of palatalized *x:

- *k → *c ([ts])
- *g → *dz (→ *z in most dialects)
- *x → *ś → *s/*š

Examples:

- *atiku(s) 'father' (nom. sg.) → *aticu(s) → (with vowel fronting) Late Common Slavic *otьcь
- Proto-Germanic *kuningaz 'king' → Early Common Slavic *kuningu(s) → Late Common Slavic *kъnędzь
- *vixu(s) 'all' → *vьśь → *vьšь (West), *vьsь (East and South)

There is significant debate over when this palatalization took place and the exact contexts in which the change was phonologically regular. The traditional view is that this palatalization took place just after the second regressive palatalization (hence its traditional designation as the "third palatalization"), or alternatively that the two occurred essentially simultaneously. This is based on the similarity of the development to the second regressive palatalization and examples like *atike "father" (voc. sg.) → *otьče (not *otьce) that appear to show that the first regressive palatalization preceded the progressive palatalization.

A dissenting view places the progressive palatalization before one or both regressive palatalizations. This dates back to Pedersen (1905) and was continued more recently by Channon (1972) and Lunt (1981). Lunt's chronology places the progressive palatalization first of the three, in the process explaining both the occurrence of *otĭče and the identity of the outcomes of the progressive and second regressive palatalizations:

1. Progressive palatalization: *k > *ḱ (presumably a palatal stop) after *i(n) and *j
2. First regressive palatalization: *k/*ḱ > *č before front vowels
3. Fronting of back vowels after palatal consonants
4. Monophthongization of diphthongs
5. Second regressive palatalization: *k/*ḱ > *c before front vowels

(similarly for *g and possibly *x)

Significant complications to all theories are posed by the Old Novgorod dialect, known particularly since the 1950s, which has no application of the second regressive palatalization and only partial application of the progressive palatalization (to *k and sometimes *g, but not to *x).

More recent scholars have continued to argue in favor of the traditional chronology, and there is clearly still no consensus.

The three palatalizations must have taken place between the 2nd and 9th century. The earlier date is the earliest likely date for Slavic contact with Germanic tribes (such as the migrating Goths), because loanwords from Germanic (such as *kъnędzь "king" mentioned above) are affected by all three palatalizations. On the other hand, loan words in the early historic period (c. 9th century) are generally not affected by the palatalizations. For example, the name of the Varangians, from Old Norse Væringi, appears in Old East Slavic as варѧгъ varęgъ, with no evidence of the progressive palatalization (had it followed the full development as *kuningaz did, the result would have been **varędzь instead). The progressive palatalization also affected vowel fronting; it created palatal consonants before back vowels, which were then fronted. This does not necessarily guarantee a certain ordering of the changes, however, as explained above in the vowel fronting section.

=== Accentual developments ===
The Baltic languages, as well as conservative Slavic languages like Serbo-Croatian, have a complex accentual system with short and long vowels in all syllables, a free pitch accent that can fall on any syllable, and multiple types of pitch accent. (Vowel length is normally considered a separate topic from accent, but in the Slavic languages in particular, the two are closely related, and are usually treated together.) Not surprisingly, the historical development of accent in the Slavic languages is complex and was one of the last areas to be clearly understood. Even now, there is no complete consensus.

The Balto-Slavic languages inherited from PIE a free, mobile pitch accent:

1. There was (at most) a single accented syllable per word, distinguished by higher pitch (as in e.g. Mohawk) rather than greater dynamic stress (as in English).
2. The accent was free in that it could occur on any syllable, and was phonemic (i.e. its position could not be automatically predicted).
3. The accent was mobile in that its position could potentially vary among closely related words within a single paradigm.

In inflectional paradigms, Proto-Slavic inherited the distinction between fixed-accented and mobile-accented paradigms from Proto-Balto-Slavic.

==== Acute, pitch and vowel length ====
Proto-Balto-Slavic "long" syllables could have an additional feature known as "acute". This feature was inherited by Proto-Slavic, and was still present on all syllables throughout the Middle Common Slavic period. At this time, this distinction could occur on the following syllable types:

- Those containing the long vowels *a *ě *i *u *y.
- Those containing the nasal vowels *ę *ǫ.
- Those containing a liquid diphthong.

When accented, acuted vowels developed a rising intonation, while non-acuted long vowels became falling in pitch. Short vowels, i.e. the vowels *e *o *ь *ъ, did not have distinctive intonations, but developed different pitch contours in different positions in the word. In the first syllable of the word, the pitch was falling, while in non-initial syllables the pitch was rising.

The development of vowel length in Proto-Slavic remains controversial, with different linguists and linguistic schools holding different positions on the matter. Traditionally, it is held that Late Common Slavic retained the original distribution of short and long vowels, as it was inherited from Proto-Balto-Slavic. Under this position, vowel length was an automatic consequence of vowel quality, with *e *o *ь *ъ being always short, and all other vowels, including nasal vowels and liquid diphthongs, being always long. The decoupling of length from quality is ascribed to the post-Common Slavic period.

Linguists of the Leiden accentological school, on the other hand, posit accentual changes that disrupted the original distribution of length, so that length became independent of quality. The most important early changes are:

1. The loss of the acute feature in all syllables, except in accented syllables and syllables that immediately followed the accent. The length of these syllables was retained.
2. The loss of the acute feature in syllables immediately following the accent, this time with shortening of the vowel.
3. Loss of all length distinctions in syllables preceding the accent.
4. Shortening of acuted accented syllables. The acute feature was converted into short rising pitch contour, while non-acuted long syllables received a long falling intonation.
5. Van Wijk's law: Lengthening of vowels (except for yers and nasal vowels) following palatal consonants. This led to the increased occurrence of long vowels in the endings of jā and jo stems, which had consequences for Ivšić's law. Some of these long vowels were later shortened by analogy, especially in endings that were unstressed in the mobile paradigm.
6. Loss of *j between two unaccented vowels, resulting in contraction of the adjacent syllables into a long vowel. This occurred only in some languages, especially Czech, and did not occur at all in Russian. This, again, affected Ivšić's law, which retracted the accent from these contracted long vowels but not from the uncontracted vowels.
7. Eventual loss of length in final syllables in most languages. However, the former long vowels are reflected to some extent in Slovene and Serbo-Croatian, and more directly by the neo-circumflex accent in Slovene, which developed early on from former acute-register syllables when followed by a long syllable or internal yer.

==== Meillet's law ====
According to Meillet's law, words with a mobile accent paradigm lost the acute feature in the first syllable of the word, if there was one. Such words consequently do not show any difference in intonation in forms where the accent is on the first syllable; the pitch is always falling. Where the accent is on a non-initial syllable, the distinction is maintained.

==== Dybo's law ====
Dybo's law was the first of the major accent shifts in Proto-Slavic. In fixed-accent inflectional paradigms, non-acute syllables (both short and long) lost the accent to the following syllable. This caused a split in the fixed-accented paradigms, between the acuted "accent paradigm a", which retained the accent on the stem of the word, and the non-acuted "accent paradigm b", where the accent had shifted onto the inflectional ending.

In the traditional interpretation, the newly-accented syllable retained its acuteness until this point, and became rising or falling in pitch accordingly. Following the Leiden school, a formerly accented long syllable remained distinctively long, resulting in new long vowels before the accent. Newly accented long vowels gained a falling tone, while short vowels (whether originally short or shortened acute) received a rising tone.

Dybo's law occurred before the loss of *j between unstressed vowels, and could shift the accent onto the resulting long vowel. The accent would then be retracted again by Ivšić's law.

==== Havlík's law, Ivšić's law and the neoacute accent ====
During the Late Common Slavic period, the short close vowels *ь *ъ (known as yers) developed into "strong" and "weak" variants according to Havlík's law. The weak variants could no longer be accented, and if they were accented before, the accent was retracted onto the preceding syllable if there was one. This change is known as Ivšić's law or Stang's law. The newly-accented syllable gained a new type of rising accent, termed the neoacute.

Example:

- Early Slavic *sȃndu(s) "court of law, trial" > Middle Common Slavic *sǫ̂dъ > MCS *sǫdъ̀ (by Dybo's law) > Late Common Slavic *sǫ̃dъ (= *sǫ́dъ) > Čakavian (Vrgara) sũd (G sg sūdȁ), Russian sud (G sg sudá).

The neoacuted vowel could be either short or long, depending on the original length of the syllable before the retraction. The short neoacute is denoted with a grave accent (ò), while the long neoacute is variously written with an acute accent (á, following Serbo-Croatian and Slovene notation) or with a tilde (ã, following Chakavian notation). In West Slavic (except southern Slovak), short e and o gaining the neoacute were automatically lengthened.

Retraction also occurred from long falling ("circumflex") vowels, such as in the following cases:

1. In verbs with a present tense in *-i(tь), e.g.:
  - MCS *nosȋ(tь) "s/he carries" > *nòsi(tь) > Russian но́сит nósit
2. From a vowel immediately preceded by an original *j, i.e. where van Wijk's law operated:
  - PSl. *venzjè(ti) "s/he ties" > MCS *vęžè(tь) > LCS *vę̃že(tь) > Russian вя́жет v'ážet
  - MCS *voljà "will" > *vol'à > LCS *võl'a > Russian dialectal vôlja

Ivšić's law produced different results in different Slavic dialects. In languages that show long vowels through loss of *j, followed by a shift of the accent onto the long vowel by Dybo's law, the accent is retracted again by Ivšić's law. In languages that retain *j, the accent is shifted forward by Dybo's law, but then remains there if the vowel is short.

After these changes, falling pitch could only occur on the first syllable of the word, where it contrasted with rising pitch. In non-initial syllables, all accented syllables were rising in pitch. The complicated accentual patterns produced by Ivšić's law were levelled to some degree already within Common Slavic. In jā-stems this resulted in neoacute on the stem in all forms, and in jo-stems in all plural forms.

== See also ==
- Balto-Slavic languages
- Glossary of sound laws in the Indo-European languages § Slavic
- History of the Slavic languages
- Old Church Slavonic
- Proto-Balto-Slavic language
- Proto-Slavic accent
- Slavic liquid metathesis and pleophony
