= Sebbirozi =

The Sebbirozi was a tribe mentioned by the 9th-century Bavarian Geographer (BG). It states that the Sebbirozi inhabit 90 settlements (Sebbirozi habent civitates XC).

Linguist Aleksander Brückner related Sebbirozi with another tribe from the source, Zabrozi, deriving from Proto-Polish *sebr (Old Polish siebr and siabr, or szabr), transcribing to what he believed as true names *sebracy and *siabracy. Historian Henryk Łowmiański and linguist Stanisław Rospond connected the ethnonym to the Severians, while the others to the Sabirs. More recently, Krzysztof Tomasz Witczak also treats the Sebbirozi as one of the five Turkic tribes from the source, precisely the Sabirs. Already in 1958 Łowmiański considered etymological and geographical relation between the Sebbirozi, Attorozi, Uuillerozi, Zabrozi, Chozirozi due to unusual non-Slavic, yet Turkic suffix -rozi. The Attorozi themselves are described as populus ferocissimus.
