= Severians =

East Slav ethnic group

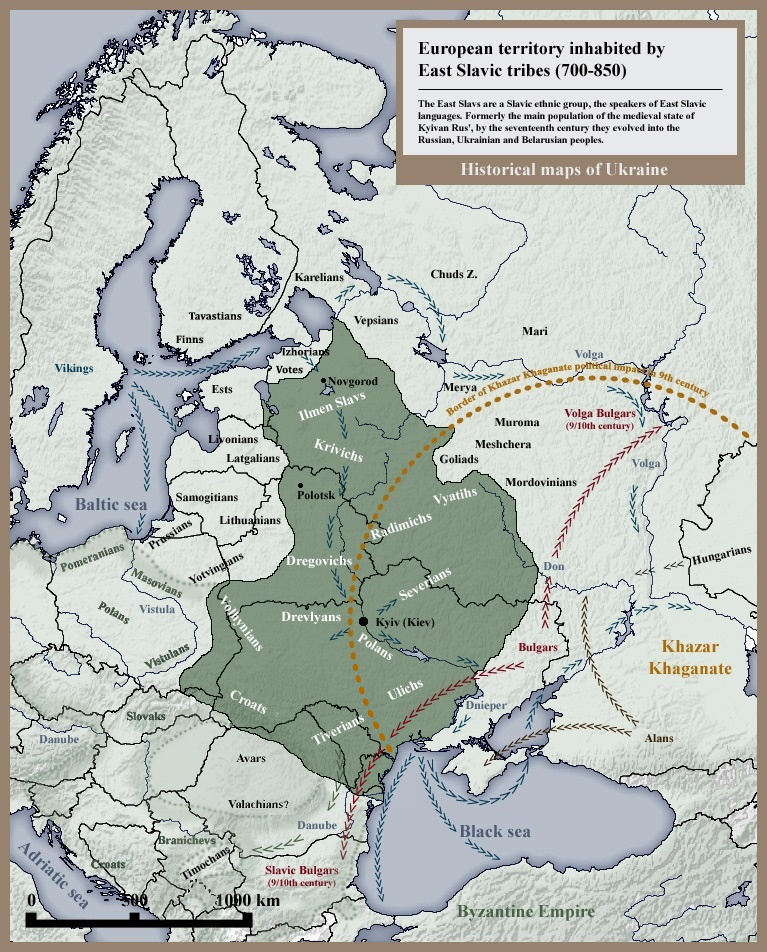
European territory inhabited by East Slavic tribes in 8th and 9th century.

The Severians, also Severyans, Siverians, or Siverianians (Belarusian: Севяране; Bulgarian: Севери; Russian: Северяне; Ukrainian: Сiверяни, romanized: Siveriany) were a tribe or tribal confederation of early East Slavs occupying areas to the east of the middle Dnieper River and southeast of the Danube River. They are mentioned by the Bavarian Geographer (9th century), Emperor Constantine VII (956–959), the Khazar ruler Joseph (c. 955), and in the Primary Chronicle (1113).

== Ethnonym ==
The etymology of the name "Severian" is uncertain. The name of the Severia region originated from the Slavic tribes. One theory proposes derivation from the Slavic word for "north" (sěver; men of the north), but the Severians never were the northernmost tribe of Slavs. Another theory proposes an Iranic derivation, from the name of the Sarmatian Seuer tribe (seu meaning "black"). Some scholars have argued that Jews called this tribe the Sawarta, based on the Kievan Letter (c. 930), written in Hebrew as SWRTH (read either as Sur'ata or Sever'ata), derived from Slavic sirota ("orphan"; in the letter, possibly meaning "convert"); or that the name "Severian" comes from the Magyar Savarti ("black"; possibly borrowed from Proto-Germanic swartaz). Based on the writings of the Bavarian Geographer, some scholars connect the ethnonym to the Zuierani, Zeriuani, or Sebbirozi (most probably the Sabirs).

== History ==
The Severians are believed to have continued the East Slavic tribal union along the middle Dnieper valley, after the political disappearance of the Antae and Dulebes, either independently or under Khazar policy. It is presumed they inhabited the lower Desna and upper Sejm and Sula rivers. They were thought to have been centered in Chernihiv ("black city"). However, as the Severians in the historical sources inhabited both the Dnieper valley and a part of the Danube valley, and as the Zeriuani realm was said to be so great that all Slavs traced their origins to it, Henryk Łowmiański believed that the Ruthenian Severians were the Slavic mother tribe. Professor Traian Stoianovich described the Severian Slavs as mix of Slavs and Slavicized formerly Turkic speaking Huns.

Some Severians settled in the territory of present-day northeastern Bulgaria, (Moesia Inferior, and Scythia Minor). According to Theophanes the Confessor, the Bulgars subjugated the so-called Seven Slavic tribes. One of these tribes, the Severeis, were resettled in the east "from the klisuras before Veregava" (ἀπό τῆς ἔμπροσθεν κλεισȣ́ρας Βερεγάβων), most likely the Rish Pass of the Balkan Mountains; while the other six tribes were resettled in the southern and western regions, as far the boundary with the Pannonian Avars. In 767, the Byzantines kidnapped the Severian prince Slavun, who had made trouble in Thrace, indicating they retained a tributary relationship with the Bulgars.

The other Severians had as neighbors the Radimichs, Krivichs, and Vyatichs in the north and the Derevlians and Polianians in the west. Those tribes had to pay tribute to the Khazars in 859 in the form of squirrel and beaver skins, which suggests they lived in or near the northern forests. In 884, Oleg of Novgorod annexed their territory to the Kievan Rus'. The Severians had to pay a "light tribute." According to Oleg, he had acted not against the Severians but against the Khazars. It is possible that the Severians accepted Oleg's rule because he imposed lower taxes on them.

Together with other East Slavic tribes, Severians participated in the Oleg's campaign against Constantinople in 907. In the 10th century, in his De Administrando Imperio, Constantine VII wrote that in winter, the Rus princes (archontes) moved to and were maintained in the lands of their Severian and Krivich tributaries. Eventually, Severian territory became part of the Grand Principality of Chernigov, and the last reference to them is from 1024, when they are mentioned as part of the troops recruited by Mstislav of Chernigov for his druzhina. They had a significant impact on the victory at the Battle of Listven (1024), especially against the Varangians.

Scholars disagree about the abovementioned dates. Some place Oleg's conquest in the 920–930s; the Khazar ruler Joseph (c. 955) mentioned that his empire ruled over the "Sever, Slaviun, and Ventit"; while Constantine VII wrote that the Severians paid tribute to the Rus and not the Khazars c. 950.

The Severians eventually came to be known as the Chernihovians and gave their name to the region of Severia.

== Culture ==
Archaeologists have found numerous rural settlements associated with the Severians, including burial mounds with cremated bodies, from the 8th–10th centuries. Like other East Slavs, the Severians were mostly engaged in agriculture; cattle breeding; hunting; and different handicrafts such as pottery, weaving, and metalworking. It is considered that trade was not very developed, and they offered honey, wax, furs, and slaves. According to Constantine VII, they provided not only tribute but also transport via boats dug out from single hollowed trees.

The Severians were a patriarchial culture ruled by clan or tribal leaders, who held political authority in the commune (zadruga) and convened tribal councils. The centers of political power were the fortified grady, which were built in forests or on elevations, around which villages developed. Some Saltovo-Mayaki forts were situated on Severian land.

In the Primary Chronicle, it is recorded that the Drevlians, Radimichs, Vyatichi, and Severians all lived violent lifestyles, and they did not enter monogamous marriages but practiced polygamy, specifically polygyny, instead.

== See also ==
- List of Medieval Slavic tribes
- Bibliography of Russian history
