= Znetalici =

Ancient Slavic tribe

Znetalici (Czech: Snětaliči) was a Slavic tribe mentioned by the 9th-century Bavarian Geographer. They are mentioned as inhabiting 74 civitates (settlements).

While some scholars put them either somewhere in Russia, between the Carpathians and the Danube, or in Kiev, the majority located them in Bohemia and near Lusatia. They are etymologically related to toponym Netolice in Bohemia, and Serbo-Lusatian tribe of Neletici or Netelici. Mikołaj Rudnicki considered it of patronymic origin with suffix *-ici, deriving it from *Snetal ("big trunk"), which has survived as surnames Snětal, Snětalová in the Czech Republic and Śniatała in Poland.

== Sources ==
- ČSAV (1956). Rozpravy Československé akademie věd: Řada společenských věd. Vol. 66. ČSAV. p. 35.
- Łowmiański, Henryk (1986). Studia nad dziejami Słowiańszczyzny, Polski i Rusi w wiekach średnich. Uniwersytet im. Adama Mickiewica w Poznaniu. pp. 171–172.
