= Buzan =

Buzan may refer to:

== People ==
- Buzan (Mongol khan), khan of the Chagatai Khanate
- Barry Buzan (born 1946), British political scientist
- Herman Bužan (1800–1862), Croatian politician
- Kimura Buzan (1876–1942), Japanese painter
- Lucian Buzan (born 1999), Romanian footballer
- Tony Buzan (1942–2019), English author

== Places ==
- Buzan, Ariège, a town in France
- Buzan, Astrakhan Oblast, Russia
- Buzan (river), a distributary of the Volga in Astrakhan Oblast, Russia
- Buzan, Iran, a village in Razavi Khorasan Province
- Buzan, Iraq, a village in Ninewa Governorate

== Other uses ==
- Buzan-ha, a Japanese Shingon Buddhist sect

== See also ==
- Busan (disambiguation)
- Buzhan (disambiguation)
