= Buzhan =

Buzhan (Persian: بوژان) may refer to:

- Buzhan, Ilam
- Buzhan, Razavi Khorasan

== See also ==
- Buzhans
- Buzan (disambiguation)
