= Volga =

River in Russia; longest river in Europe

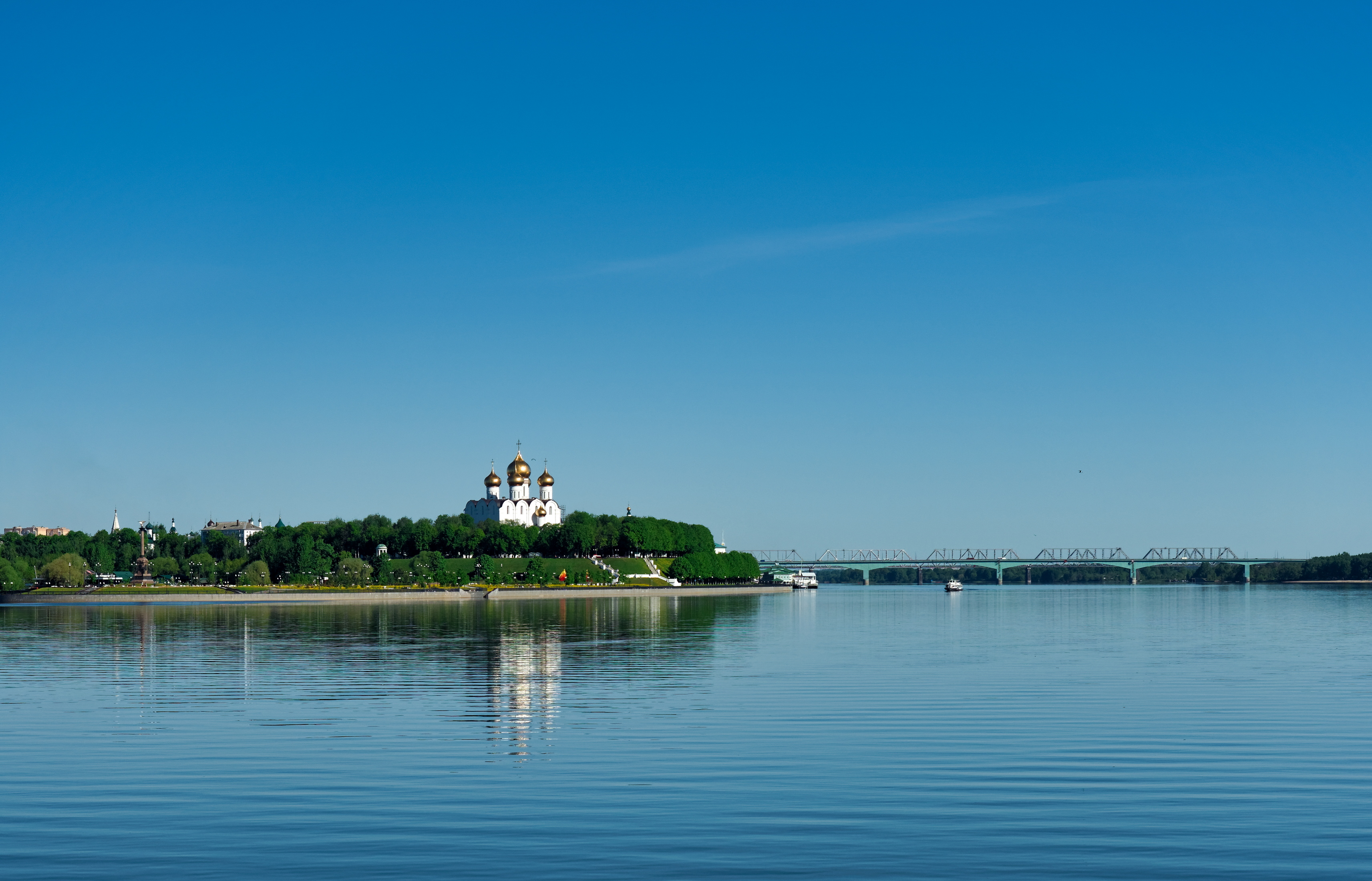
- The Volga at Yaroslavl

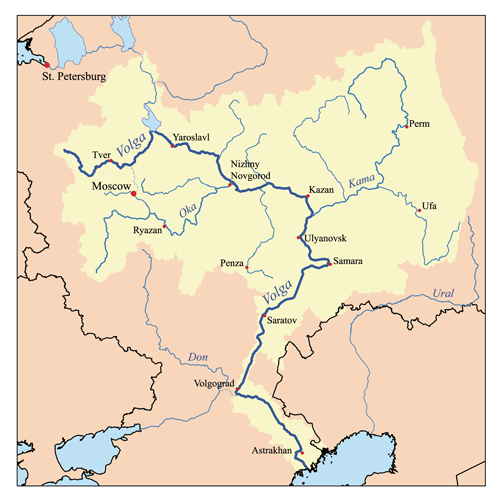
- The Volga drainage basin
- Etymology: Proto-Slavic *vòlga 'wetness'
- Native name: Волга (Russian)

Location
- Location: Eastern Europe
- Country: Russian Federation
- Federal subjects: Tver Oblast, Moscow Oblast, Yaroslavl Oblast, Kostroma Oblast, Ivanovo Oblast, Nizhny Novgorod Oblast, Mari El, Chuvashia, Tatarstan, Ulyanovsk Oblast, Samara Oblast, Saratov Oblast, Volgograd Oblast, Astrakhan Oblast, Kalmykia
- Cities: Tver, Yaroslavl, Nizhny Novgorod, Cheboksary, Kazan, Ulyanovsk, Samara, Saratov, Volgograd, Astrakhan, Togliatti

Physical characteristics
- Source
  - location: Valdai Hills, Tver Oblast
  - coordinates: 57°15′4.7″N 32°28′5.1″E
  - elevation: 228 m (748 ft)
- Mouth: Caspian Sea
  - location: Astrakhan Oblast
  - coordinates: 45°41′42″N 47°53′51″E
  - elevation: −28 m (−92 ft)
- Length: 3,531 km (2,194 mi)
- Basin size: 1,360,000 km^{2} (530,000 mi^{2}) 1,404,107.6 km^{2} (542,129.0 mi^{2})
- Discharge
  - location: Astrakhan (Basin size: 1,391,271.8 km^{2} (537,173.0 sq mi)
  - average: 8,060 m^{3}/s (285,000 cu ft/s) 8,103.078 m^{3}/s (286,157.5 cu ft/s) Volga Delta: 8,110.544 m^{3}/s (286,421.2 cu ft/s)
  - minimum: 5,000 m^{3}/s (180,000 cu ft/s)
  - maximum: 48,500 m^{3}/s (1,710,000 cu ft/s)
- Discharge
  - location: Volgograd (Basin size: 1,359,396.8 km^{2} (524,866.0 sq mi)
  - average: 8,150 m^{3}/s (288,000 cu ft/s) 8,228.298 m^{3}/s (290,579.6 cu ft/s)
  - minimum: 5,090 m^{3}/s (180,000 cu ft/s)
  - maximum: 48,450 m^{3}/s (1,711,000 cu ft/s)
- Discharge
  - location: Samara (Basin size: 1,218,995.3 km^{2} (470,656.7 sq mi)
  - average: 7,680 m^{3}/s (271,000 cu ft/s) 7,785.921 m^{3}/s (274,957.2 cu ft/s)
- Discharge
  - location: Nizhny Novgorod (Basin size: 479,637.3 km^{2} (185,189.0 sq mi)
  - average: 2,940 m^{3}/s (104,000 cu ft/s) 2,806.467 m^{3}/s (99,109.4 cu ft/s) Yaroslavl (Basin size: 153,657.8 km^{2} (59,327.6 sq mi): 1,008.277 m^{3}/s (35,607.0 cu ft/s) Rybinsk (Basin size: 150,119.8 km^{2} (57,961.6 sq mi): 993.253 m^{3}/s (35,076.4 cu ft/s)
- Discharge
  - location: Tver (Basin size: 24,658.6 km^{2} (9,520.7 sq mi)
  - average: 176 m^{3}/s (6,200 cu ft/s) 186.157 m^{3}/s (6,574.1 cu ft/s)

Basin features
- Tributaries
  - left: Kama
  - right: Oka

The Volga (Russian: Волга, pronounced [ˈvolɡə]) is the longest river in Europe and the longest endorheic basin river in the world. Situated in Russia, it flows through Central Russia to Southern Russia and into the Caspian Sea. The Volga has a length of 3,531 km (2,194 mi), and a catchment area of 1,360,000 km^{2} (530,000 sq mi). It is also Europe's largest river in terms of average discharge at delta – between 8,000 and 8,500 cubic metres (280,000 and 300,000 ft^{3}) per second – and of drainage basin. It is widely regarded as the national river of Russia. The hypothetical old Russian state, the Rus' Khaganate, arose along the Volga c. 830 AD. Historically, the river served as an important meeting place of various Eurasian civilizations.

The river flows in Russia through forests, forest steppes and steppes. Five of the ten largest cities of Russia, including the nation's capital, Moscow, are located in the Volga's drainage basin. Because the Volga drains into the Caspian Sea, which is an endorheic body of water, the Volga does not naturally connect to any of the world's oceans.

Some of the largest reservoirs in the world are located along the Volga River. The river has a symbolic meaning in Russian culture – Russian literature and folklore often refer to it as Волга-матушка Volga-Matushka (Mother Volga).

== Name ==
The Russian hydronym Volga (Волга) derives from Proto-Slavic *vòlga 'wetness, moisture', which is preserved in many Slavic languages, vlaga (влага) 'moisture', Bulgarian vlaga (влага) 'moisture', Czech vláha 'dampness', Serbo-Croatian: vlaga (влага) 'moisture', Slovene vlaga 'moisture', Polish wilgoć 'moisture' and Macedonian vlaga (влага) 'moisture', among others.

The Scythian name for the Volga was Rahā, literally meaning 'wetness'. This is related to the Avestan name for a mythical stream, Raŋhā (𐬭𐬀𐬢𐬵𐬁), which means "wet" or "moisture", and was derived from Proto-Indo-European *h₁res- or *h₁ers-. This name can be compared to several Indo-Iranic terms, such as:

- Sogdian rʾk (𐽀𐼰𐼸) 'vein, blood vessel' (from Old Iranian *rahaka),
- Persian رگ rag 'vein,'
- Vedic Sanskrit rasā́ (रसा) 'dew, liquid, juice; mythical river'), which was also the name of a tributary of the Indus river.

The Scythian name survives in modern Moksha as Rav (Рав).

The Greek author Herodotus recorded two more ancient Iranic names of the Volga:

- Oaros (Ancient Greek: Ὄαρος, romanized: Óaros; Latin: Oarus), which was derived from Scythian *Varu, meaning "broad".
  - The Huns' name of the Dnieper river, Var, was also derived from Scythian *Varu.
- Araxes (Ancient Greek: Ἀράξης, romanized: Aráxēs; Latin: Araxes)

The Turkic peoples living along the river formerly referred to it as Itil or Atil. In modern Turkic languages, the Volga is known as İdel (Идел) in Tatar, Atăl (Атӑл) in Chuvash, Iźel in Bashkir, Edıl in Kazakh, and İdil in Turkish. The Turkic names go back to the ancient Turkic form "Etil/Ertil", the origin and meaning of which are not clear. Perhaps this form has a connection with the hydronym Irtesh.

The Turkic peoples associated the Itil's origin with the Kama. Thus, a left tributary to the Kama was named the Aq Itil ('White Itil'), which is joined by the Kara Itil ('Black Itil') at Ufa. The name Indyl (Indɨl) is used in the Cherkess language.

In Asia the river was known by its other Turkic name Sarı-su 'yellow water', but the Oirats also used their own name, Ijil mörön or 'adaptation river'. Presently the Mari, another Uralic group, call the river Jul (Юл), meaning 'way' in Tatar.

== Description ==
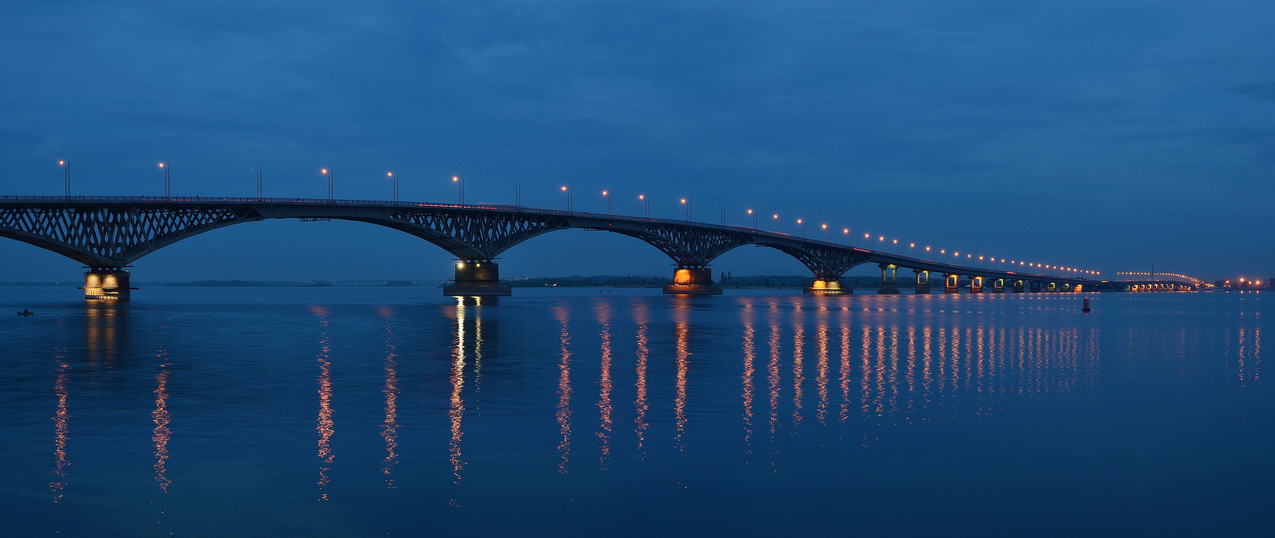
The Saratov Bridge by night, Saratov Oblast

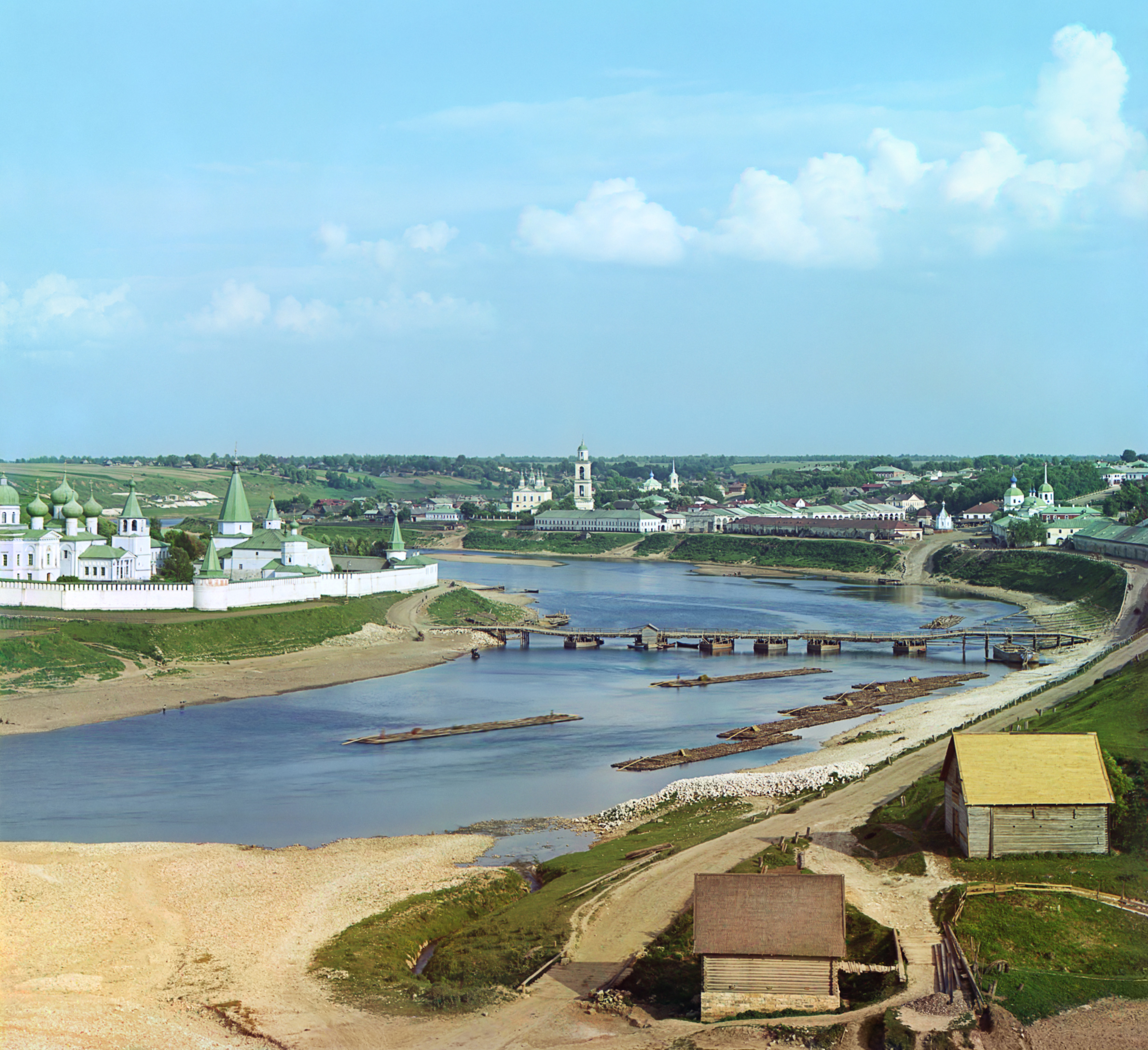
The upper Volga in the vicinity of Staritsa, 1912

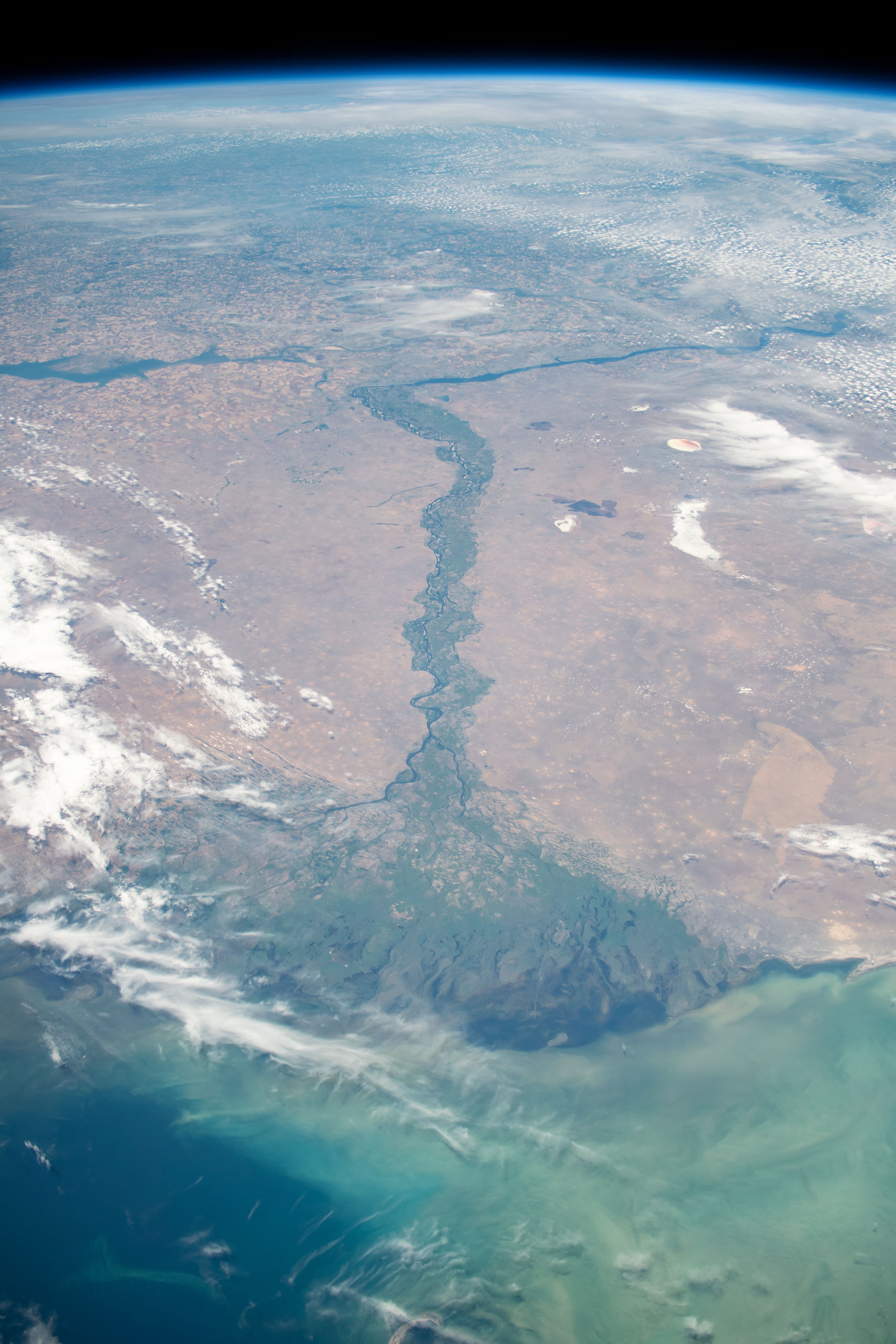
View of the Volga Delta from the International Space Station

The Volga is the longest river in Europe, and its catchment area is almost entirely inside Russia, though the longest river in Russia is the Ob–Irtysh river system. It belongs to the closed basin of the Caspian Sea, being the longest river to flow into a closed basin. The source of the Volga lies in the village of Volgoverkhov'e in Tver Oblast. Rising in the Valdai Hills 225 m (738 ft) above sea level northwest of Moscow and about 320 km (200 mi) southeast of Saint Petersburg, the Volga heads east past Lake Sterzh, Tver, Dubna, Rybinsk, Yaroslavl, Nizhny Novgorod, and Kazan. From there it turns south, flows past Ulyanovsk, Tolyatti, Samara, Saratov and Volgograd, and discharges into the Caspian Sea below Astrakhan at 28 m (92 ft) below sea level.

The Volga has many tributaries, most importantly the Kama, the Oka, the Vetluga, and the Sura. The Volga and its tributaries form the Volga river system, which flows through an area of about 1,350,000 km^{2} (520,000 sq mi) in the most heavily populated part of Russia. The Volga Delta has a length of about 160 km (99 mi) and includes as many as 500 channels and smaller rivers. The largest estuary in Europe, it is the only place in Russia where pelicans, flamingos, and lotuses may be found. The Volga freezes for most of its length for three months each year.

The Volga drains most of Western Russia. Its many large reservoirs provide irrigation and hydroelectric power. The Moscow Canal, the Volga–Don Canal, and the Volga–Baltic Waterway form navigable waterways connecting Moscow to the White Sea, the Baltic Sea, the Caspian Sea, the Sea of Azov and the Black Sea. High levels of chemical pollution have adversely affected the river and its habitats.

The fertile river valley provides large quantities of wheat and other agricultural produce, and also has many mineral riches. A substantial petroleum industry centers on the Volga valley. Other resources include natural gas, salt, and potash. The Volga Delta and the Caspian Sea are fishing grounds.

The Volga River basin serves as a major invasion corridor for aquatic species. Recent studies indicate that the proportion of alien fish species in the total catch varies significantly across the basin, reaching 36–47% in the Saratov and Kuibyshev reservoirs. A bidirectional, asymmetric expansion is observed: "southern" Ponto-Caspian and Azov-Black Sea species are actively moving northward into the reservoir cascade, while "northern" species (such as vendace and European smelt) are experiencing range regression, likely due to climate warming and rising water temperatures.

=== Confluences (downstream to upstream) ===
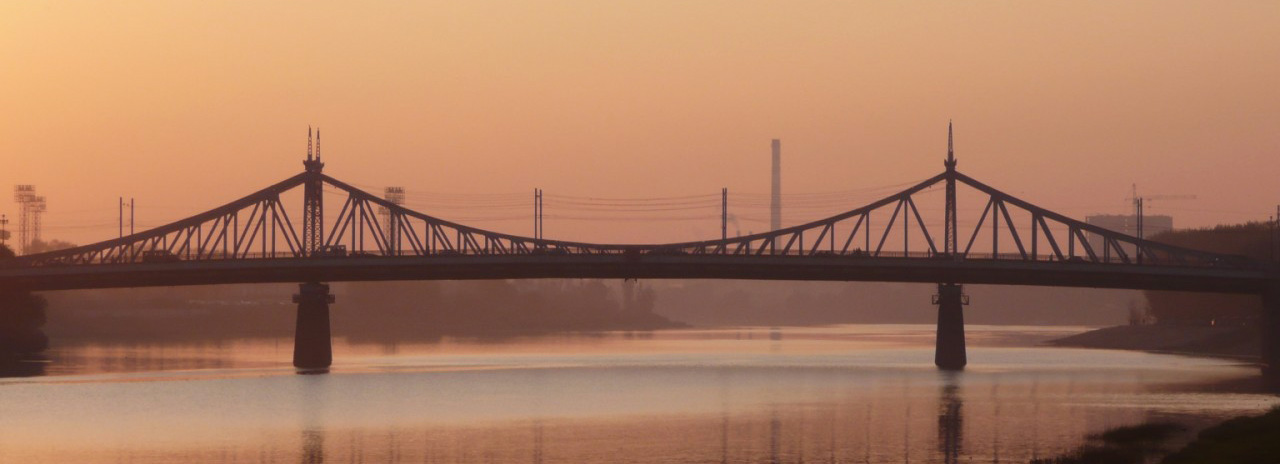
The Starovolzhsky Bridge in Tver

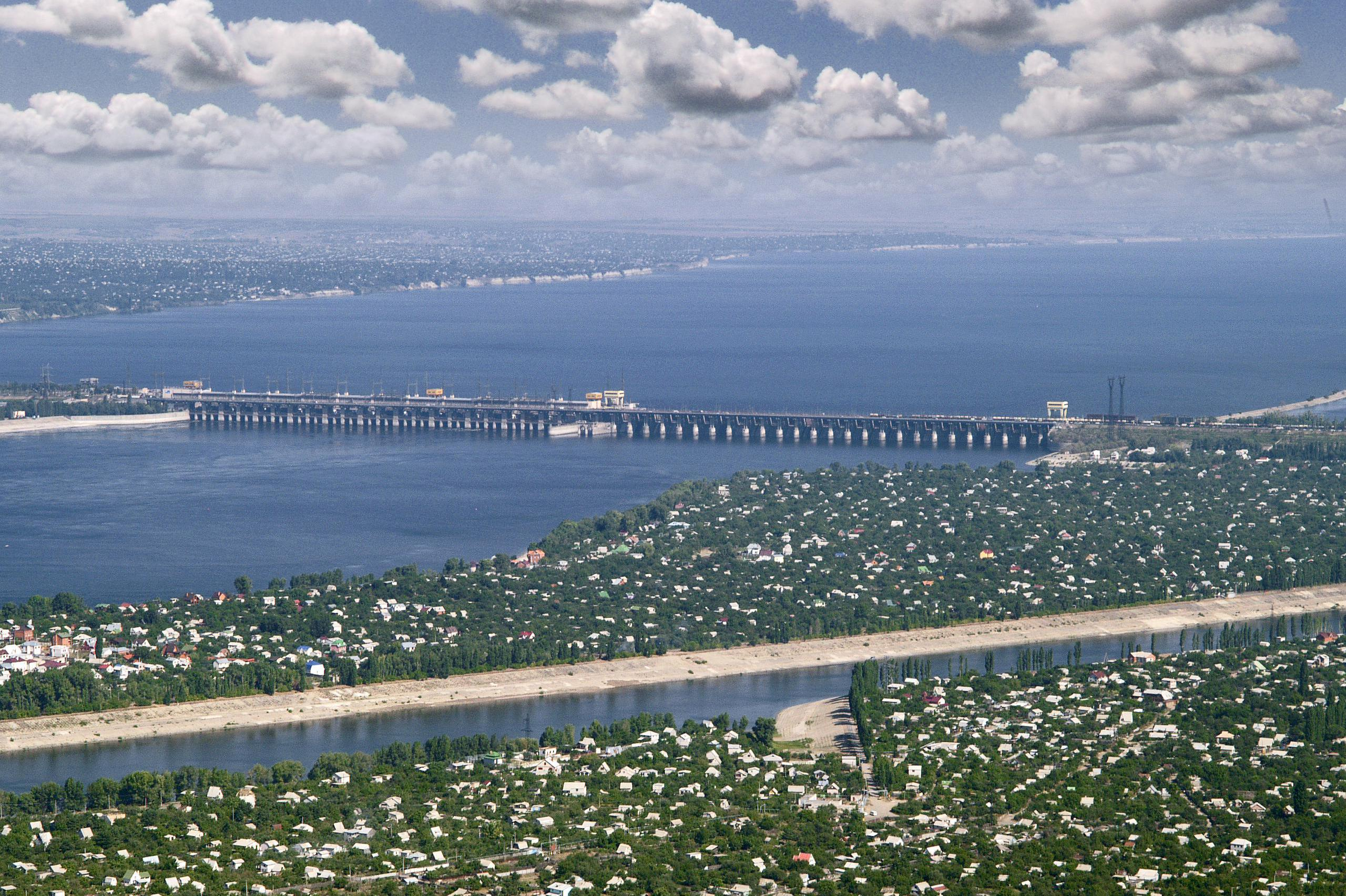
Volga Hydroelectric Station

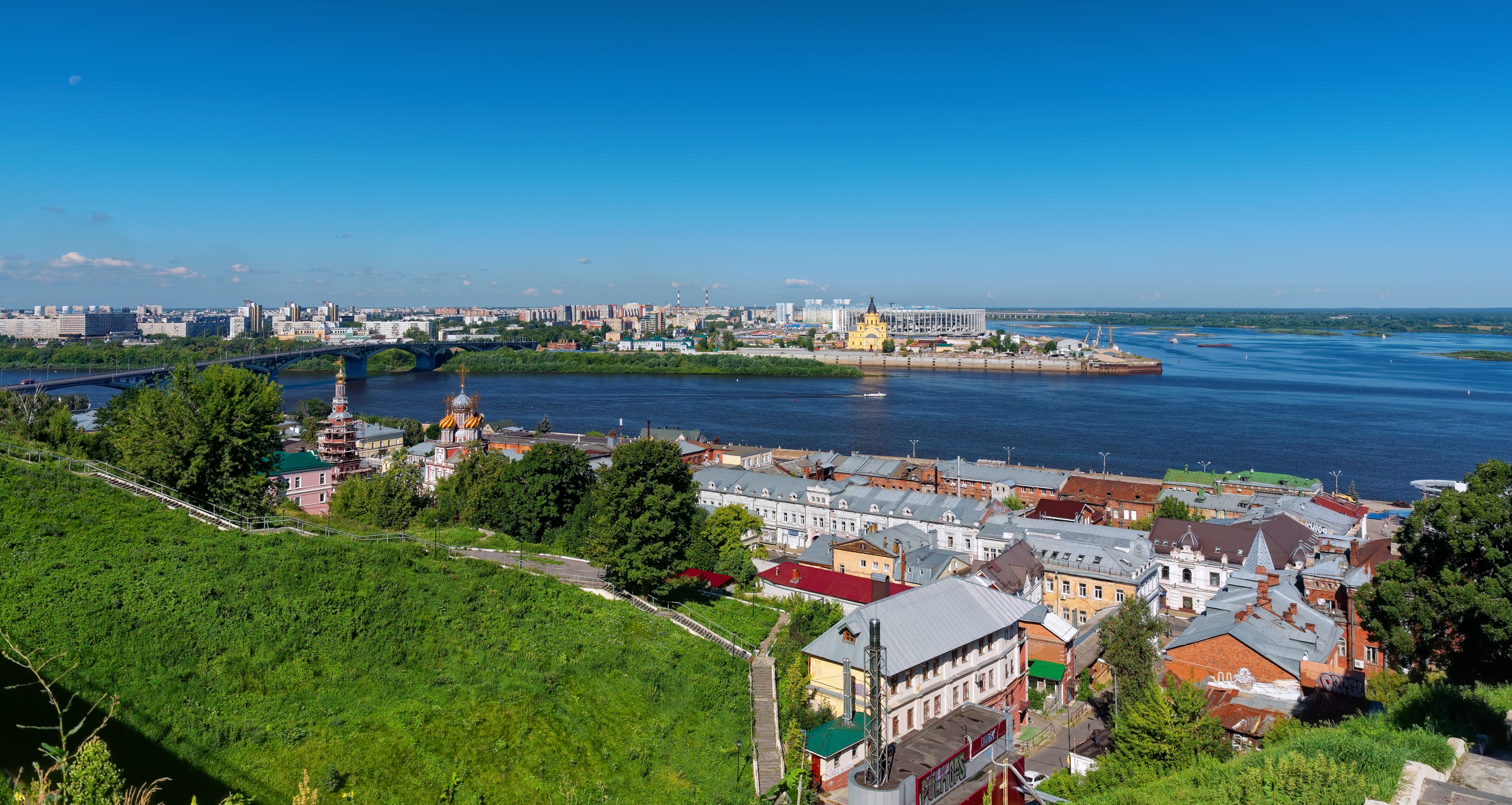
The confluence of the Oka (to the left) and the Volga in Nizhny Novgorod

- Akhtuba (near Volzhsky), a distributary
- Bolshoy Irgiz (near Volsk)
- Samara (in Samara)
- Kama (south of Kazan)
- Kazanka (in Kazan)
- Sviyaga (west of Kazan)
- Vetluga (near Kozmodemyansk)
- Sura (in Vasilsursk)
- Kerzhenets (near Lyskovo)
- Oka (in Nizhny Novgorod)
- Uzola (near Balakhna)
- Unzha (near Yuryevets)
- Kostroma (in Kostroma)
- Kotorosl (in Yaroslavl)
- Sheksna (in Cherepovets)
- Mologa (near Vesyegonsk)
- Kashinka (near Kalyazin)
- Nerl (near Kalyazin)
- Medveditsa (near Kimry)
- Dubna (in Dubna)
- Shosha (near Konakovo)
- Tvertsa (in Tver)
- Vazuza (in Zubtsov)
- Selizharovka (in Selizharovo)

=== Reservoirs (downstream to upstream) ===
A number of large hydroelectric reservoirs were constructed on the Volga during the Soviet era. They are:

- Volgograd Reservoir
- Saratov Reservoir
- Kuybyshev Reservoir – the largest in Europe by surface
- Cheboksary Reservoir
- Gorky Reservoir
- Rybinsk Reservoir
- Uglich Reservoir
- Ivankovo Reservoir

=== Biggest cities on the shores of the Volga ===
- Kazan
- Nizhny Novgorod
- Samara
- Volgograd
- Saratov
- Tolyatti
- Yaroslavl
- Astrakhan
- Ulyanovsk
- Cheboksary
- Tver

=== Bridges across the Volga ===
- Kostroma rail bridge

=== Human history ===
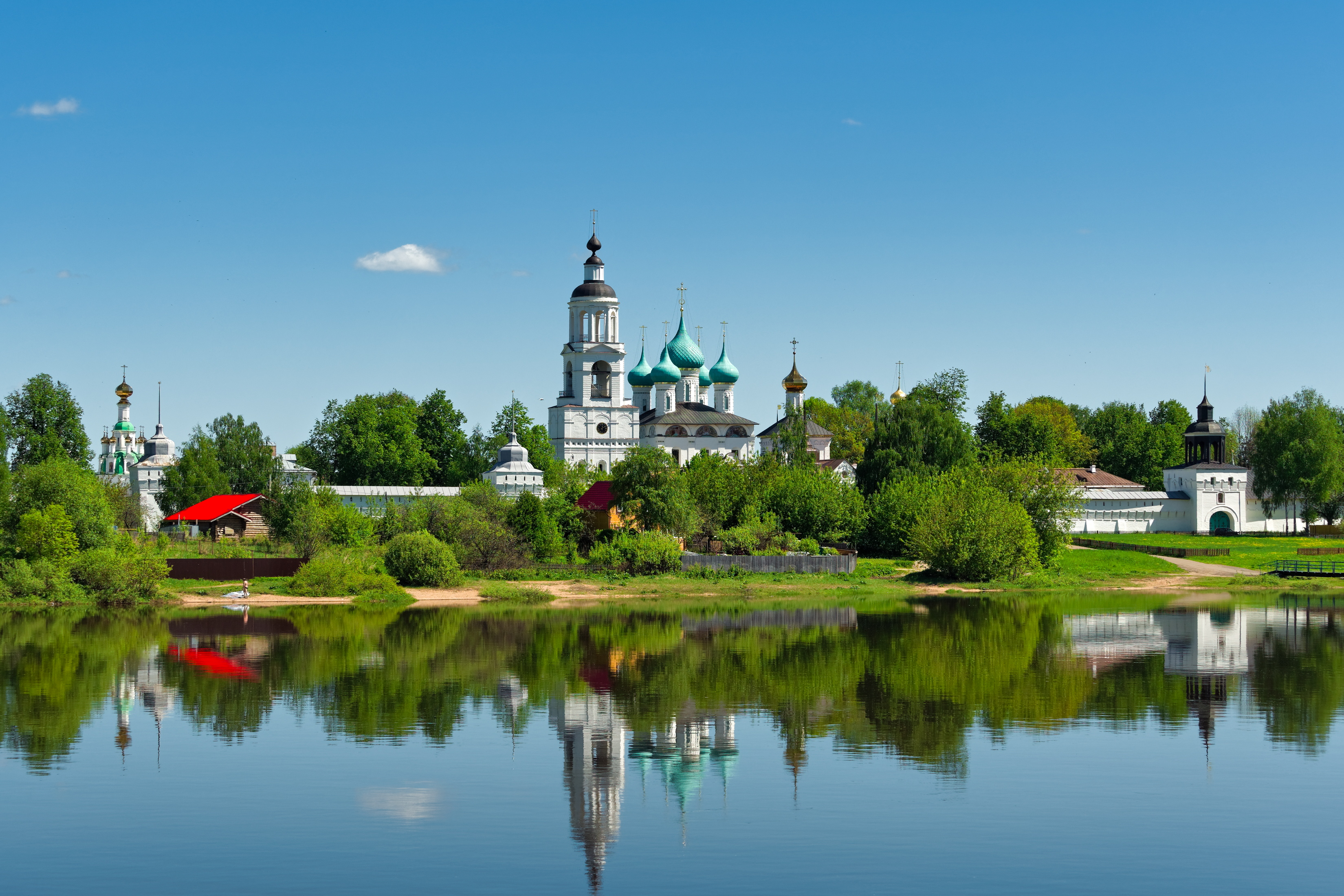
Many Orthodox shrines and monasteries are located along the banks of the Volga

The Volga–Oka region has been occupied for at least 9,000 years and supported a bone and antler industry for producing bone arrowheads, spearheads, lanceheads, daggers, hunters knives, and awls. The makers also used local quartz and imported flints.

During classical antiquity, the Volga formed the boundary between the territories of the Cimmerians in the Caucasian Steppe and the Scythians in the Caspian Steppe. After the Scythians migrated to the west and displaced the Cimmerians, the Volga became the boundary between the territories of the Scythians in the Pontic and Caspian Steppes and the Massagetae in the Caspian and Transcaspian steppes.

Between the 6th and the 8th centuries, the Alans settled in the Middle Volga region and in the steppes of Russia's southern region in the Pontic–Caspian steppe.

The area around the Volga was inhabited by the Slavic tribes of Vyatichs and Buzhans, by Finno-Ugric, Scandinavian, Baltic, Hunnic and Turkic peoples (Tatars, Kipchaks, Khazars) in the first millennium AD, replacing the Scythians. Furthermore, the river played a vital role in the commerce of the Byzantine people. The ancient scholar Ptolemy of Alexandria mentions the lower Volga in his Geography (Book 5, Chapter 8, 2nd Map of Asia). He calls it the Rha, which was the Scythian name for the river. Ptolemy believed the Don and the Volga shared the same upper branch, which flowed from the Hyperborean Mountains. Between 2nd and 5th centuries Baltic people were very widespread in today's European Russia. Baltic people were widespread from Sozh River till today's Moscow and covered much of today's Central Russia and intermingled with the East Slavs. The Russian ethnicity in Western Russia and around the Volga river evolved to a very large extent, next to other tribes, out of the East Slavic tribe of the Buzhans and Vyatichis. The Vyatichis were originally concentrated on the Oka River. Furthermore, several localities in Russia are connected to the Slavic Buzhan tribe, like for example Sredniy Buzhan in the Orenburg Oblast, Buzan and the Buzan River in the Astrakhan Oblast. Buzhan (Persian: بوژان, romanized: Būzhān; also known as Būzān) is also a village in Nishapur, Iran. In late 8th century the Russian state Russkiy Kaganate is recorded in different Northern and Oriental sources. The Volga was one of the main rivers of the Rus' Khaganates culture.

Subsequently, the river basin played an important role in the movements of peoples from Asia to Europe. A powerful polity of Volga Bulgaria once flourished where the Kama joins the Volga, while Khazaria controlled the lower stretches of the river. Such Volga cities as Atil, Saqsin, or Sarai were among the largest in the medieval world. The river served as an important trade route connecting Scandinavia, Finnic areas with the various Slavic tribes and Turkic, Germanic, Finnic and other people in Old Rus', and Volga Bulgaria with Khazaria, Persia and the Arab world.

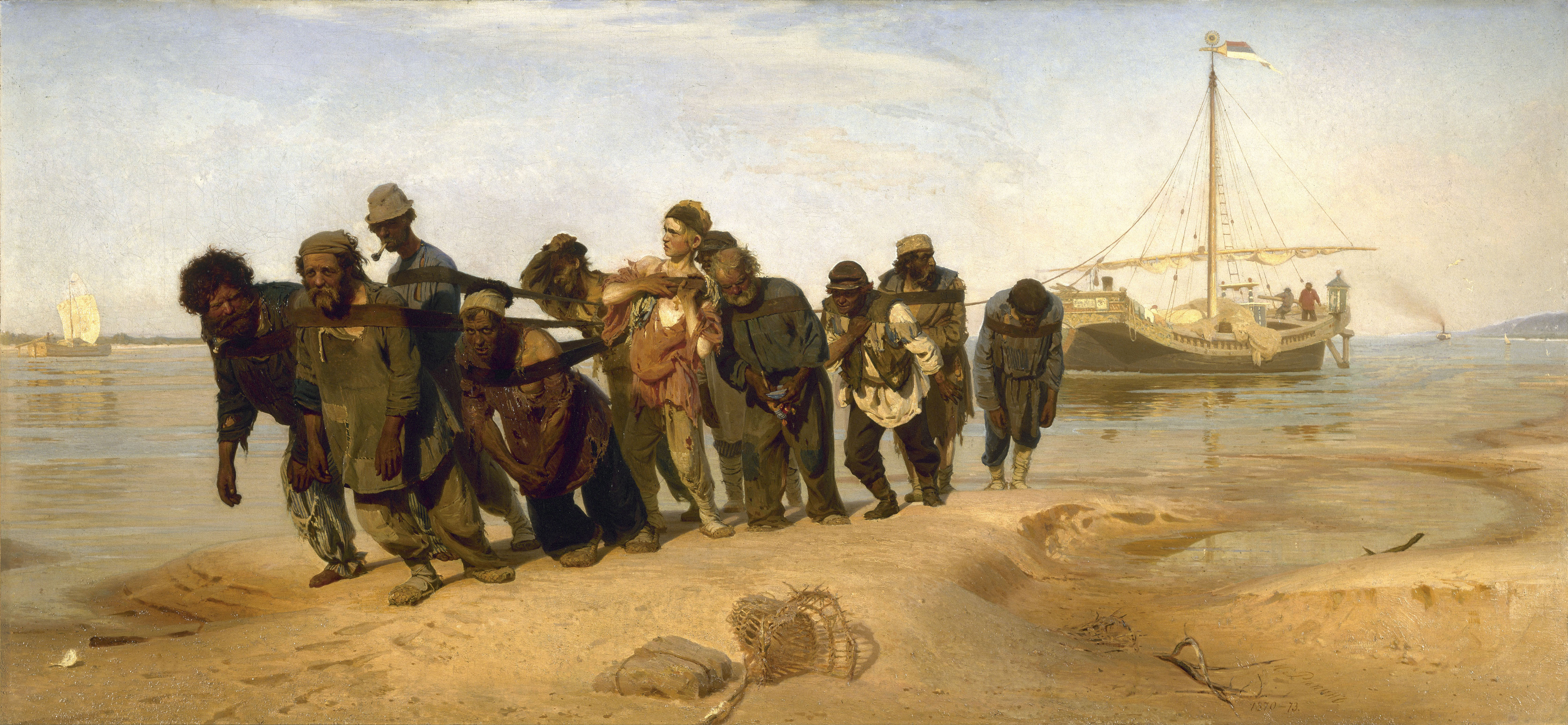
Ilya Yefimovich Repin's 1870–1873 painting Barge Haulers on the Volga

Khazars were replaced by Kipchaks, Kimeks and Mongols, who founded the Golden Horde in the lower reaches of the Volga. Later their empire divided into the Khanate of Kazan and Khanate of Astrakhan, both of which were conquered by the Russians in the course of the 16th century Russo-Kazan Wars. The Russian people's deep feeling for the Volga echoes in national culture and literature, starting from the 12th century Lay of Igor's Campaign. The Volga Boatman's Song is one of many songs devoted to the national river of Russia.

Construction of Soviet Union-era dams often involved enforced resettlement of huge numbers of people, as well as destruction of their historical heritage. For instance, the town of Mologa was flooded for the purpose of constructing the Rybinsk Reservoir (then the largest artificial lake in the world). The construction of the Uglich Reservoir caused the flooding of several monasteries with buildings dating from the 15th and 16th centuries. In such cases the ecological and cultural damage often outbalanced any economic advantage.

==== 20th-century conflicts ====
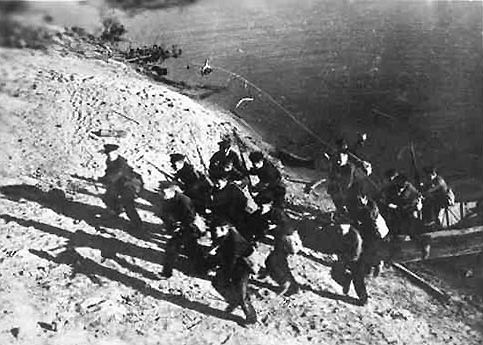
Soviet Marines charge the Volga river bank.

During the Russian Civil War, both sides fielded warships on the Volga. In 1918, the Red Volga Flotilla participated in driving the Whites eastward, from the Middle Volga at Kazan to the Kama and eventually to Ufa on the Belaya.

During the Civil War, Joseph Stalin ordered the imprisonment of several military specialists on a barge in the Volga and the sinking of a floating prison in which the officers perished.

During World War II, the city on the big bend of the Volga, currently known as Volgograd, witnessed the Battle of Stalingrad, possibly the bloodiest battle in human history, in which the Soviet Union and the German forces were deadlocked in a stalemate battle for access to the river. The Volga was (and still is) a vital transport route between central Russia and the Caspian Sea, which provides access to the oil fields of the Absheron Peninsula. Hitler planned to use access to the oil fields of Azerbaijan to fuel future German conquests. Apart from that, whoever held both sides of the river could move forces across the river, to defeat the enemy's fortifications beyond the river. By taking the river, Hitler's Germany would have been able to move supplies, guns, and men into the northern part of Russia. At the same time, Germany could permanently deny this transport route by the Soviet Union, hampering its access to oil and to supplies via the Persian Corridor.

For this reason, many amphibious military assaults were brought about in an attempt to remove the other side from the banks of the river. In these battles, the Soviet Union was the main offensive side, while the German troops used a more defensive stance, though much of the fighting was close quarters combat, with no clear offensive or defensive side.

== Ethnic groups ==
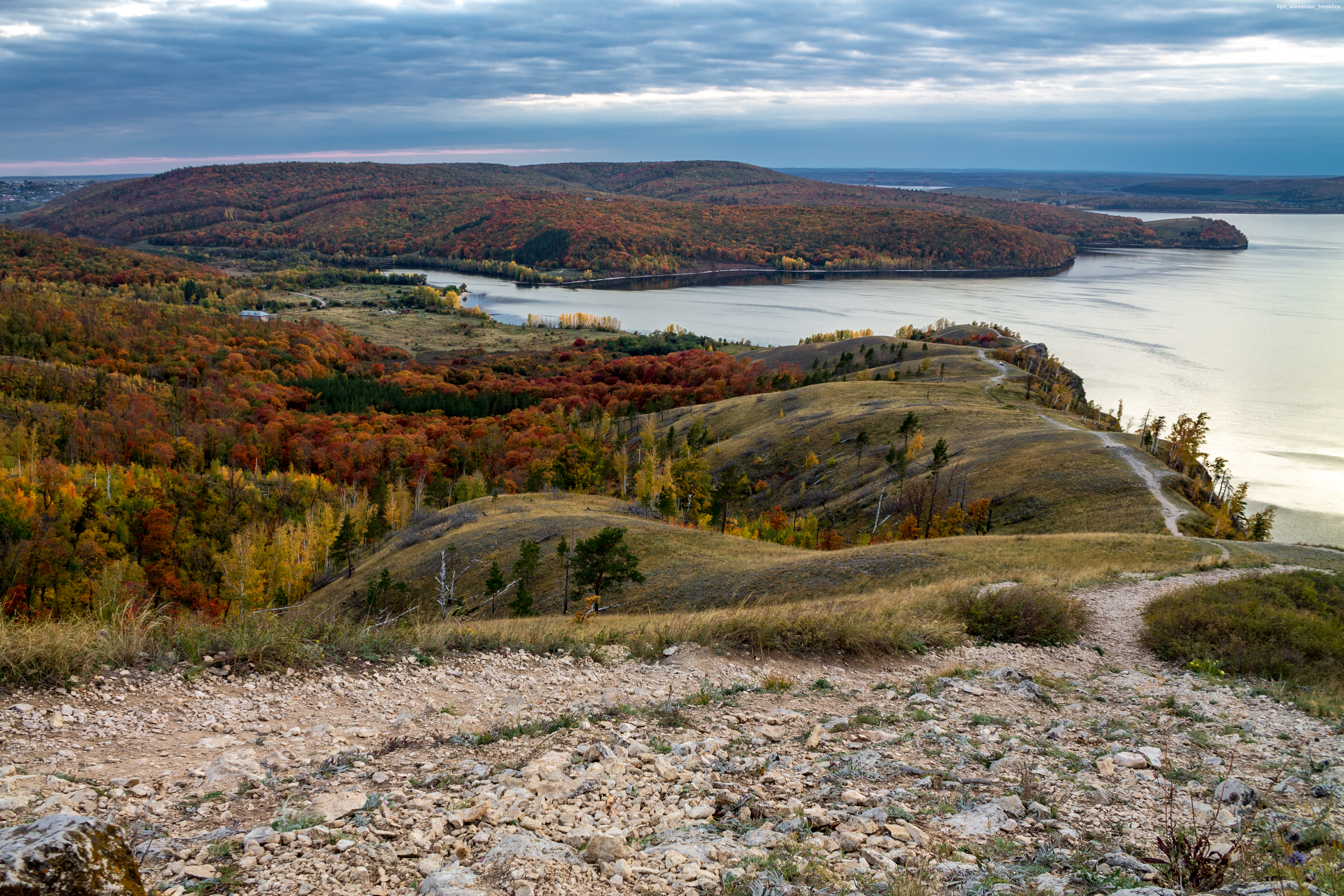
The Volga in the Zhiguli Mountains.

Many different ethnicities lived on the Volga river. Numerous were the Eastern Slavic Vyatchi tribes which took a decisive role in the development of modern Russians. Among the first recorded people along the upper Volga were also the Finnic Mari (Мари) and Merya (Мäрӹ) people. Where the Volga flows through the steppes the area was also inhabited by the Iranian people of the Sarmatians from 200 BC. Since ancient times, even before Rus' states developed, the Volga river was an important trade route where not only Slavic, Turkic and Finnic peoples lived, but also where the Arab world of the Middle East met the Varangian people of the Nordic countries through trade.

In the 8th and 9th centuries colonization began from Kievan Rus'. Slavs from Kievan Rus' brought Christianity to the upper Volga, and a portion of non-Slavic local people adopted Christianity and gradually became East Slavs. The remainder of the Mari people migrated to the east far inland. In the course of several centuries the Slavs assimilated the indigenous Finnic populations, such as the Merya, Meshchera and Muroma peoples. The surviving peoples of Volga Finnic ethnicity include the Maris, Erzyas and Mokshas of the middle Volga. Also Khazar and Bulgar peoples inhabited the upper, middle and lower of the Volga River basin.

Apart from the Huns, the earliest Turkic tribes arrived in the 7th century and assimilated some Finno-Ugric and Indo-European population on the middle and lower Volga. The Turkic Christian Chuvash and Muslim Volga Tatars are descendants of the population of medieval Volga Bulgaria. Another Turkic group, the Nogais, formerly inhabited the lower Volga steppes.

The Volga region is home to a German minority group, the Volga Germans. Catherine the Great had issued a manifesto in 1763 inviting all foreigners to come and populate the region, offering them numerous incentives to do so. This was partly to develop the region but also to provide a buffer zone between the Russians and the Mongols to the east. Because of conditions in German territories, Germans responded in the largest numbers. Under the Soviet Union a slice of the region was turned into the Volga German Autonomous Soviet Socialist Republic.

On 22 June 1941, Hitler started the German-Soviet War. On 28 August 1941, Stalin had the Presidium of the Supreme Soviet of the USSR pass a decree 'On the resettlement of Germans residing in the Volga region'. The approximately 400,000 remaining Volga Germans were accused of collective collaboration, deported to Siberia and Central Asia, and forced into labour camps of the 'Labour Army' (Трудармия); thousands of them died. Most Russian Germans (men and women) were 'conscripted' between October 1942 and December 1943.

In 1964, they were officially cleared of the accusation of collaboration, albeit with restrictions. (1964 marked the end of the Khrushchev era, which had begun in 1953 after Stalin's death. The Thaw period lasted from about 1956 to October 1964. The freedom of travel granted in 1972 allowed a return to the Volga, but explicitly not to the settlement inhabited before the deportation. This only became possible after the Dissolution of the Soviet Union.

== Navigation ==
The Volga, widened for navigation purposes with construction of huge dams during the years of Joseph Stalin's industrialization, is of great importance to inland shipping and transport in Russia: all the dams in the river have been equipped with large (double) ship locks, so that vessels of considerable dimensions can travel from the Caspian Sea almost to the upstream end of the river.

Connections with the river Don and the Black Sea are possible through the Volga–Don Canal. Connections with the lakes of the North (Lake Ladoga, Lake Onega), Saint Petersburg and the Baltic Sea are possible through the Volga–Baltic Waterway; and commerce with Moscow has been realised by the Moscow Canal connecting the Volga and the Moskva River.

This infrastructure has been designed for vessels of a relatively large scale (lock dimensions of 290 by 30 metres (951 ft × 98 ft) on the Volga, slightly smaller on some of the other rivers and canals) and it spans many thousands of kilometers. A number of formerly state-run, now mostly privatized, companies operate passenger and cargo vessels on the river; Volgotanker, with over 200 petroleum tankers, is one of them.

In the later Soviet era, up to the modern times, grain and oil have been among the largest cargo exports transported on the Volga. Until recently access to the Russian waterways was granted to foreign vessels on a very limited scale. The increasing contacts between the European Union and Russia have led to new policies with regard to the access to the Russian inland waterways.

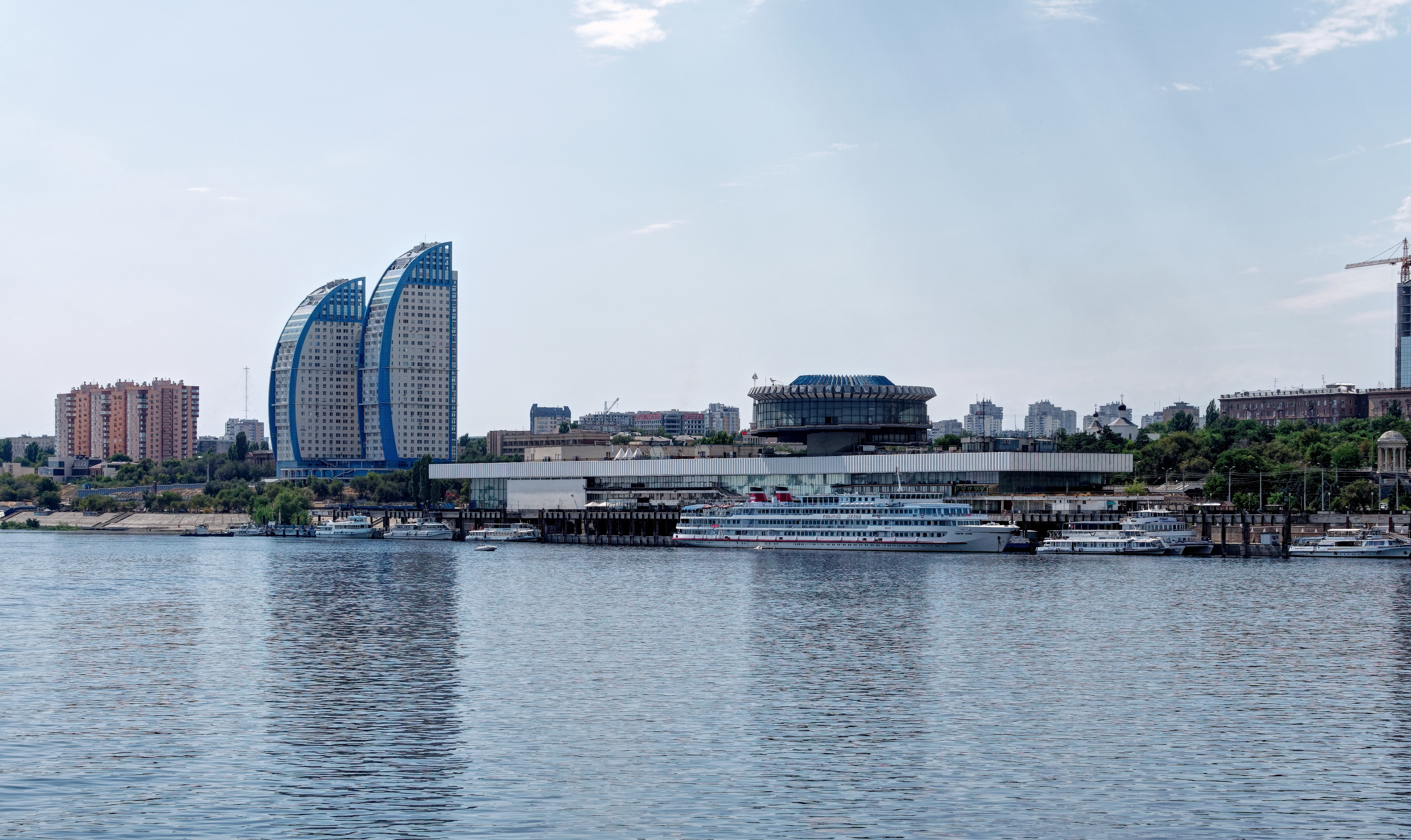
The Volga at Volgograd

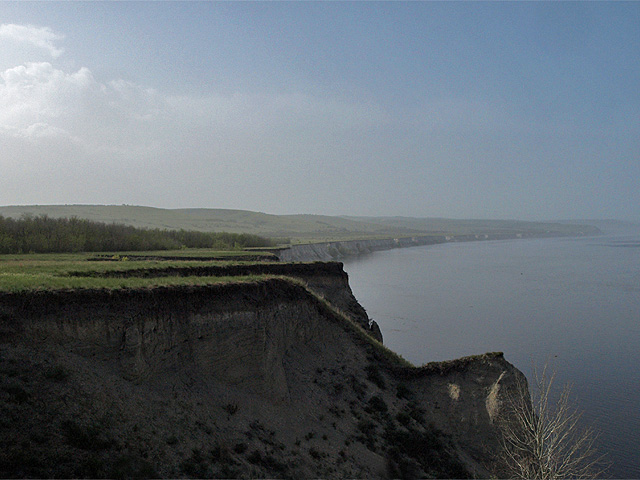
In some locations, the Volga has a rocky west bank.

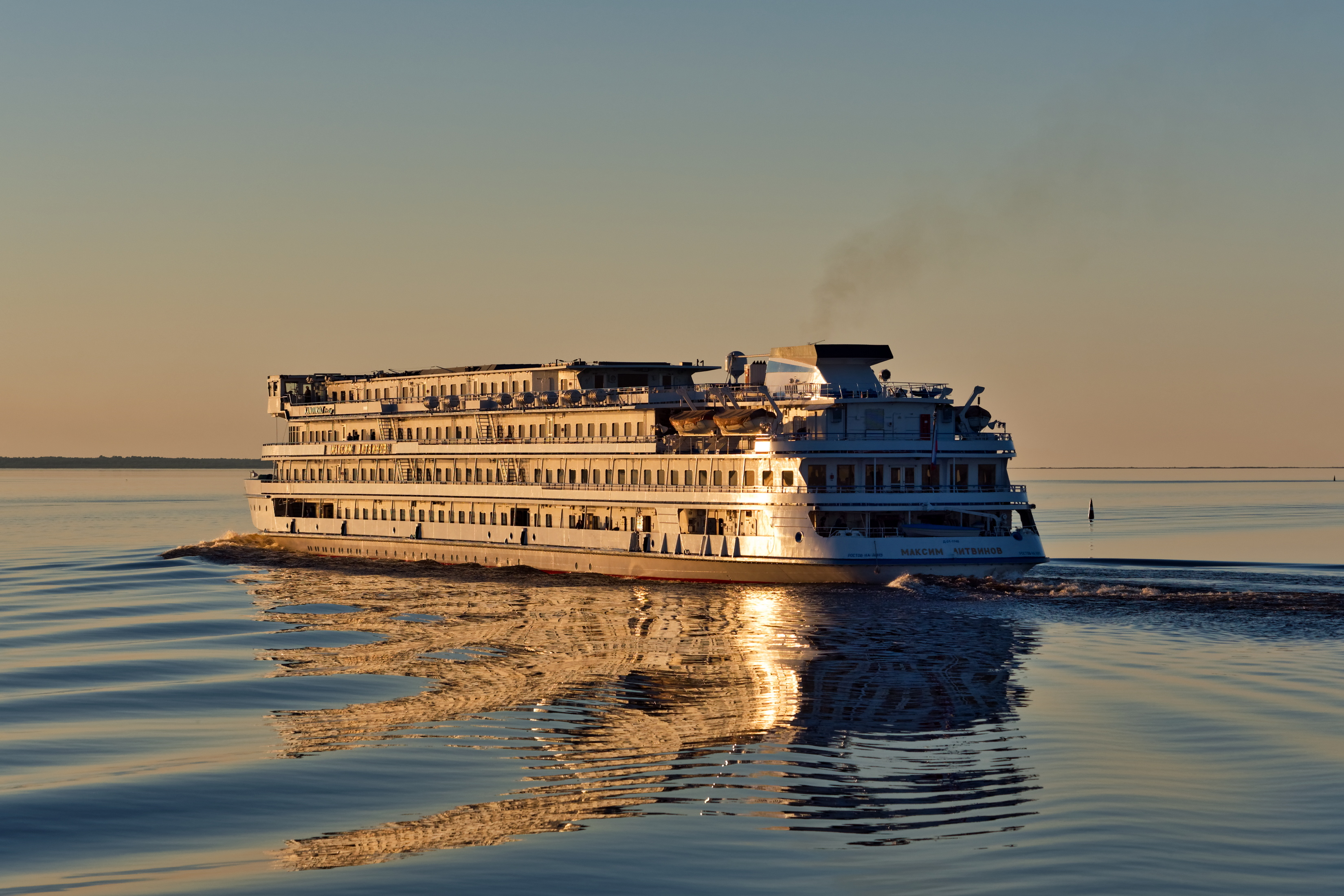
Cruise ship on the Volga.

== Satellite imagery ==
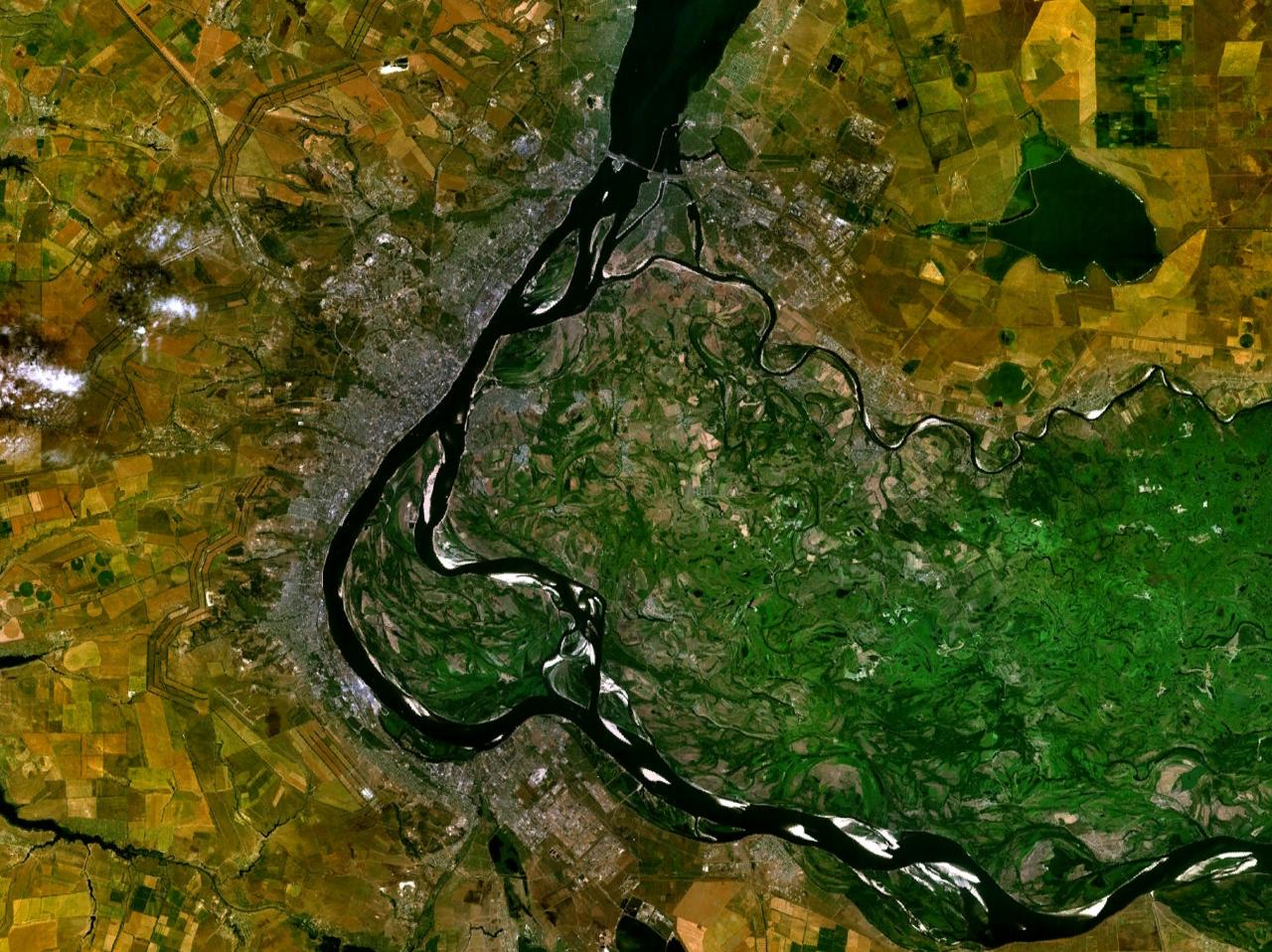
View of the river and Volgograd from space.

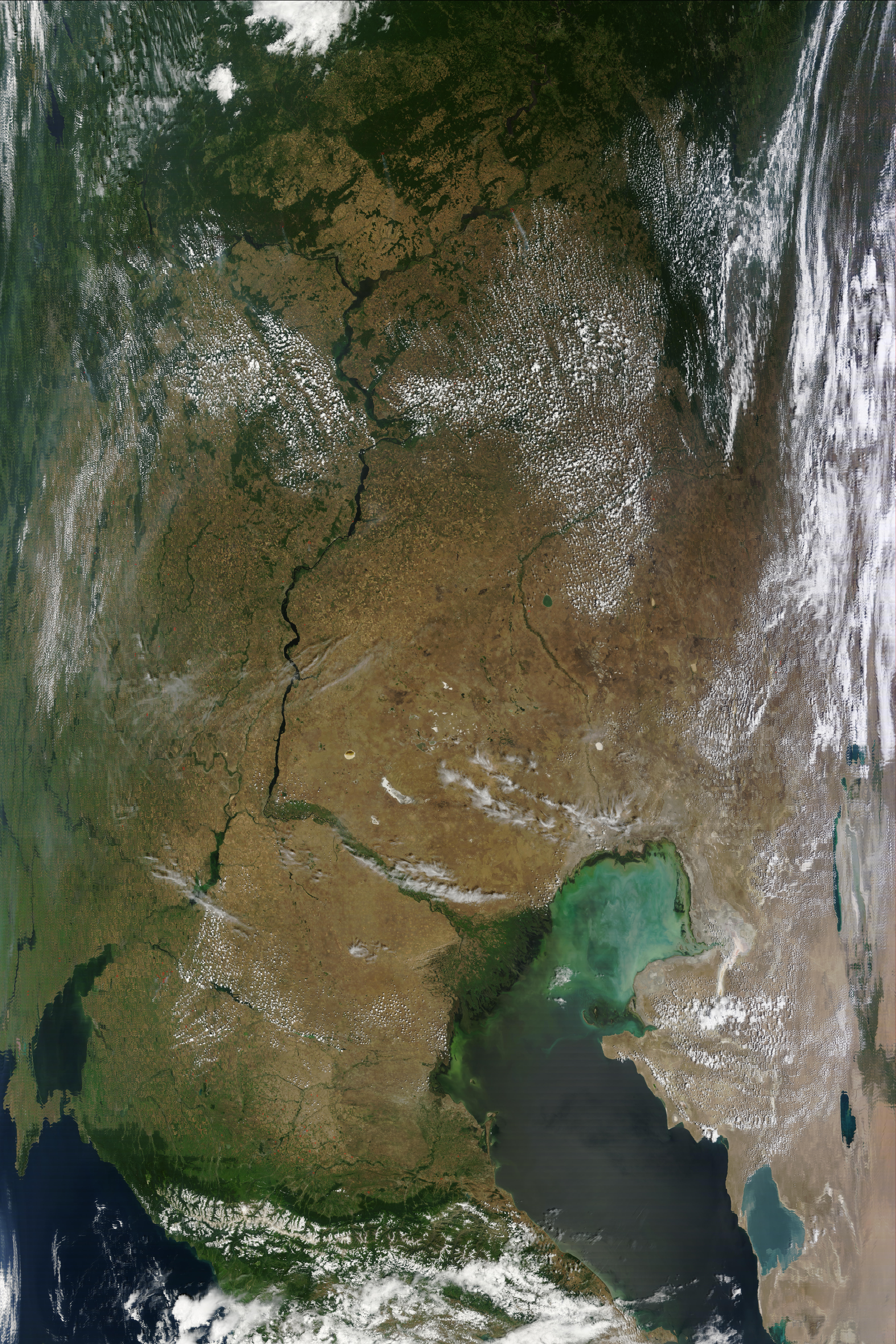
Volga river delta, Terra/MODIS 2010-07-17.

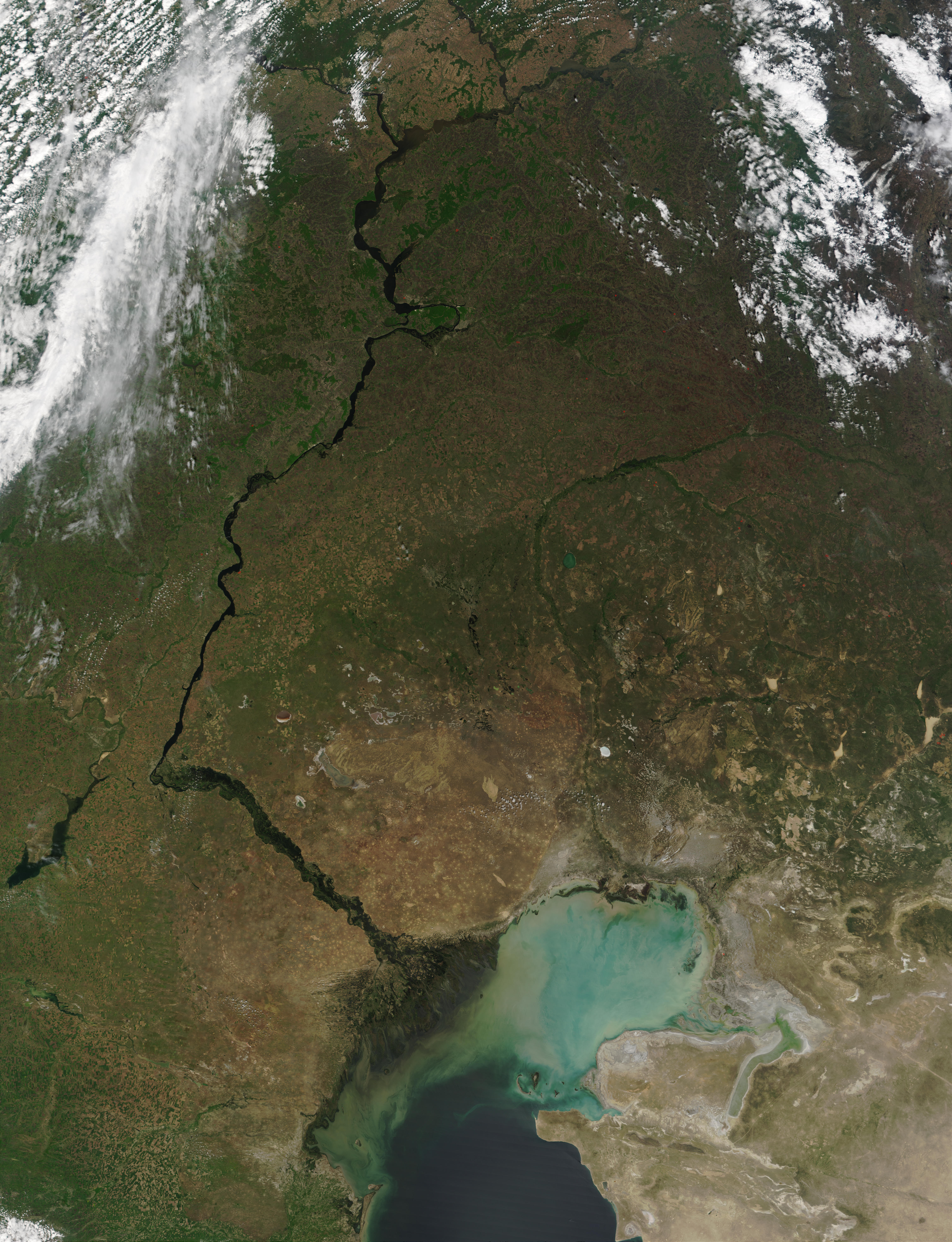
Terra/MODIS, 2002-05-17.

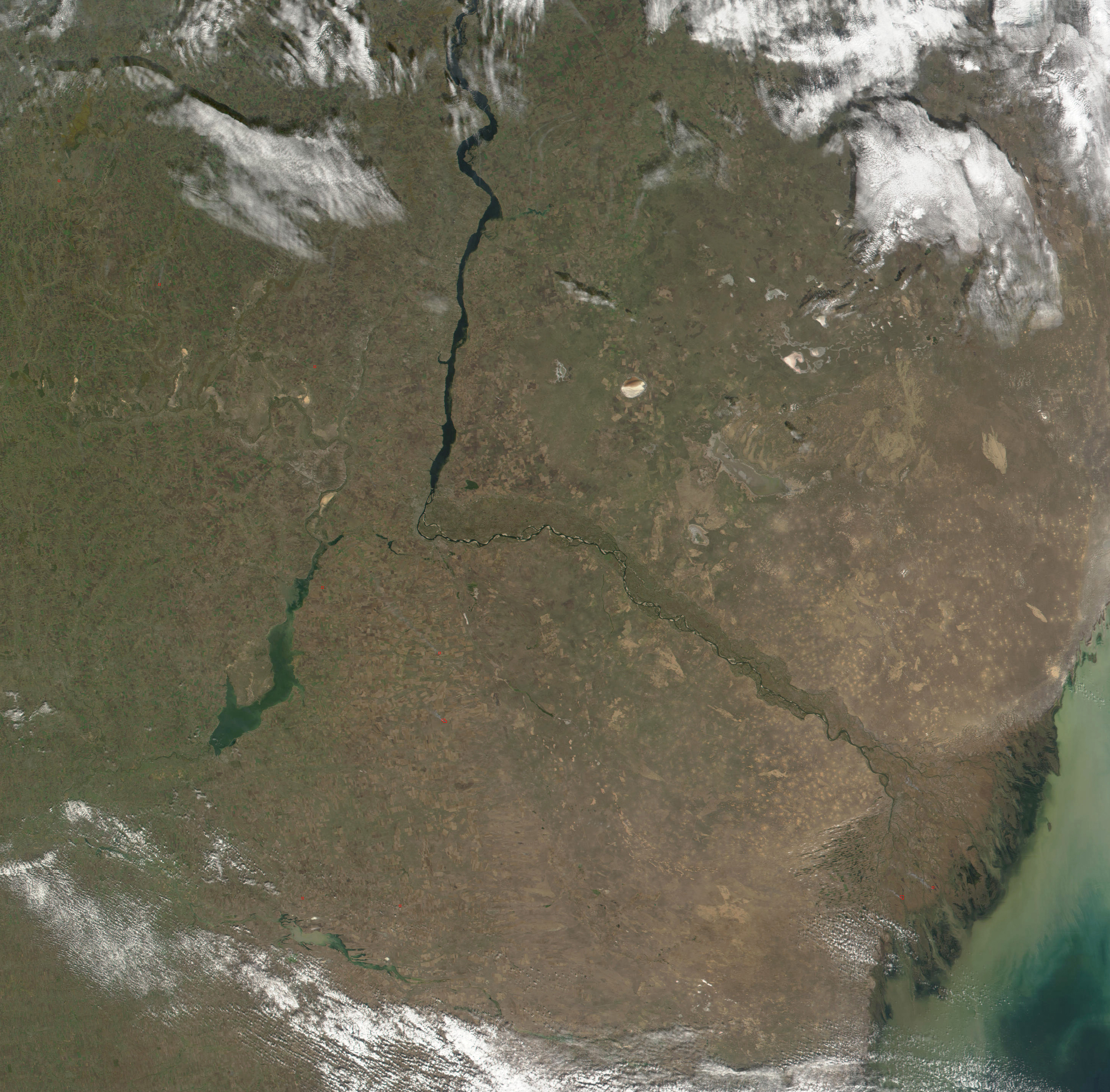
Terra/MODIS, 2001-10-10.

== Cultural significance ==
=== Literature ===
- Without a Dowry, The Storm – dramas by the Russian playwright Aleksandr Ostrovsky
- In the Forests, On the Hills – novels by Pavel Melnikov
- Yegor Bulychov and Others, Dostigayev and Others – plays by Maxim Gorky
- "Distance After Distance" – poem by Aleksandr Tvardovsky
- "On the Volga" – a poem by Nikolay Nekrasov
- "Volga and Vazuza" – a poem by Samuil Marshak
- The Precipice – a novel by Ivan Goncharov
- Volga Se Ganga - a novel by Hindi language writer Rahul Sankrityayan

=== Cinema ===
- Volga-Volga (1938) – a Soviet film comedy directed by Grigori Aleksandrov
- Ekaterina Voronina (1957) – Soviet drama film directed by Isidor Annensky
- The Bridge Is Built (1965) – a Soviet film about the construction of a road bridge across the Volga in Saratov by Oleg Efremov and Gavriil Egiazarov
- A Cruel Romance (1984) – romantic drama directed by Eldar Ryazanov
- Election Day (2007) – Russian comedy film directed by Oleg Fomin

=== Music ===
- "The Song of the Volga Boatmen"

=== Video games ===
- Metro Exodus – Volga is one of main levels of the game

== See also ==
- Caspian Depression
- List of rivers of Russia

== Sources ==
- Harmatta, János (1999). "Herodotus, Historian of the Cimmerians and the Scythians". In Reverdin, Olivier [in French]; Nenci, Giuseppe [in Italian] (eds.). Hérodote et les Peuples Non Grecs [Herodotus and the Non-Greek Peoples] (in French). Vandœuvres, Switzerland: Fondation Hardt pour l'étude de l'Antiquité classique. pp. 115–130. ISBN 978-3-774-92415-4.
