= Kostroma rail bridge =

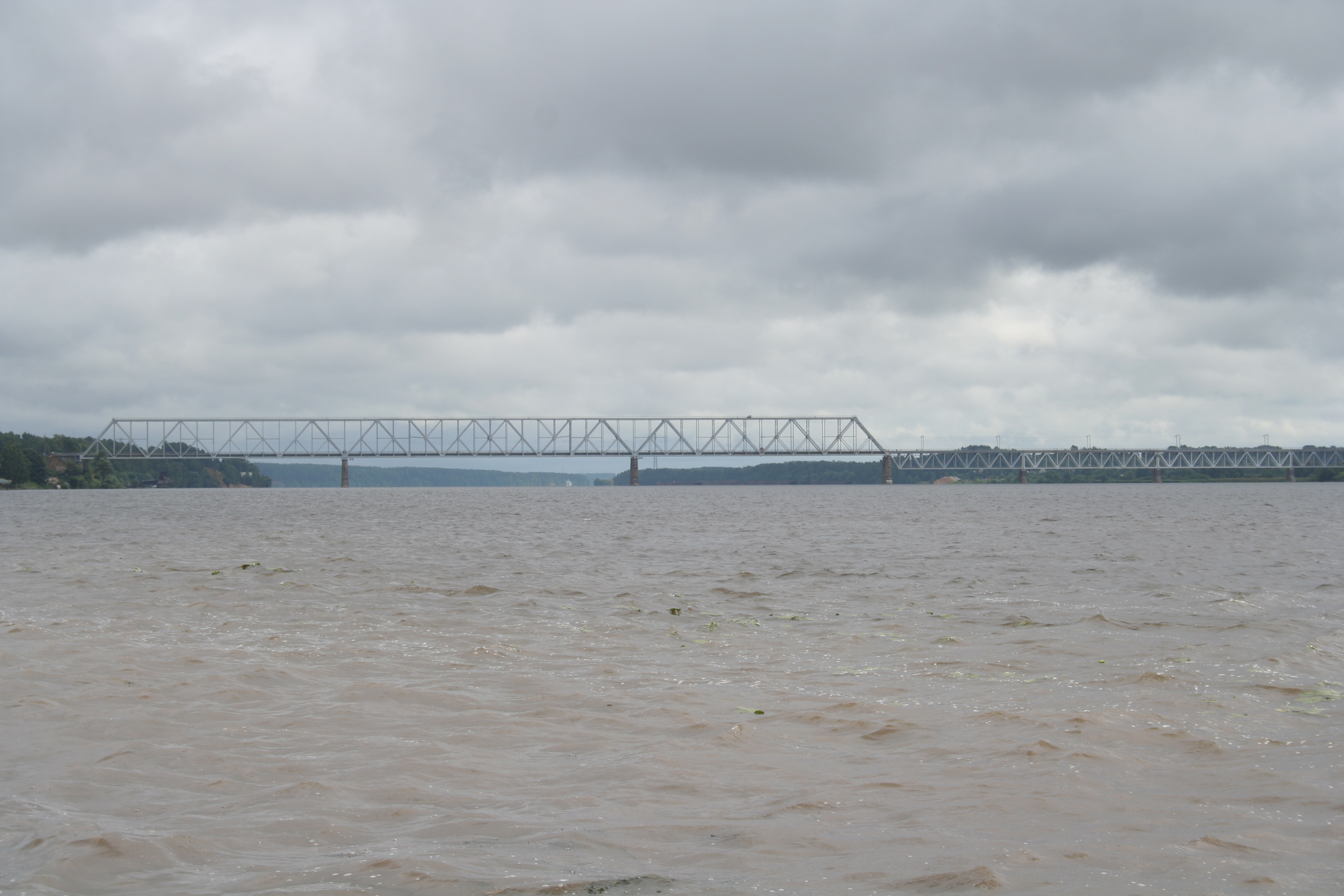
- Coordinates: 55.01°N 82.9180°E
- Crosses: Volga River
- Locale: Kostroma, Russian Federation

Characteristics
- Design: 1-4 spans are equipped with deck-trusses 5-7 spans with through trusses.
- Material: Steel, reinforced concrete, stone.

History
- Opened: 1932

Kostroma rail bridge is a railway bridge across the Volga River in the city of Kostroma, located at the section of Karimovo-Kostroma-Novaya of the Severnaya Railway network. The bridge has 7 spans. 1-4 spans are eqquiped with deck-trusses, while 5-7 spans - with through trusses.

== History ==
In the late 19th century, the requirement for bridge construction in Kostroma arose following the successful implementation of the Nerekhta - Kostroma railway line in 1887. As early as 1907, the residents of the city took the initiative to submit a petition to Tsar Nicholas II, expressing their urgent need for a bridge. Several years later, in December 1927, the Kostroma community once again appealed to the nation's prominent figures, seeking their assistance in the construction of a railway bridge.

The installation of the first caisson took place in the year 1929, and impressively, by 1932, the construction of the bridge had already been successfully finished. The estimated expenditure for this ambitious project amounted to over 8 million rubles, a substantial sum for that time. The construction process involved the dedicated efforts of a staggering 2000 individuals. The remarkable span structures of the bridge were crafted at the renowned Dniepropetrovsk Steelwork Plant, which operated under the Stalmost Trust (now recognized as OJSC "Dnepropetrovsk Steelwork Plant" and named after I.V.Babushkin).

== Boat traffic ==
The bridge is equipped with two navigable spans - the fifth from the right bank (with a width of 147.5 metres (484 ft)) for vessels and rafts going downstream, and the sixth (with a width of 165.7 metres (544 ft)) for vessels going upstream. The height of the navigable spans is 17.5 m from the design level and 15.4 metres (51 ft) from the calculated level.

== See also ==
- Nikolai Belelubsky
- Lavr Proskouriakov
- Northern Railway (Russia)

== Sources ==
- The State Archive of Modern History of Kostroma region (PG 'GANIKO "), p. 3615, op. 3, d.797, l. 1.
- "Severnaya Pravda". March 1, 1932
