= Buzan (river) =

- Native name: Бузан (Russian)

Location
- Country: Astrakhan Oblast, Russia

Physical characteristics
- Source
  - location: Volga
  - coordinates: 46°44′N 47°51′E
- Mouth
  - location: Caspian Sea

The Buzan (Russian: Бузан) is a river in the Astrakhan Oblast of Russia. It is a left distributary which splits from the Volga about 50 kilometres (31 mi) upstream from Astrakhan. From there it flows generally south-east, splitting into several smaller named distributaries near Lebyazhye.

The East Slavic Buzhan tribe inhabited the area of the Buzan river. The Buzhans are one of various Slavic tribes which formed the modern Russian people.

The Volga Delta was subject to territorial disputes between the Nogai Horde and the Russian-annexed Astrakhan Khanate in the 1550s. Negotiations between Ismael Beg and Ivan IV established the Buzan as the boundary between the two realms but proceeded to push the horde back further out of the fertile delta region. The counter-clockwise extremity of the modern Kazakhstan–Russia border reflects this history, largely following the leftmost corridors of the delta.

A 0.7-kilometre (0.43 mi) over-deck truss bridge for the Volga Railway crosses the Buzan at 46°41′0″N 48°4′15″E and was replaced in the mid-2000s to include a vertical lift span and permit river-boats to pass.
