= Buzan, Astrakhan Oblast =

Buzan Бузан
- Settlement
- Location within Astrakhan Oblast Location within Russia
- Coordinates: 46°42′N 47°58′E
- Country: Russia
- Region: Astrakhan Oblast
- District: Krasnoyarsky District
- Time zone: UTC+4:00

Buzan (Russian: Бузан) is a rural locality (a settlement) in Buzansky Selsoviet, Krasnoyarsky District, Astrakhan Oblast, Russia. The population was 1,010 as of 2010. There are 13 streets.

== Geography ==
Buzan is located 46 km northwest of Krasny Yar (the district's administrative centre) by road. Starourusovka is the nearest rural locality.
