= Lebyazhye, Volodarsky District, Astrakhan Oblast =

Lebyazhye Лебяжье
- Selo
- Location within Astrakhan Oblast Location within Russia
- Coordinates: 46°22′N 48°44′E
- Country: Russia
- Region: Astrakhan Oblast
- District: Volodarsky District
- Time zone: UTC+4:00

Lebyazhye (Russian: Лебяжье) is a rural locality (a selo) in Kalininsky Selsoviet of Volodarsky District, Astrakhan Oblast, Russia. The population was 290 as of 2010. There are 2 streets.

== Geography ==
Lebyazhye is located 19 km (12 mi) east of Volodarsky (the district's administrative centre) by road. Baranovka is the nearest rural locality.
