= Buzhan, Nishapur =

Village in Razavi Khorasan province, Iran

Buzhan Persian: بوژان
- Village
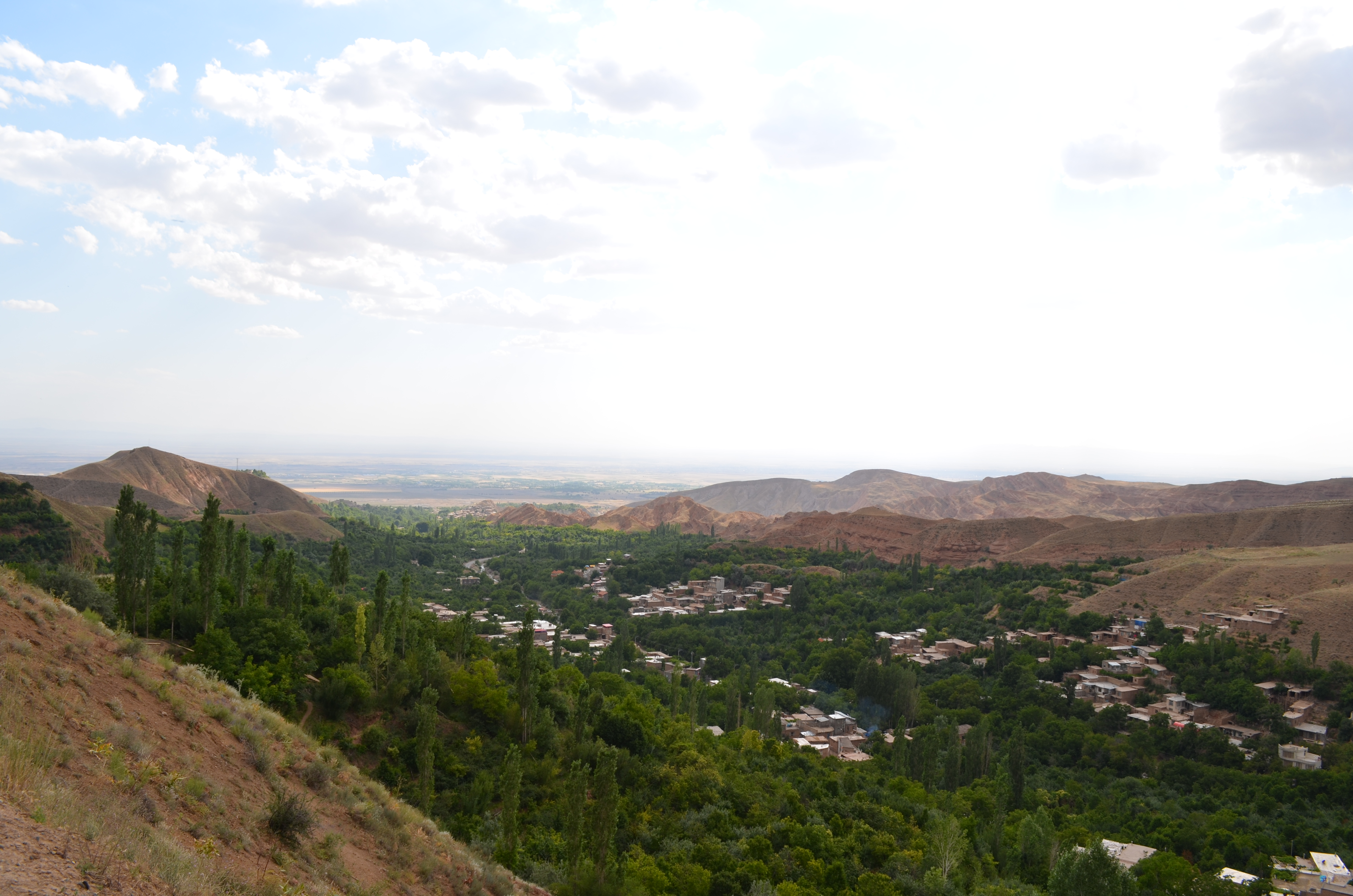
- The village of Buzhan

- Location within Iran
- Coordinates: 36°14′39″N 58°58′15″E
- Country: Iran
- Province: Razavi Khorasan
- County: Nishapur
- District: Central
- Rural District: Fazl

Population (2016)
  - Total: 1,371
- Demonym: Buzhani
- Time zone: UTC+3:30 (IRST)

Buzhan (Persian: بوژان) (Note: Also romanized as Būzhān; also known as Būzān and Mūzer) is a village in Fazl Rural District of the Central District in Nishapur County, Razavi Khorasan province, Iran. On 24 July 1987, a flood in Buzhan killed over 1,000 people and destroyed some other villages.

== Demographics ==
=== Population ===
At the time of the 2006 National Census, the village's population was 756 in 246 households. The following census in 2011 counted 726 people in 265 households. The 2016 census measured the population of the village as 1,371 people in 471 households.
