= Sheep farming in Ukraine =

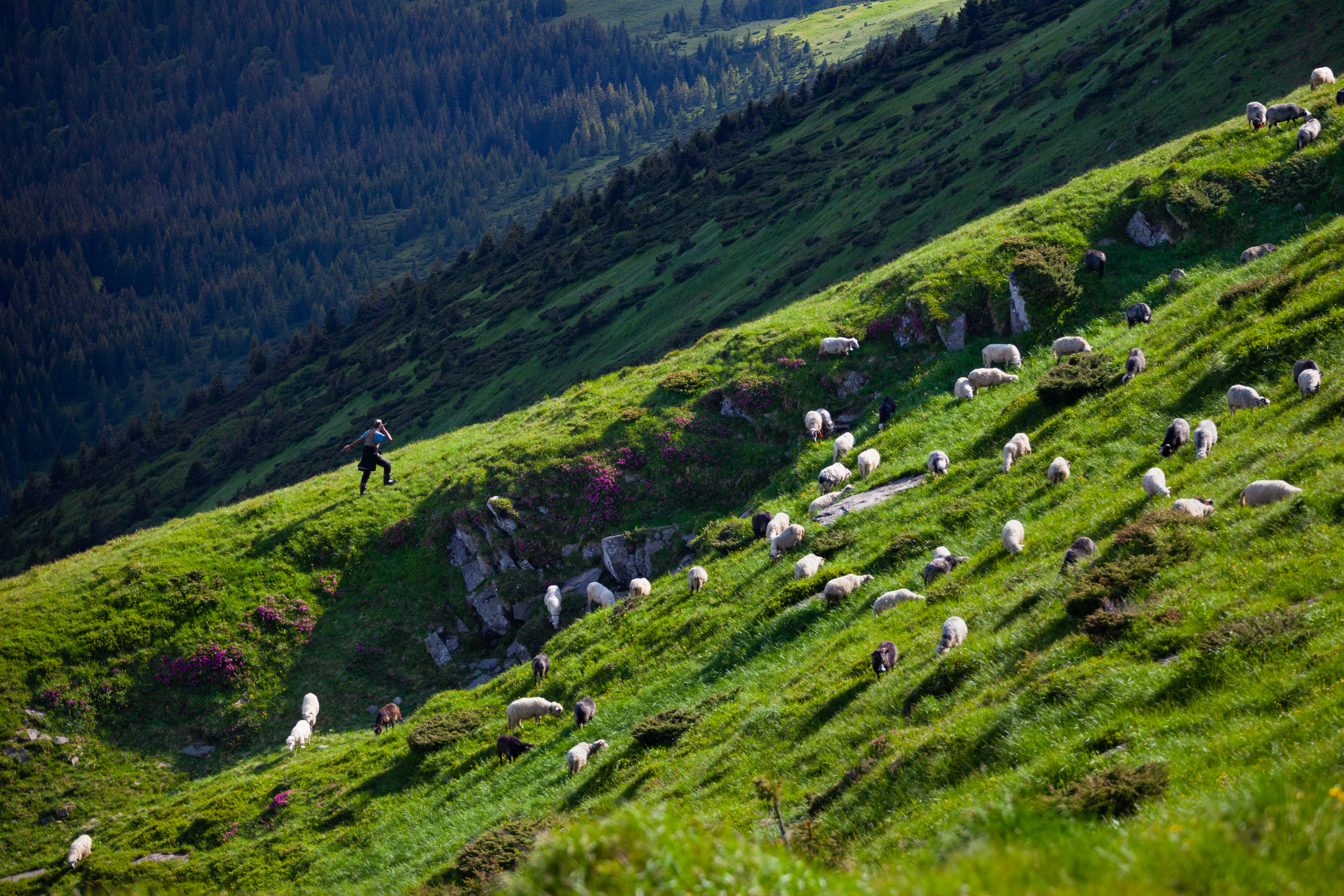
Herding of sheep in the Ukrainian Carpathians

The farming of sheep for meat, wool, and milk in Ukraine has historically played an important role in the rural economies of the southern steppe regions and the Carpathian Mountains in the country.

== History ==
Sheep herding in the territory of modern Ukraine dates back to ancient times and was practiced by pastoralist peoples inhabiting the Pontic–Caspian steppe. Archaeological studies about the Scythian settlements in southern Ukraine have identified sheep among other domesticated animals raised alongside cattle and horses.

Sheep herding was traditionally practiced by the Hutsuls, who inhabited the Carpathian Mountains for centuries. They bred the Ukrainian Carpathian mountain sheep, a coarse-wool breed adapted to the cold mountain climate. The Hutsuls wore horned hats made of black sheepskin during the winters to protect themselves from the cold weather.

During the Russian Empire, sheep herding in Ukraine expanded due to the increasing demand for wool from the textile industry. The state promoted improvements in animal husbandry. New breeds such as the Karakul sheep were introduced. During the Soviet era, the Ukrainian Soviet Socialist Republic was one of the major sheep-raising regions in the Soviet Union. During the period, independent sheep pastures were replaced by kolkhozes and sovkhozes. Ukraine had 6.4 million sheep in 1938, according to a U.S. Central Intelligence Agency analysis of USSR data.

After 1991, the sheep population declined sharply due to the privatization of collective farms. The sheep population declined to about 0.7 million by the early 21st century.

== Sheep breeding in Ukraine ==
Sheep graze on the Pip Ivan in the Ukrainian Carpathians

In modern Ukraine, sheep breeding is practiced on a small scale when compared to the Soviet period. The production of wool is mainly concentrated in southern and western regions such as Odesa and Zakarpattia oblasts. In recent years, sheep farming in Ukraine has shown signs of recovery, with growing interest among private farmers and small enterprises. The state also provides a subsidy of 2,000 hryvnias for each new sheep or goat.

As of 1 January 2019, there are 36 breeding farms in Ukraine where 26.7 thousand heads of sheep are bred, which includes 901 rams and 16.8 thousand ewes. According to the State Statistics Service, In August 2025, Ukraine recorded 981.7 thousand sheep and goats.

In 2026, Ukraine had approximately 760,000 heads, a decrease of 13% over the previous year. Although meat and wool production operate at a loss, the government has nevertheless continued to prioritize increasing exports. As of 2026, 2–2.2 million US dollars worth of live sheep and mutton are exported every year, mostly to the Middle East and North Africa; major trade partners include the United Arab Emirates, Jordan, Libya and Lebanon.

== Products ==
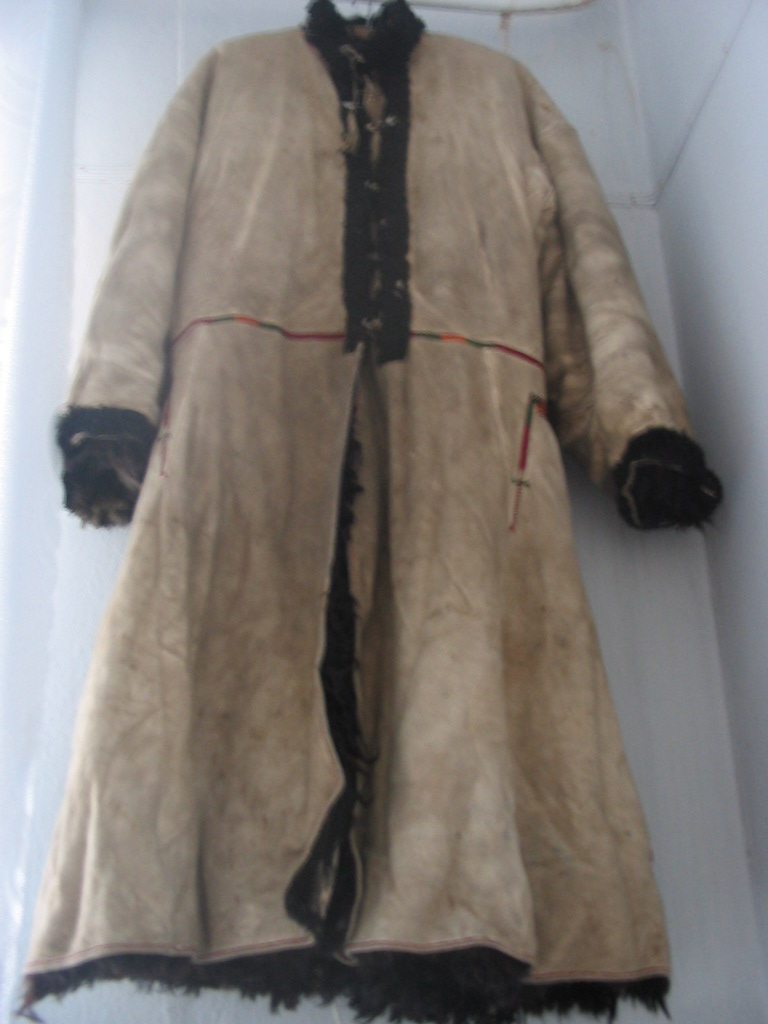
Kozhukh

Sheep farming in Ukraine contributes to the production of products such as wool, meat, and sheep milk. Lamb and mutton are consumed in several regions, especially in the Carpathian Mountains, where pastoralism still exists. Sheepskin is processed into leather and is used to make coats, jackets, fur coats, and other products.

Sheepskin was used to make a traditional Ukrainian fur coat, called kozhukh, which was worn in the winter. Kozhushanka was another traditional coat which was made of sheepskin. It was worn by women during the winter in the middle Dnieper River region Sheep milk is used to produce regional cheeses such as bryndza and vurda, which are an important part of the Hutsul culture.

== Breeds ==
Sheep farming in Ukraine includes a range of native and introduced breeds. The most important native breeds are the Askanian sheep and the Ukrainian Mountain Carpathian sheep.

Other locally developed varieties include the Askanian Karakul sheep. Breeds that were locally developed or introduced have played an important role, especially the Karakul sheep and Merino sheep, which was imported for its fine wool. Imported breeds such as the Romanov sheep and Prekos sheep have also been used for meat and other purposes.

== See also ==
- Agriculture in Ukraine
- Agriculture in the Soviet Union
