= Culture of Ukraine =

The culture of Ukraine is composed of the material and spiritual values of the Ukrainian people that have formed throughout the history of Ukraine. Strong family values and religion, alongside the traditions of Ukrainian embroidery and folk music are integral aspects of the country's culture. It is closely intertwined with ethnic studies about ethnic Ukrainians and Ukrainian historiography which is focused on the history of Kyiv and the region around it.

== History ==
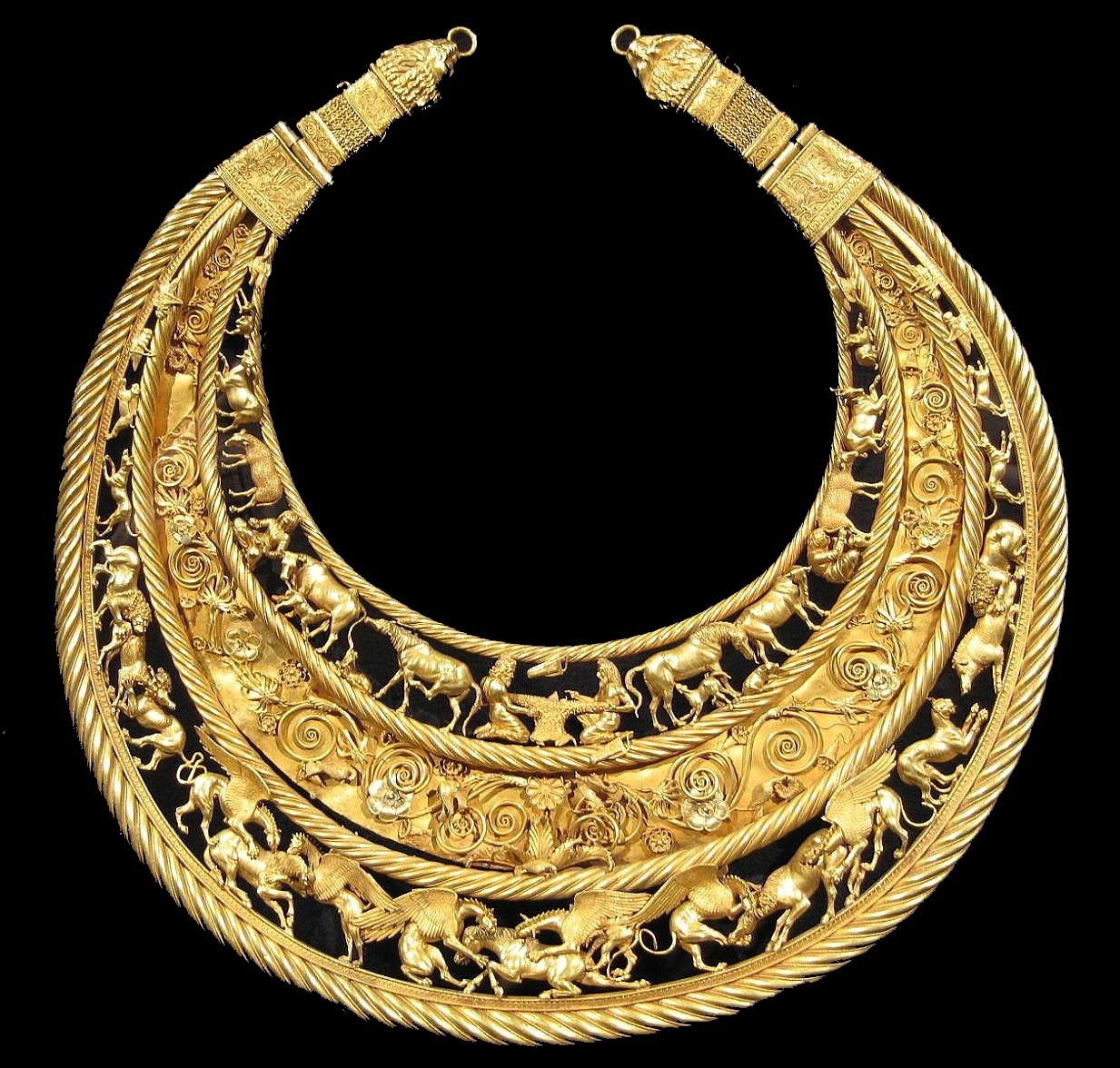
The gold pectoral from Tovsta Mohyla (4th century BCE)

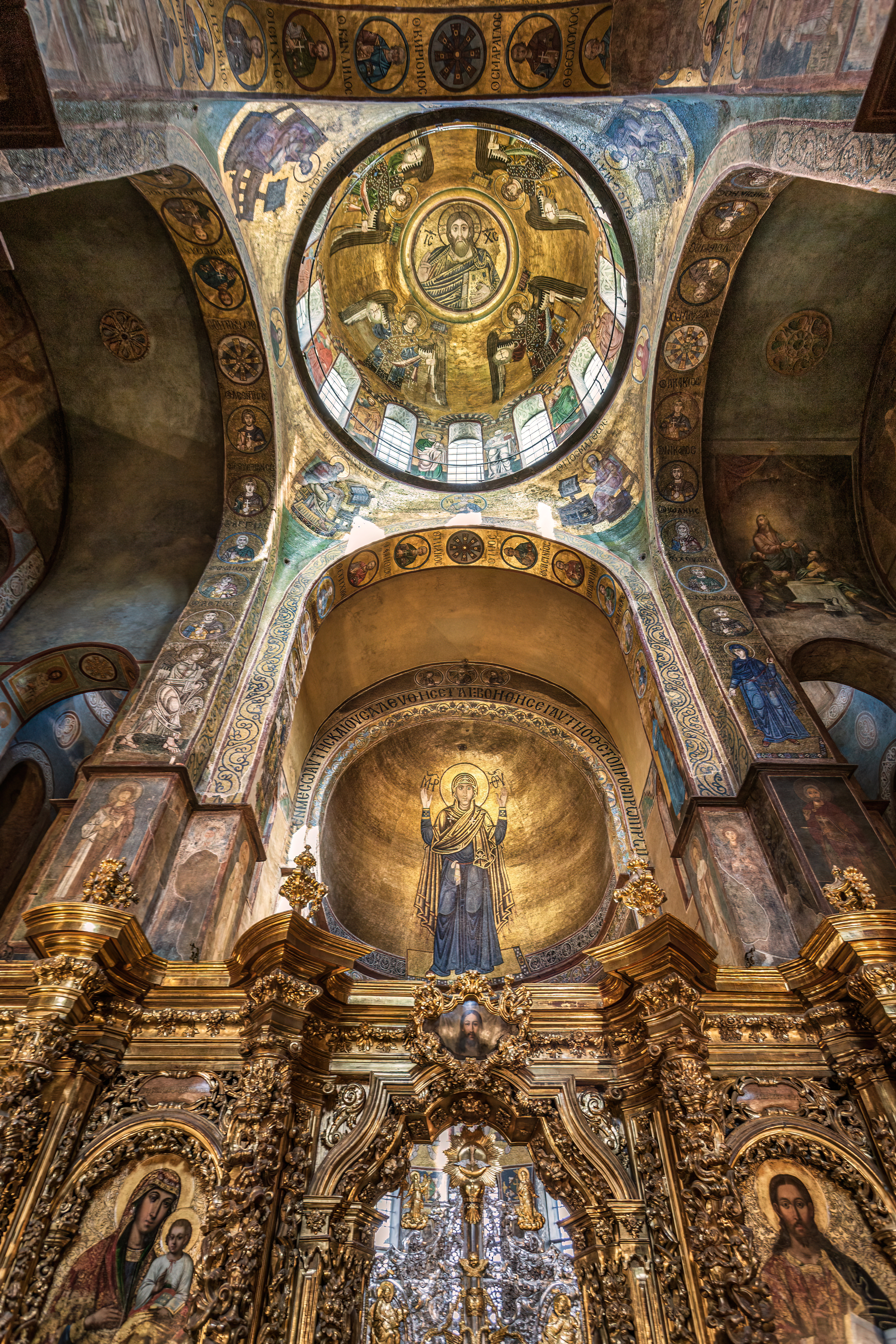
Interior of Saint Sophia Cathedral in Kyiv

Although Ukraine has often struggled to preserve its independence its people have retained their cultural possessions and are proud of their cultural legacy. Ukrainian culture has experienced a notable resurgence since the country gained its independence in 1991.

The earliest evidence of cultural artefacts in region that is now Ukraine can be traced to decorated mammoth tusks in the Neanderthal era. Later, the nomadic tribes of the southern lands of the 4th century BCE, like the Scythians, produced finely worked gold ornaments such as the pectoral found in the Tovsta Mohyla mound.

The modern Ukrainian culture is believed to be formed as a descendant of the ancient state of Kievan Rus' centered in Kyiv as well the Kingdom of Galicia–Volhynia, both of which Ukrainians claim as their historical ancestors. The Ukrainian historian Mykhailo Hrushevsky referred to Ukraine as Ukraine-Rus, emphasising Ukraine's historical claim to the ancient state of Kievan Rus'.

Traditional peasant folk art, embroidery and vernacular architecture are critical to Ukrainian culture, and its elements have often been determined by the resources available at the time. The country's strong tradition of folk art and embroidery continues to this day, with Ukrainian embroidery often considered an art form in itself.

Ukrainian customs are heavily influenced by the Ukrainian Greek Catholicism, Ruthenian Greek Catholicism and Eastern Orthodox Church and traditions from Slavic mythology. Prior to the Soviet Union, the Ukrainian culture has had heavy influence from other East Slavic cultures such as Russian and Belarusian culture.

Ukrainian culture has had to overcome numerous obstacles in order to survive and retain its originality, since foreign powers and empires who dominated the country and its people in the past often implemented policies aimed at assimilating the Ukrainian population into their own population, as well as trying to eradicate and purge elements of the culture. For example, the policy of Russification posed significant obstacles to the development of the culture.

Whilst progressing into modernity, Ukraine remains a highly traditional country, where the observance of certain customs and practices play a central role in its culture. Many significant Ukrainian holidays and events are based on the old Julian Calendar and so differ from their Gregorian counterparts. These include Christmas and New Year's Eve, both of which are highly important in Ukrainian culture.

During the invasion of Ukraine by Russia, damage was caused to 1,945 cultural infrastructure objects, according to Ukraine's Ministry of Culture and Information Policy. Cultural institutions that were damaged or destroyed by Russians include cultural clubs, libraries, museums, galleries, theatres, zoos, and art education institutions. It is estimated that rebuilding the damaged sites may take about 10 years.

== Holidays and celebrations ==
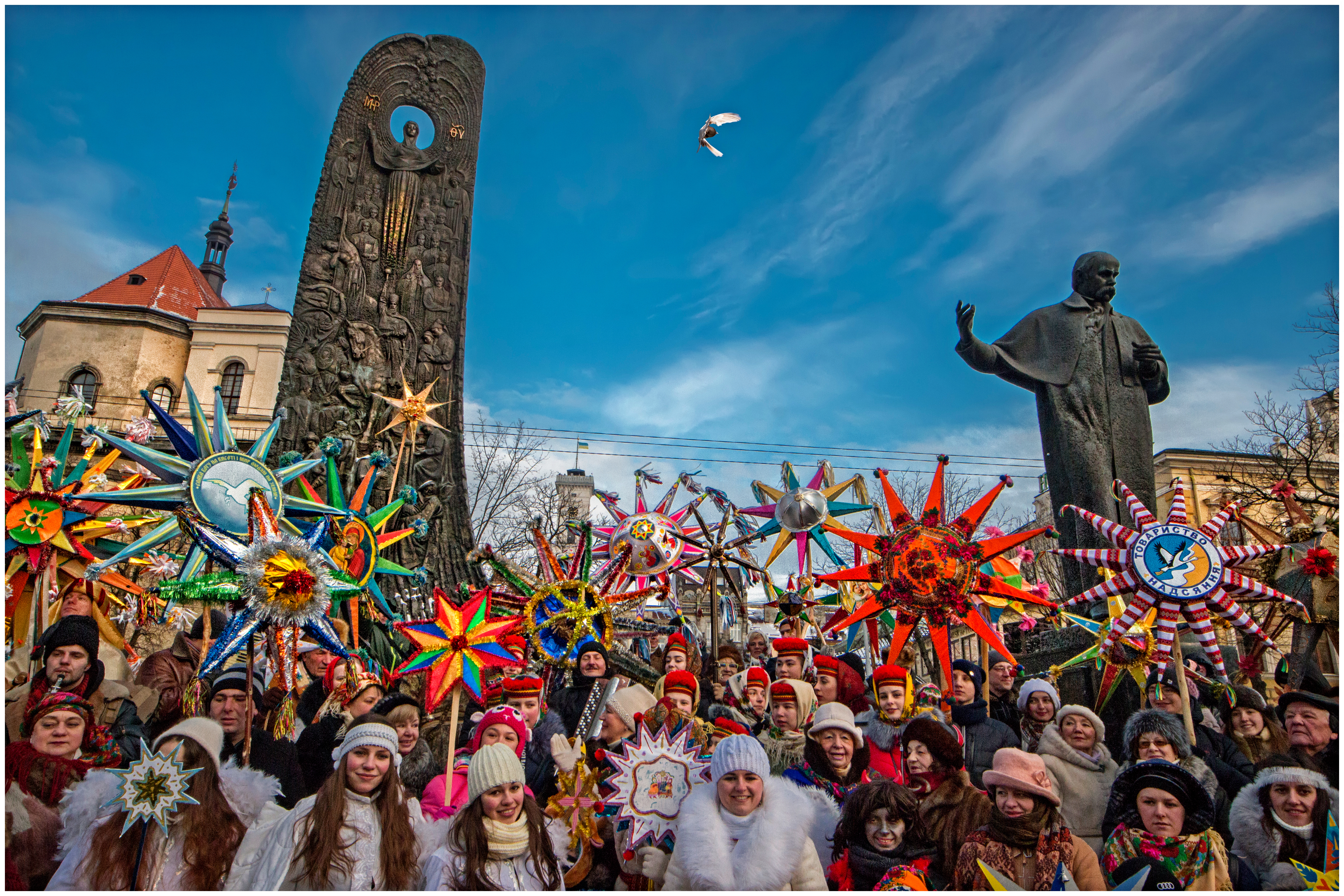
Ukrainians in Lviv celebrate Christmas with traditional Koliada festival "The flash of Christmas star"

Social gatherings like vechornytsi have a long history in Ukrainian culture, and so do traditional holidays like Ivan Kupala Night, Masliana (Masnytsia), Koliaduvannia, and Malanka, where people gather in large groups.

== Religion ==
Religion is practiced throughout the country. Eastern Orthodox Christianity and Eastern Catholicism and Roman Catholicism are the three most widely practiced religions. The Ukrainian Orthodox Church is the largest in the country. Faithful of the Ukrainian Greek Catholic Church, the second largest, practice Byzantine rites, but are in communion with the Roman Catholic Church which means that they are also fully Catholic.

== Arts ==
=== Clothing, fashion, and jewelry ===
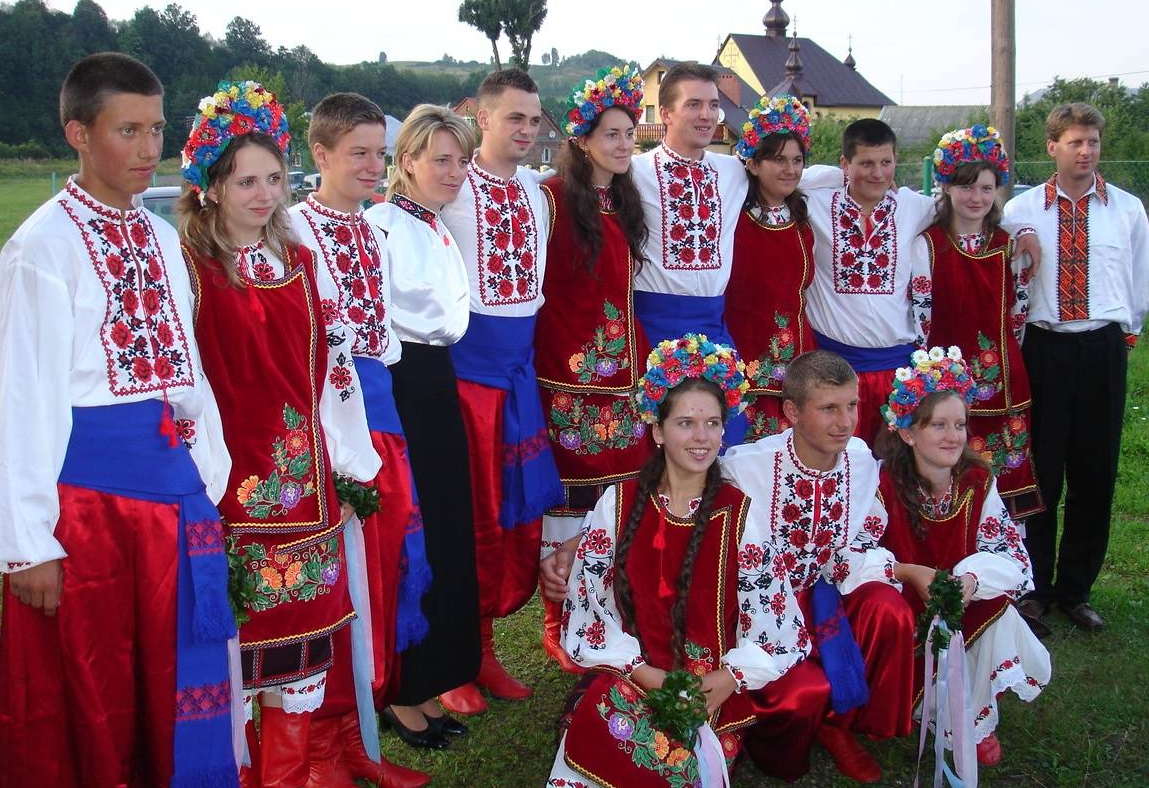
Ukrainians in national dress

The iconic embroidered shirt or blouse, the vyshyvanka, is the most recognizable part of Ukrainian national costume, and even has its own public celebration in May. For men, traditional dress also includes kozhukh, kontusz, żupan and sharovary. For women, traditional dress includes kozhushanka, ochipok for married women, and Ukrainian wreath for unmarried girls. Garments are made using elaborate structural design, complicated weaving techniques, extensive embroidery, and cutwork needlework.

=== Literature ===
Ukrainian literature had a difficult development because, due to constant foreign domination over Ukrainian territories, there was often a significant difference between the spoken and written language. At times the use of the Ukrainian language was even partly prohibited to be printed. However, foreign rule by Lithuania, Poland, Romania, Russia, Austria-Hungary, and the Ottoman Turkey, left behind new words thereby enriching Ukrainian. Despite tsarist and Soviet repression, Ukrainian authors were able to produce a rich literary heritage.

Many Ukrainians also contributed to the closely related literature in Russian language.

=== Visual arts ===
==== Architecture ====
Different regions in Ukraine have their own distinctive style of vernacular architecture, based on local traditions and the knowledge handed down through generations. The Museum of Folk Architecture and Way of Life of Central Naddnipryanshchyna is located in Pereiaslav. The open-air museum contains 13 theme museums, 122 examples of national architecture, and over 30,000 historical cultural objects. The Museum of Decorative Finishes is one of the featured museums that preserves the handiwork of decorative architectural applications in Ukrainian architecture. Decorative finishes use ancient traditional design patterns.

==== Painting, drawing, and sculpture ====
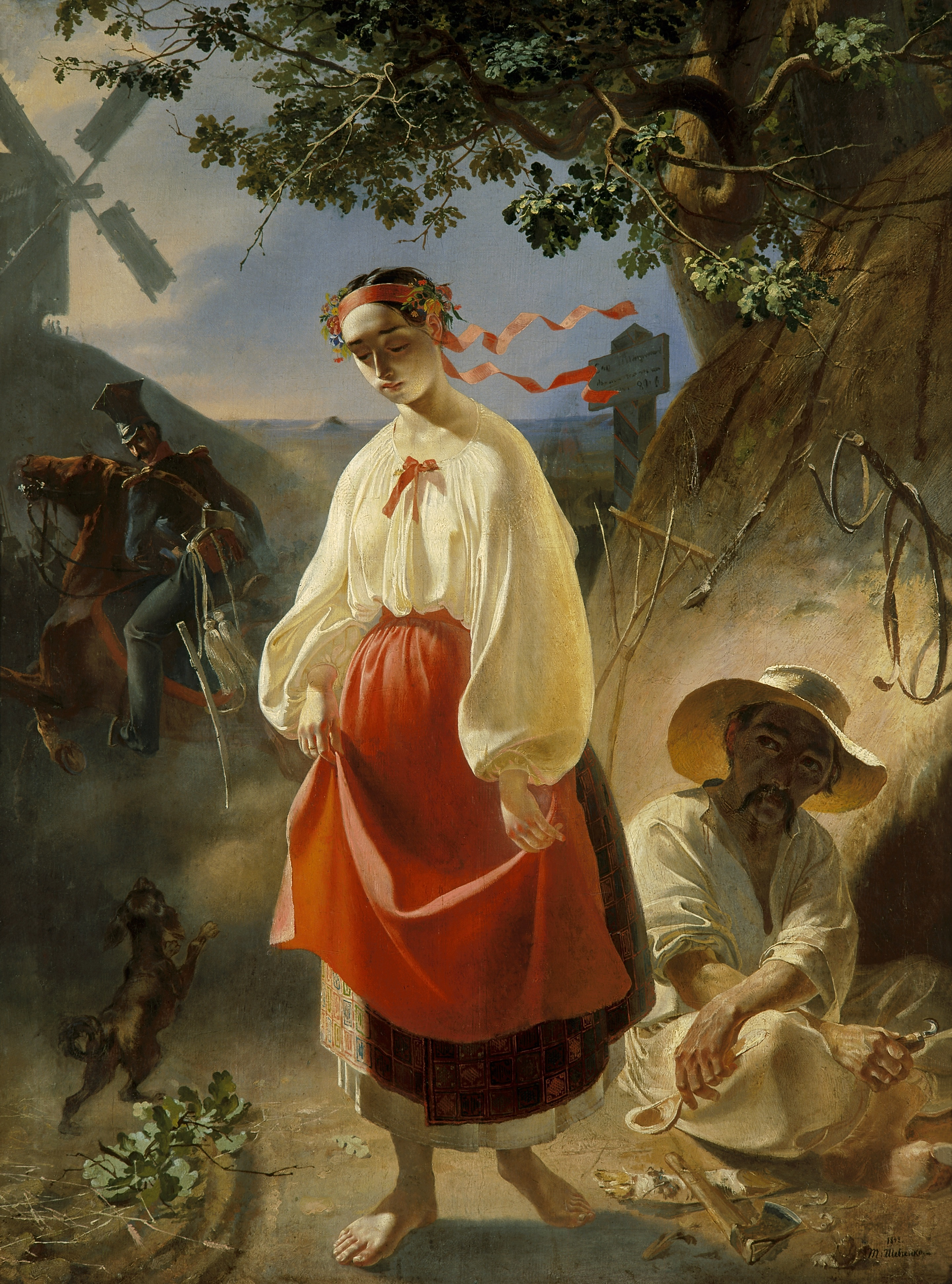
Kateryna (1842), a painting by Taras Shevchenko illustrating his eponymous poem

On special occasions, every aspect of ordinary life is transformed into ornamental art form of artistic expression. Ornamentation and design motifs are steeped in symbolism, religious ritual and meaning. From the illuminated manuscripts of the Peresopnytsia Gospel to the famous pysanky and vytynanky, intricate details have ancient meaning. Much of the oral history was lost during the past 300 years of Russification of Ukraine when Ukrainian culture and language were forbidden. Organizations like the Ivan Honchar Museum, Pysanka Museum and the Ukrainian Museum are dedicated to historic preservation. Different regions of Ukraine have their own traditional ornamentation with their own variation of style and meaning. Examples can be seen in Ukrainian painting (Petrykivka, Kosiv, Opishnia, Bubnivka), ornamental architecture, Ukrainian embroidery, and textile motifs from various Ukrainian historical regions. Some of these works are inscribed in UNESCO and National lists of Intangible Cultural Heritage of Ukraine.

== Sports ==
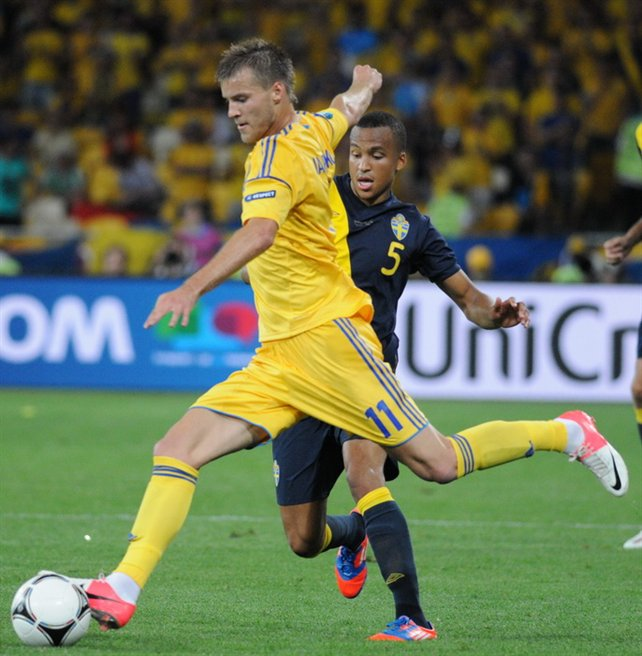
Match of Ukraine national football team in UEFA Euro 2012.

Ukraine greatly benefitted from the Soviet emphasis on physical education, which left Ukraine with hundreds of stadiums, swimming pools, gymnasiums, and many other athletic facilities.

Football is the most popular sport in Ukraine. The top professional league is the Vyscha Liha, also known as the Ukrainian Premier League. The two most successful teams in the Vyscha Liha are rivals FC Dynamo Kyiv and FC Shakhtar Donetsk. Although Shakhtar is the reigning champion of the Vyscha Liha, Dynamo Kyiv has been much more successful historically, winning the UEFA Cup Winners' Cup two times, the UEFA Super Cup once, the USSR Championship a record 13 times, and the Ukrainian Championship a record 12 times; while Shakhtar only won four Ukrainian Championships and one and last UEFA Cup.

Many Ukrainians also played for the USSR national football team, most notably Igor Belanov and Oleg Blokhin, winners of the prestigious Golden Ball Award for the best footballers of the year. This award was only presented to one Ukrainian after the collapse of the Soviet Union, Andriy Shevchenko, the former captain of the Ukraine national football team. The national team made its debut in the 2006 FIFA World Cup, and reached the quarter-finals before losing to eventual champions, Italy.

Ukrainian brothers Vitaliy Klychko and Volodymyr Klychko have held world heavyweight champion titles in boxing.

Ukraine made its debut at the 1994 Winter Olympics. So far, Ukraine has been much more successful in the Summer Olympics (96 medals in four appearances) than in the Winter Olympics (Five medals in four appearances). Ukraine is currently ranked 35th by the number of gold medals won in the All-time Olympic Games medal count, with every country above it, except for Russia, having more appearances.

Other popular sports in Ukraine include handball, tennis, rugby union, basketball, gymnastics, and ice hockey.

== Tourism ==
Ukraine attracts more than 20 million visitors a year from around the world. Seven Natural Wonders of Ukraine and Seven Wonders of Ukraine are popular destinations as well as modern urban cities, festivals, ecotourism, and medical tourism.

== See also ==
- List of UNESCO World Heritage Sites in Ukraine
- Ukrainization
- The Seven Wonders of Ukraine are the seven historical and cultural monuments of Ukraine
- Ukrainian historical regions
- "Slava Ukraini"

== Sources ==
- Dubrovskiy Visnyk. November 2007. "...I ne pereshkoda letu lita"
- Kurkov, Andrey, ed. (2022). Treasures of Ukraine: A Nation's Cultural Heritage. Translated by Jane Bugaeva and Nina Murray. London: Thames and Hudson. ISBN 978-0-500-02603-8.
