= Lambskin =

Lambskin may refer to:

- Lambskin (sheepskin), the skin of a young sheep
- Lambskin condom, made from natural lamb intestines
