= Sheepskin (disambiguation) =

Sheepskin is the hide of a sheep, sometimes also called lambskin or lambswool.

Sheepskin may also refer to:

- Parchment, a thin material made from calfskin, sheepskin or goatskin
  - Diploma, originally made of sheepskin
- Lambskin condom, condoms made from sheep intestines
