= Law leather =

Type of leather used for bookbinding

Law leather was the name for a specific kind and grade of sheepskin leather used for bookbinding. As its name indicates, it was used for binding statute books and other official documents. Many state statutes specified "law leather" bindings. An 1871 Ohio state resolution, for example, provided that

WHEREAS, The first volume of the annual report of the commissioner of railroads and telegraphs, for 1870, now being printed, contains the constitutional provisions, general laws and special charters governing the railroad companies of Ohio, together with much other valuable information worthy of careful preservation; and,

WHEREAS, Six hundred copies of the second volume of said report, containing railroad and telegraph statistics, recommendations of the commissioner, etc., are now provided by law to be bound in cloth, and leather binding is no more expensive, and is much more durable than said cloth binding; therefore,

Resolved by the General Assembly of the State of Ohio, That the supervisor of public printing, be authorized to have the full edition of said first volume bound in good law leather and suitably lettered on the back.

In the 1880s, the Philadelphia publisher Blakiston offered many of its medical texts in a choice of "cloth", "medical sheep", and "law leather" bindings.
