= Ukrainian embroidery =

Traditional embroidery styles of Ukraine

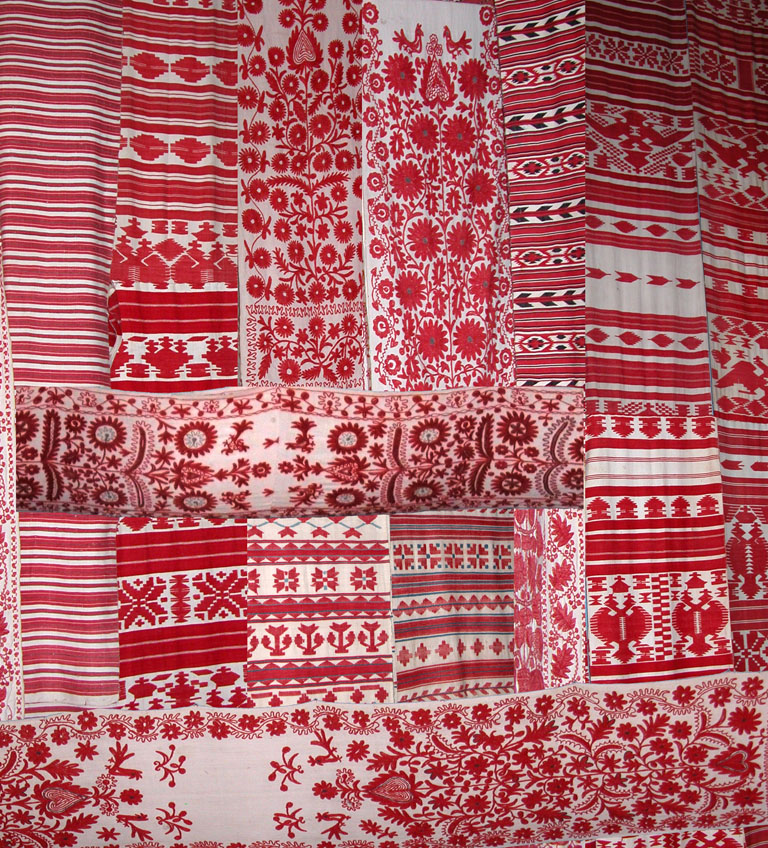
Rushnyks - Ukrainian embroidered ritual cloths. Pereiaslav, Ukraine.

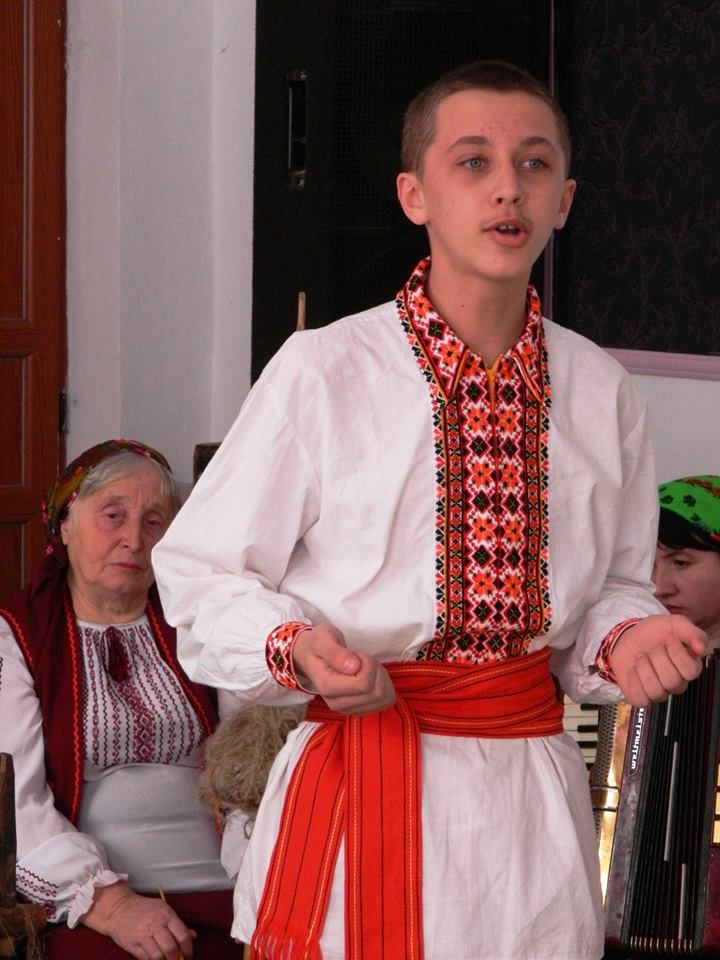
Ukrainians wearing Vyshyvankas

Ukrainian embroidery (Ukrainian: вишивка, romanized: vyshyvka) occupies an important place among the various branches of Ukrainian decorative arts. Embroidery has a rich history in Ukraine, and has long appeared in Ukrainian folk dress as well as played a part in traditional Ukrainian weddings and other celebrations. Appearing all across the country, Ukrainian embroidery varies depending on the region of origin. From Poltava, Kyiv, and Chernihiv in the east, to Volyn and Polissia in the northwest, to Bukovina, and the Hutsul area in the southwest, the designs have a long history which defines its ornamental motifs and compositions, as well as its favorite choice of colors and types of stitches.

== History ==
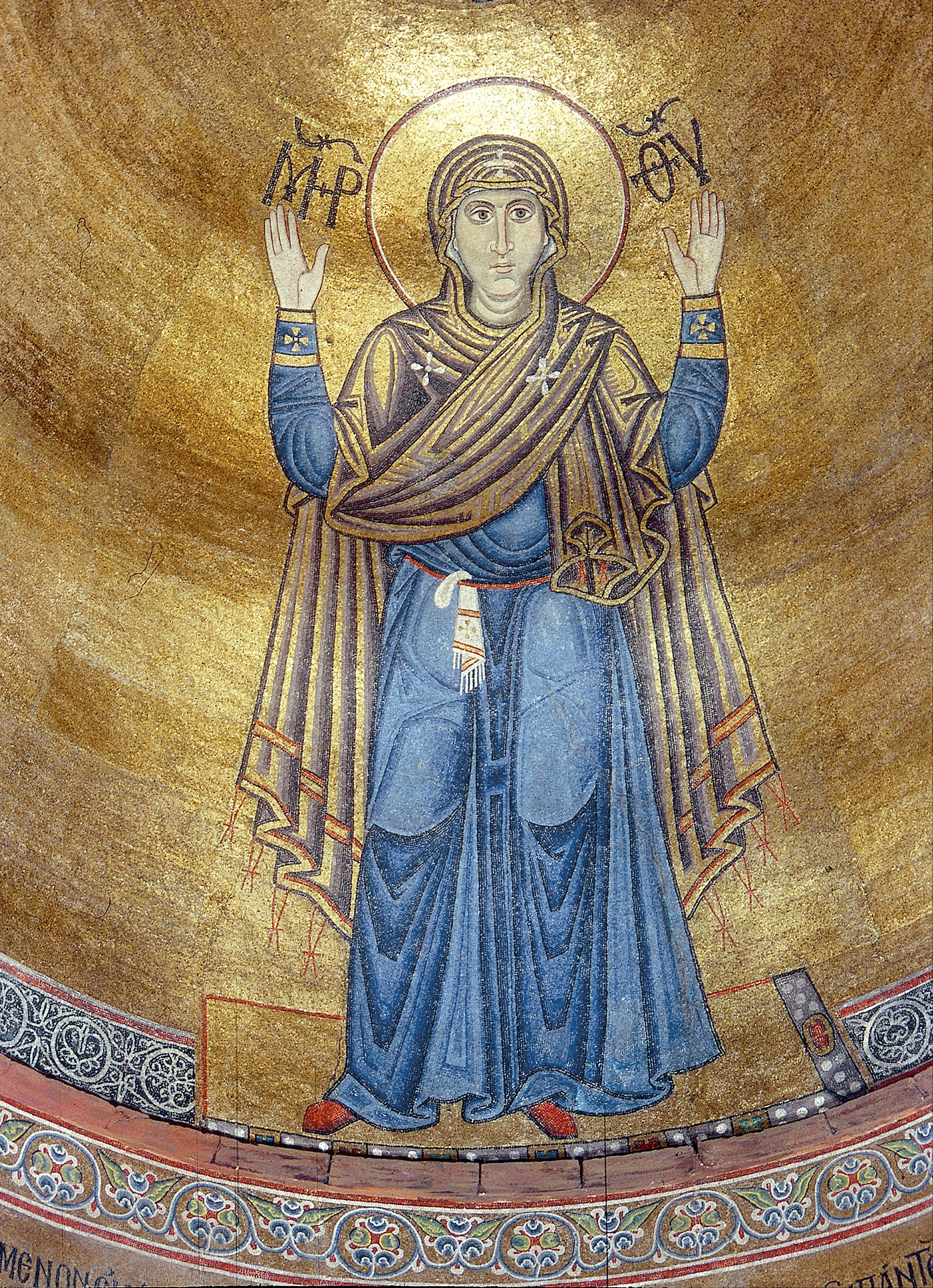
12th century icon of Virgin Orans in the Saint Sophia Cathedral in Kyiv. Notice the embroidered handkerchief on the belt.

Embroidery is an ancient and symbolic tradition in Ukraine. In 513 BC, Herodotus, in describing the invasion of Darius, mentioned that the Thracian-Dacian people who lived in what is now the Balkans and western Ukraine used embroidery to decorate their clothes. Excavations of cities from the 1st century AD have revealed examples of embroidered clothing in the territory of Ukraine. Other early examples of embroideries include pre-Christian goddess motifs, such as Berehynia. There are eleventh-century examples of embroidery in the Saint Sophia Cathedral in Kyiv on frescos and miniatures. Many of these early examples have distinct similarities to the local embroidery throughout history. Ukrainian embroidery was an everyday art in the common people's lives until the 19th century, when it became more of a craft.

Embroidery was mostly used for the decoration of clothing and fabrics and for the decoration of homes and churches. Embroidered products, especially a rushnyk, are greatly symbolic for a series of ceremonies and rituals of Ukraine.

Most embroidery was used for clothing. The primary object of clothing that was decorated with embroidery was the shirt, called a vyshyvanka. The shirt was mostly decorated with embroidery on the sleeves, and also on the neck, bosom, and the cuffs. Other elements of clothing are also embroidered, including scarves, skirts, aprons, men's caps and trousers, sleeveless jackets, kozhukh and kozhushanka (sheepskin coats), sashes, ochipok, etc. In some areas, bed linens were also embroidered. Aside from clothing, other items decorated with embroidery are towels, tablecloths, bench covers, veils and kerchiefs, and pillowcases. Many of these items are used to decorate the interior of churches, for example a cover for the sacraments or a shroud for icons.

According to Ukrainian-Canadian activist Mary Doliszny, the Soviet Union's attempts at Russification took a toll on the embroidery of Ukrainians. Because of attempts to destroy the art of Ukrainian embroidery, diaspora Ukrainians worked to document patterns and revive the art. Much of this research was done at the institutes of Ukrainian studies at Harvard University and the University of Toronto.

Folk embroidery was symbolic and connected with a great number of beliefs, myths, and superstitions, including beliefs regarding protection and fertility. The lozenge shape is a common motif and represents a sown field and female fertility.

In Ukraine, embroidery was developed by women and typically remains a women's activity to this day. There was scarcely a woman who did not master it to some extent. It is popular in both Ukraine and her diaspora, where many embroidery clubs exist.

Embroidery is remembered as a national pastime and is a part of the Ukrainian cultural and national identity.

== Variations ==
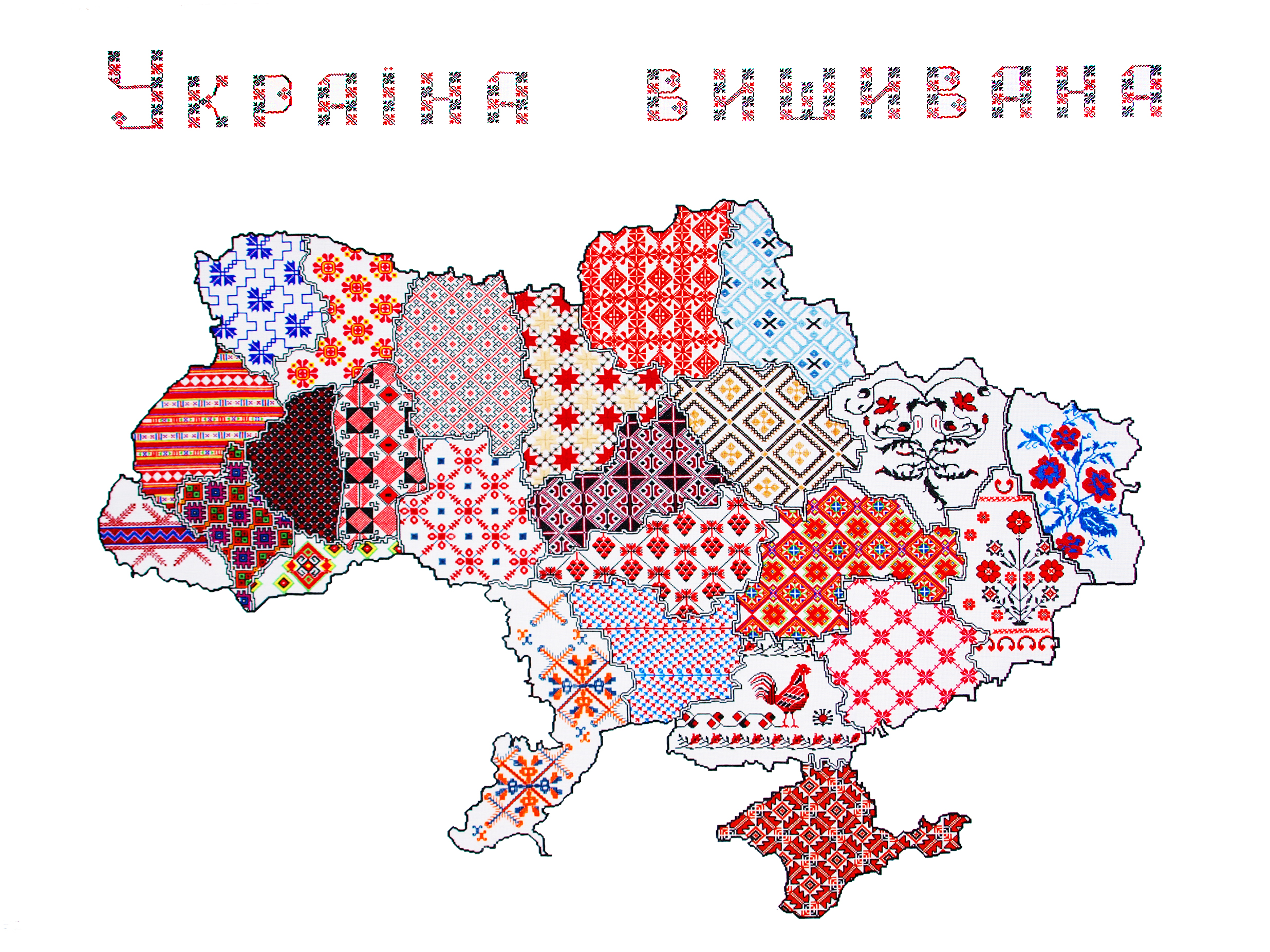
Dissemination pattern

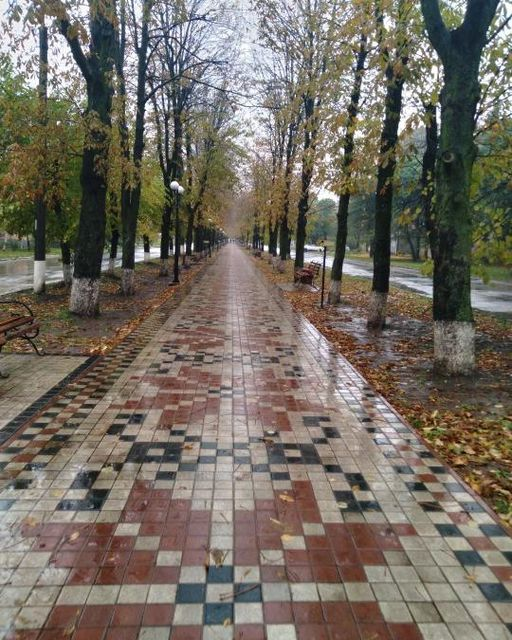
Alley in the city of Znamianka

Ukrainian embroidery has many variations from region to region, or even village to village. However, most embroidery is generally similar overall for most Ukrainians. Even with these variation, the styles of needlework found throughout Ukraine, when taken together, represent a definite Ukrainian national style of embroidery. Red and black were the most common colors of Ukrainian embroidery. Ukrainian folk embroidery is notable for great variety of its techniques.

=== Central and Eastern Ukraine ===
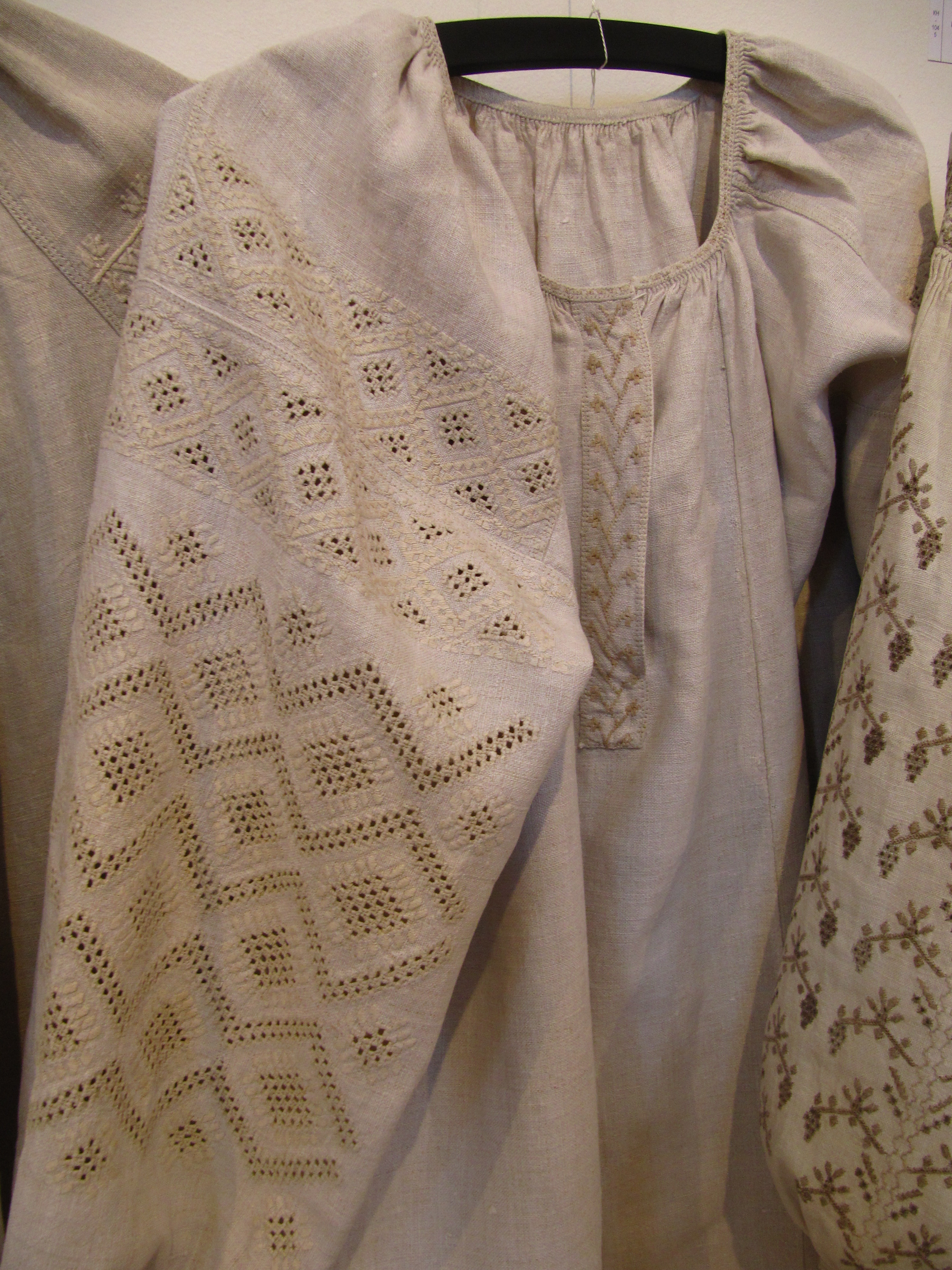
White-on-white openwork embroidery of Poltava Region

In the Central and Eastern parts of Ukraine, embroidery usually consists of geometric forms and plant ornaments. The color range of the motifs is very delicate and very diverse as to individual details. In the Poltava Region, the colors usually include pale blue, white, light ochre, pale green and gray tones. Poltava and Reshetylivka products are especially famed for their “white-on-white” and openwork embroidery. The red, red-blue, or red-black color scheme plays an important role in Central and Eastern Ukrainian embroidery, as it did throughout almost the whole of Ukraine.

=== Western Ukraine ===
Girl from Podillya ca. 1800 by Vasily Tropinin

In Western Ukraine, especially the Hutsul region, embroidery uses geometric ornament and a sharply contrasting palette. Besides the now widely used cross-stitch, there is still the ornamental needle-weaving stitch called “nyzynka”, which is executed predominantly on the reverse of the fabric and resembles tweed. This is one of the most archaic traditional Ukrainian stitches that, in combination with the predetermined areas of white background material that peek through the densely-laid threads, emphasizes the clear-cut silhouette of the main patterns.

In the Lemko region, the oldest embroideries were executed in red and red-blue linear motifs. Over time, other colors, such as blue, green and yellow, were added.

In the Boiko region, embroideries varied from simple red-blue geometric motifs in the western reaches of their territory, to wide, densely worked geometric and/or floral patterns in the eastern and southern reaches. Boikos were also well known for their finely embroidered pleated smocking work called “bryzhky”, which were found mainly around the collars and sleeve cuffs of women’s and men’s shirts, but also along the top hems of women’s aprons.

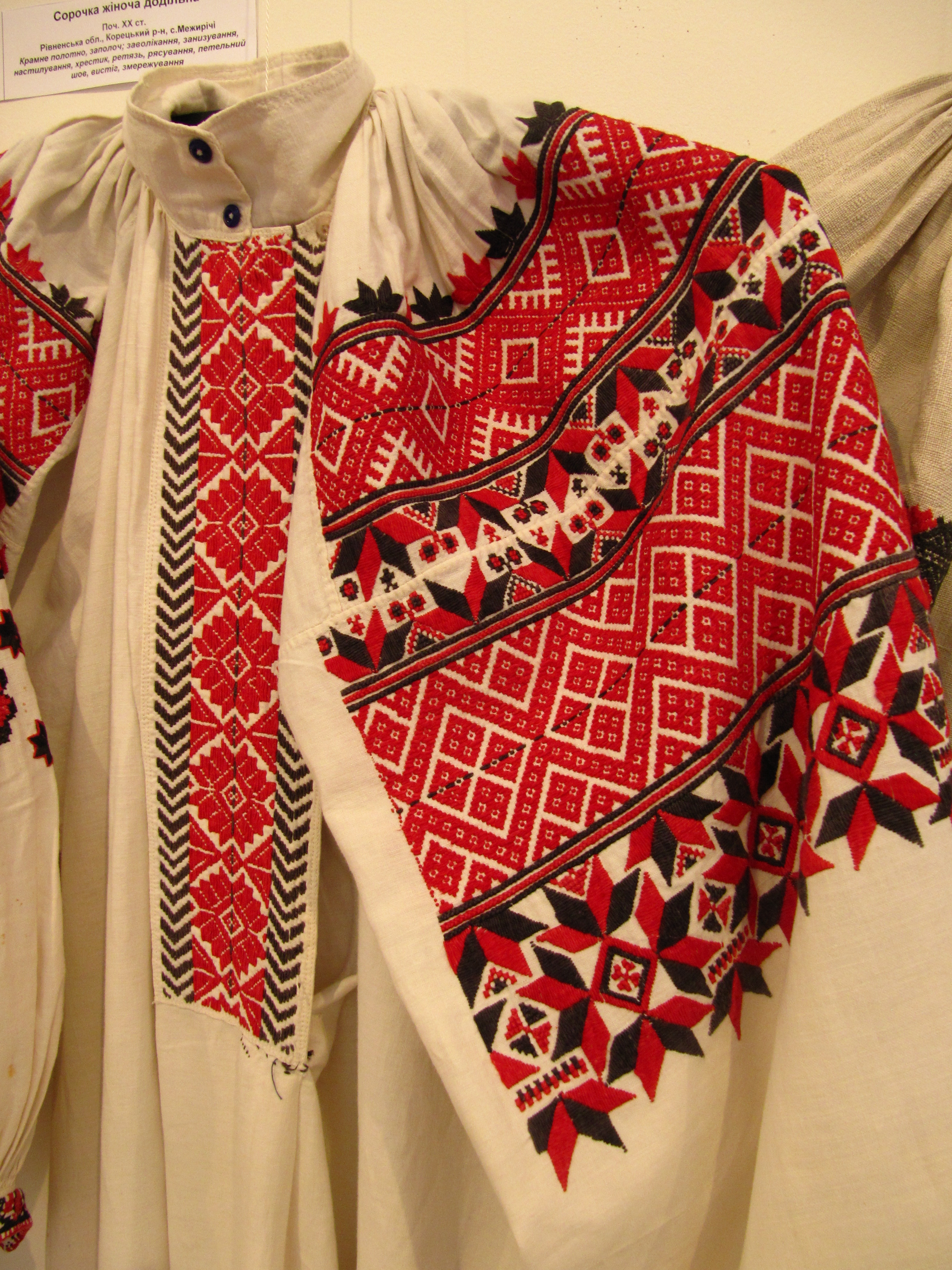
Women's embroidered shirt. Beginning of 20th century, Rivnenska Oblast. Exhibited at the Ivan Honchar Museum

The embroideries of Bukovina are among the richest in all of Ukraine, often combining as many as nine or more colors, including silver and gold metallic thread as well as colored glass beads. It also uses a number of stitches.

The needlework of Pokuttia is also rich and intricately executed, and also quite varied. Red is the predominant color in many of the styles of embroidery in this region, usually being worked in thick home-processed wool threads, sometimes with accents of yellow, green and blue added. Although cross-stitch is not uncommon, the older and more traditional technique is that of the so-called “curly stitch”. In some parts of Pokuttia and neighboring Podillia, wide motifs of intricately worked white-on-white embroidery combined with open work were popular. The embroideries of Podillia are similar in many respects to that of both Bukovina and Pokuttia, with discreet yet recognizable differences in color scheme, motifs and placement that nonetheless set them apart.

In Halychyna, there is a variety of embroidery styles that were specific for individual localities, such that when one sees a piece of embroidery there is no mistaking its origin.

Volhynian clothing was mainly embroidered with red or black threads; the predominant motifs of the region are geometric plant ornaments.

=== Northern Ukraine ===
In the northwest and north of Ukraine (including the Ukrainian ethno-historic territory of Poland), needlework traditions have been preserved relatively intact from the oldest of times. Red, red-blue and red-black were the predominant color schemes in the archaic geometric embroideries, executed primarily in dense rows of a horizontal needle-weaving stitch (called “zavolikannia”) that created horizontal bands of patterns reminiscent of weaving. Floral motifs are also popular in the north, using red, red-blue or red-black palettes as the needle-woven bands, but in the much more recent technique of cross-stitch.

== Preservation ==
As of November 2023, six items involving embroidery are inscribed in the National Inventory of Elements of the Intangible Cultural Heritage of Ukraine: Krolevets handloom weaving, white-on-white embroidery of Reshetylivka, Örnek, Borshchiv folk embroidery, Klembivka embroided shirt "with a flower", and embroidery of women's shirts in Hadiach region.

== Notable people ==
- Hanna Veres

== Gallery ==
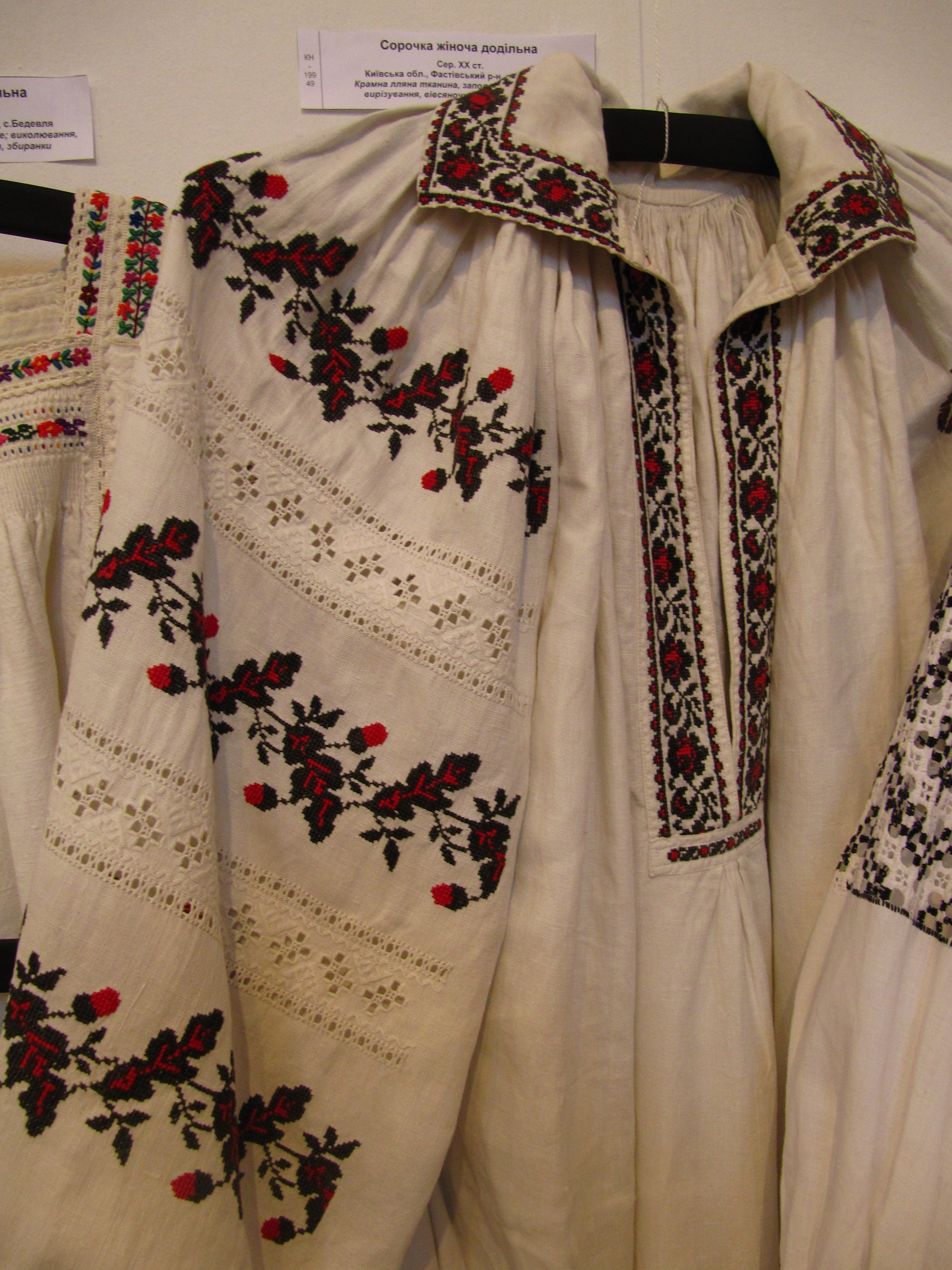
20th century embroidered shirt, Kyiv Oblast. Exhibited at Ivan Honchar Museum

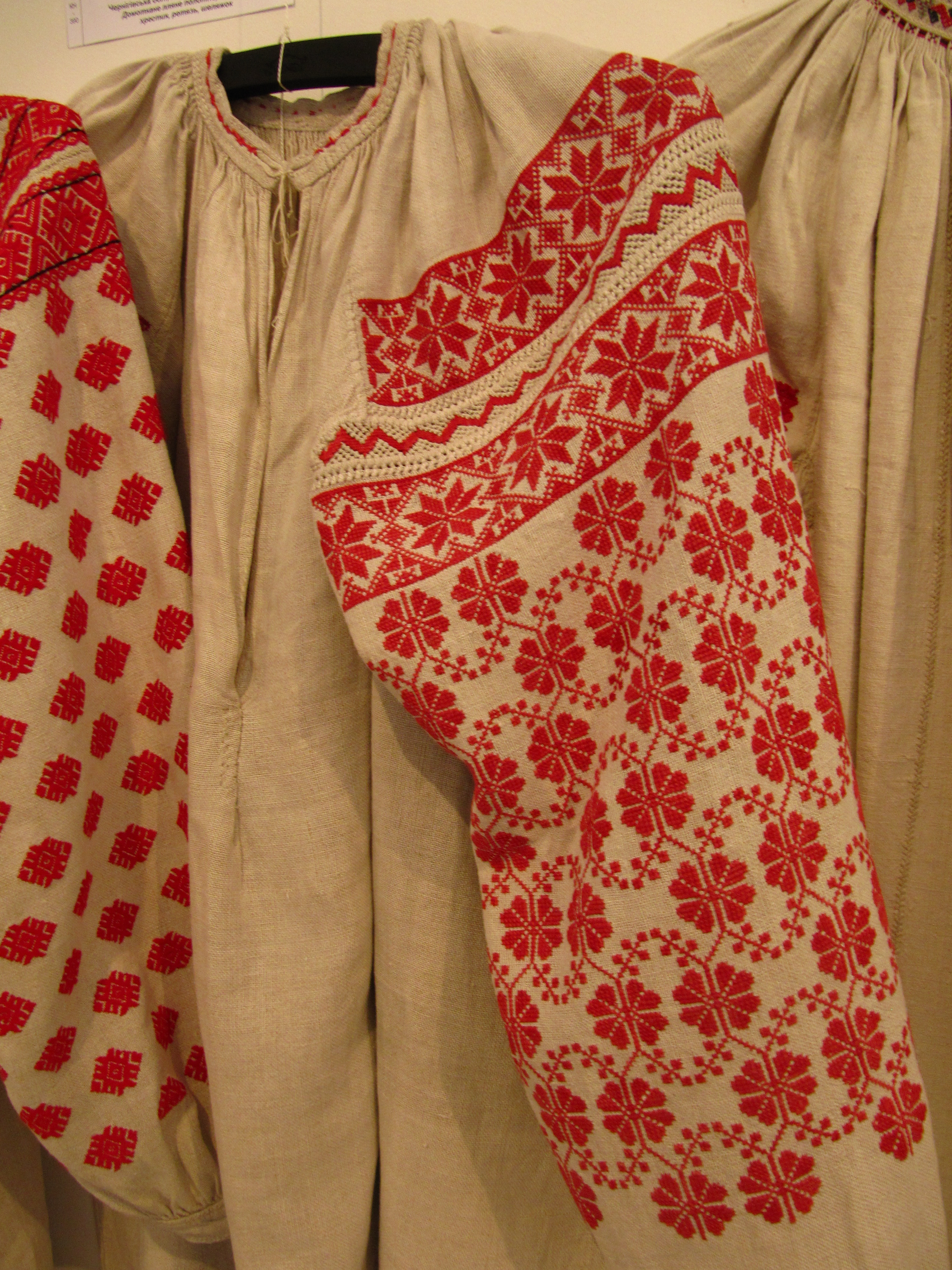
19th century embroidered shirt, Chernihiv Oblast. Exhibited at Ivan Honchar Museum

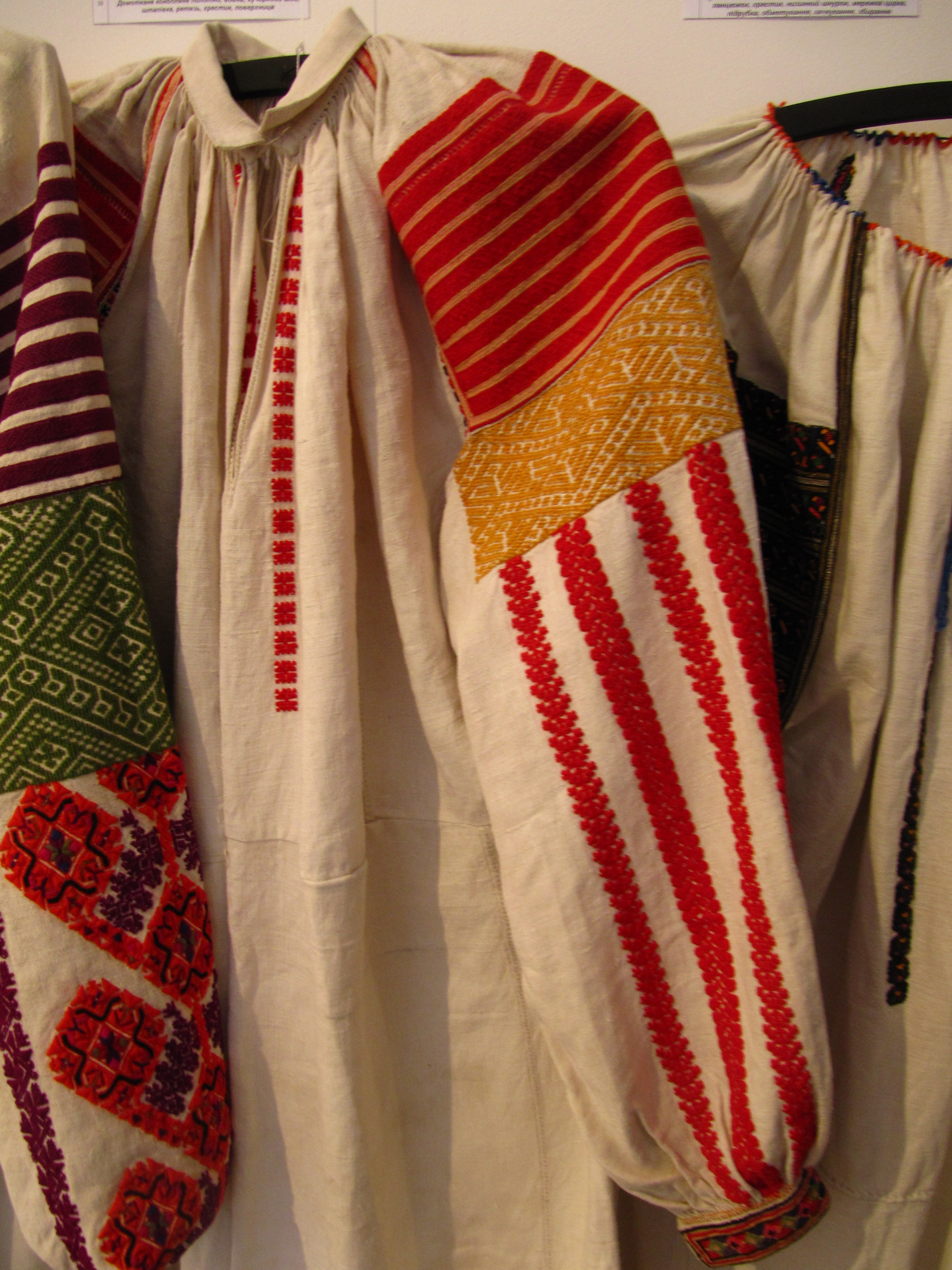
20th century, Ivano-Frankivsk Oblast. Exhibited at Ivan Honchar Museum

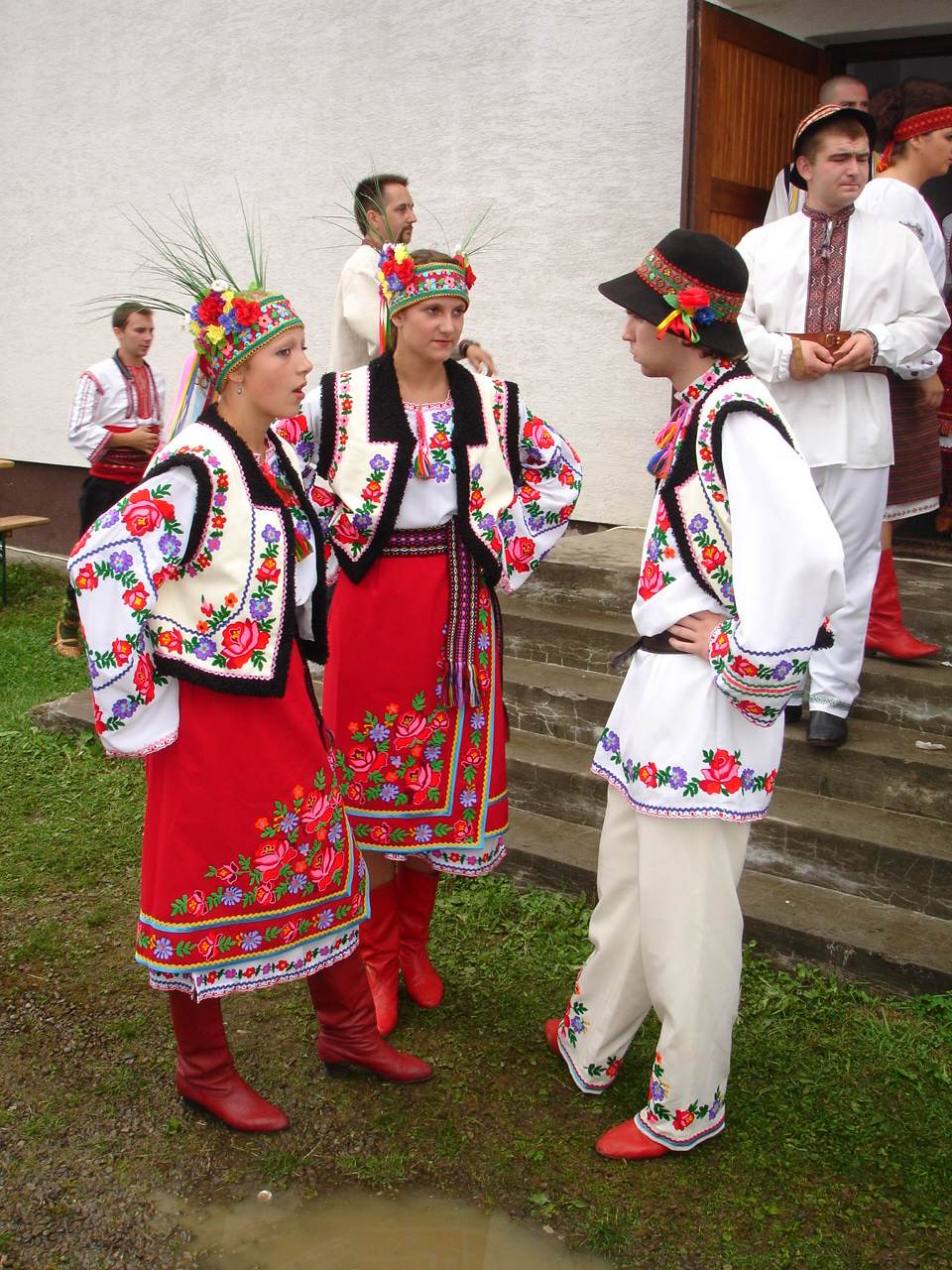
Carpatho-Rusyn traditional costumes

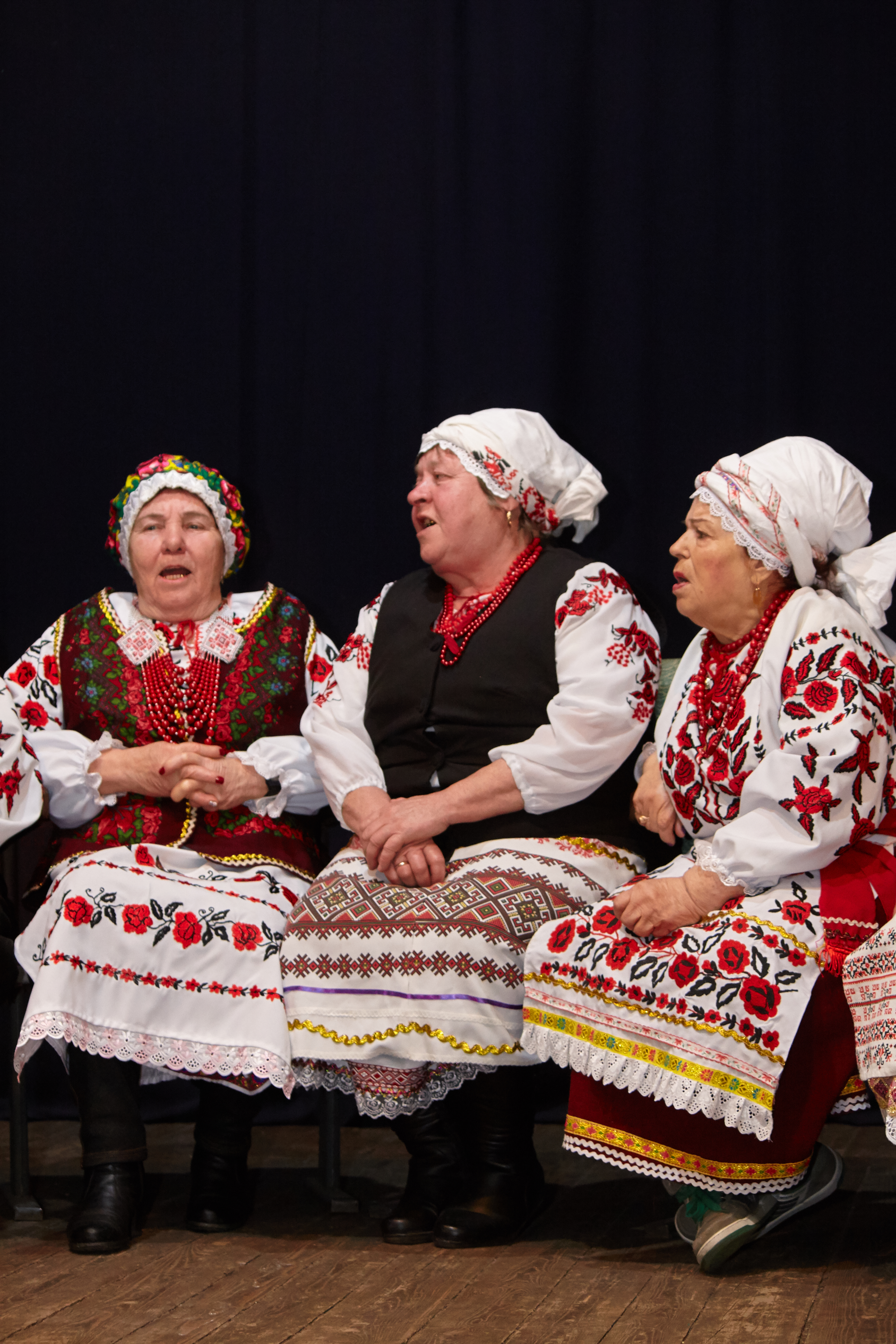

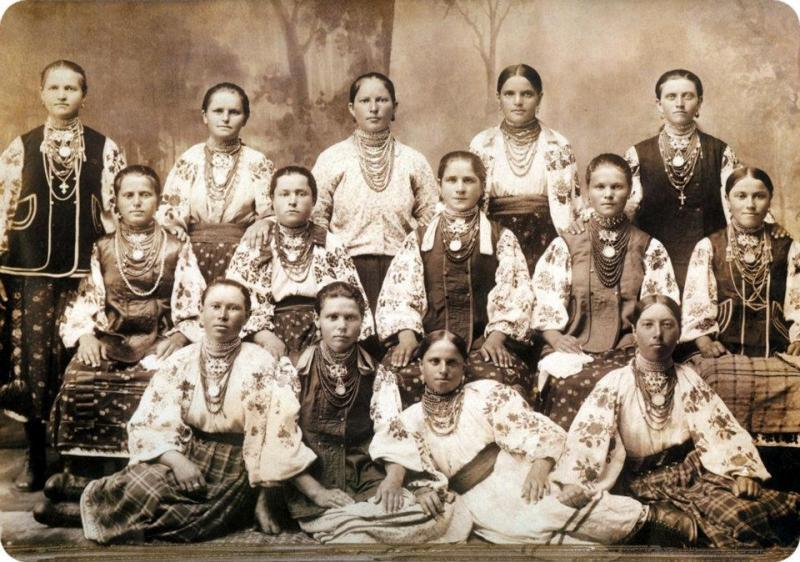
Cherkasy Oblast

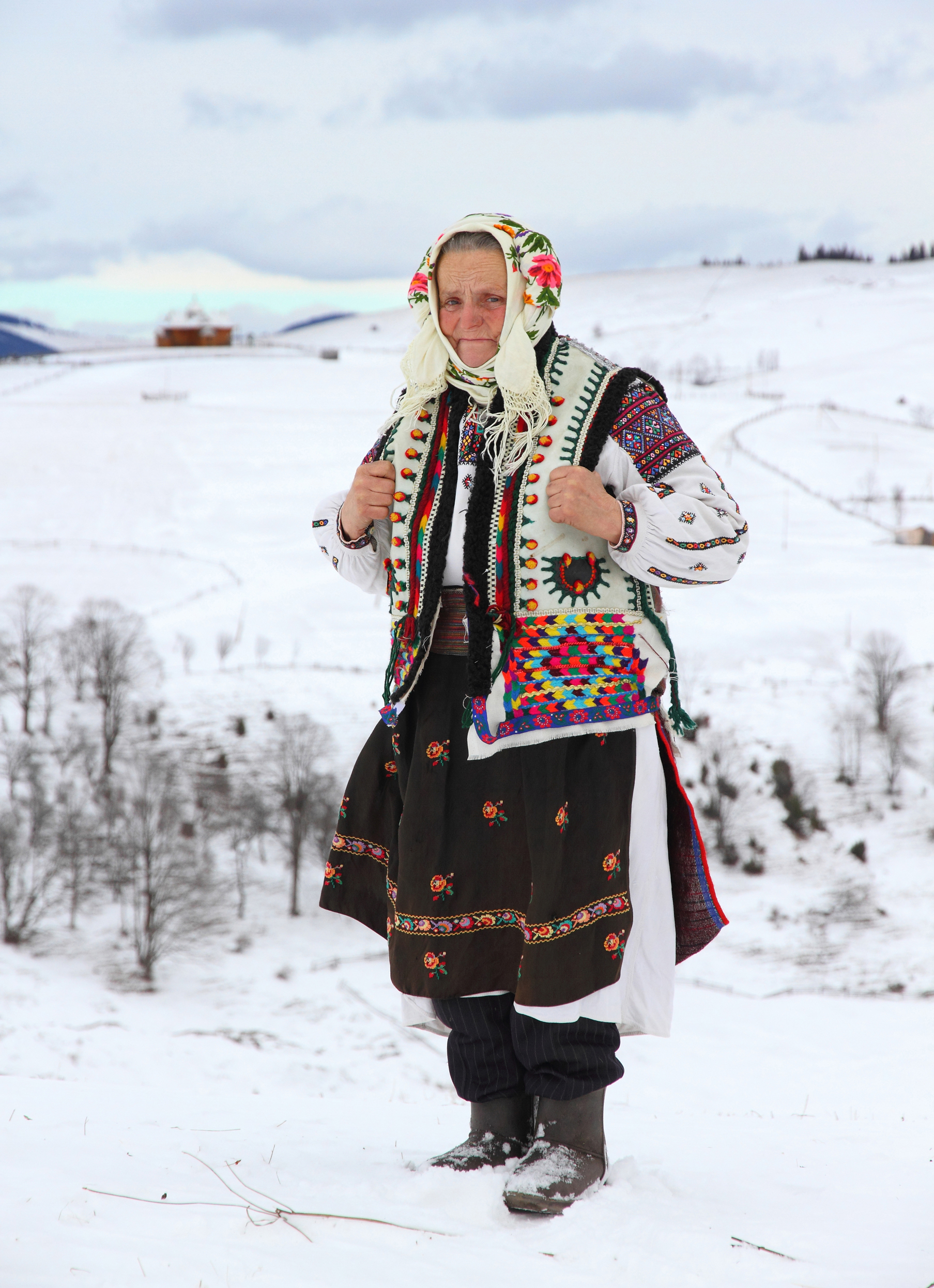
Carpathians
