= Orans of Kyiv =

Mosaic in Saint Sophia Cathedral, Kyiv

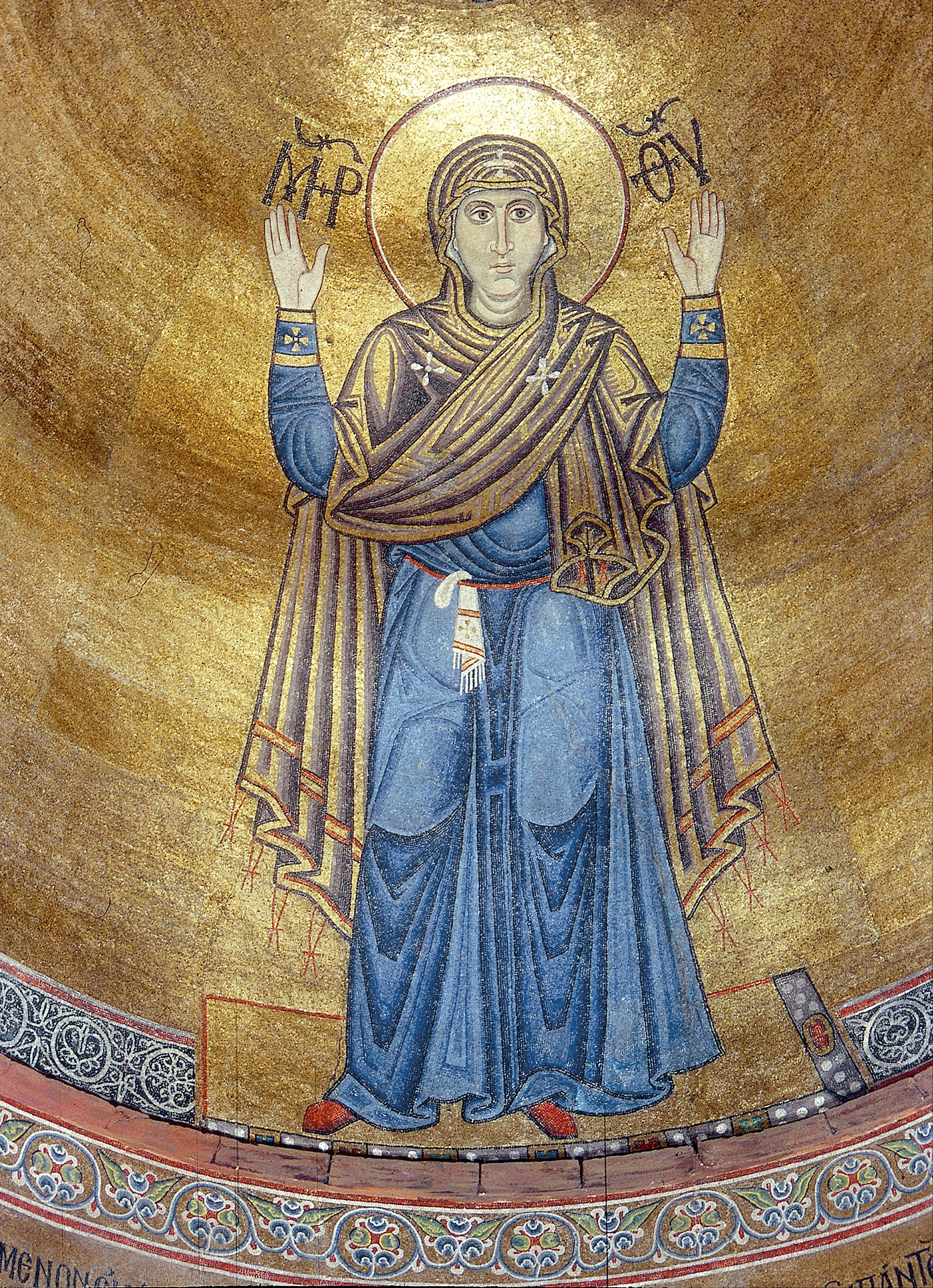
Virgin Orans icon in Kyiv

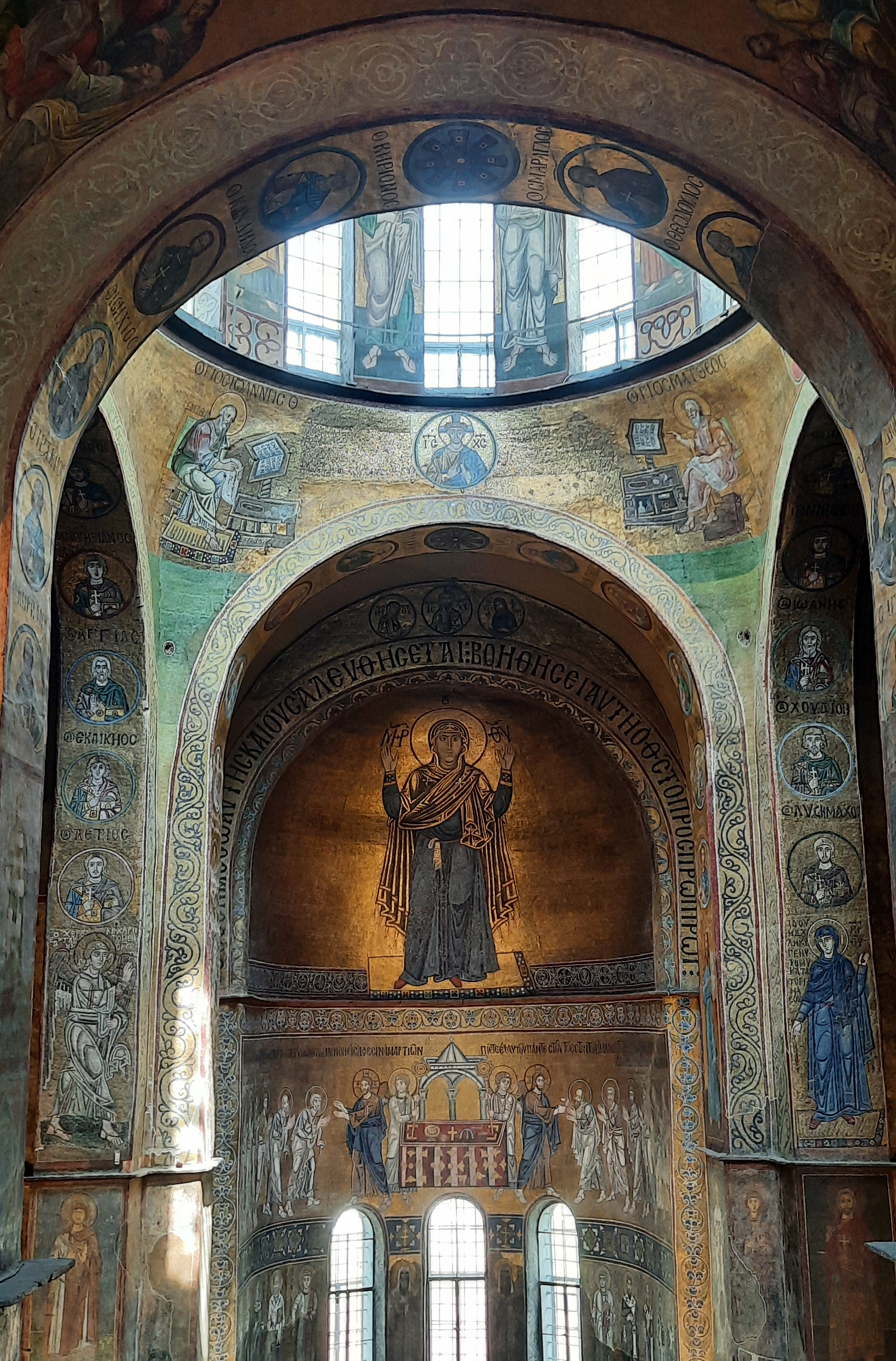
Common mosaic view, Saint Sophia Cathedral

The Virgin Orans, Oranta (The Great Panagia) (Ukrainian: Оранта) is a well-known Orthodox Christian depiction of the Virgin Mary in prayer with extended arms. The 6-meter-high mosaic is located in the vault of the chancel of Saint Sophia Cathedral in Kyiv in Ukraine. The icon has been present in the cathedral since its foundation by Yaroslav I the Wise in the 11th century.

The Virgin's solemn and static posture, the characteristic folds of her garments, and her pensive expression indicate the design was strongly influenced by Byzantine art.

The image is considered one of the greatest sacred symbols in Ukraine, a palladion defending the people of the country. It has been called an "Indestructible Wall" or "Unmoveable Wall". Legend says that as long as the Theotokos is extending Her arms over Kyiv, the city will stand indestructible.

The embroidered handkerchief on the belt of the Mother of God is popularly thought to be for wiping away the tears of those who come before her with their problems and concerns.

In 1997, the National Bank of Ukraine issued commemorative coins "Orante" ("Oranta") within the "Spiritual Treasures of Ukraine" series.

== See also ==
- Orans
