= Shearling coat =

Outerwear made from sheepskin or pelt

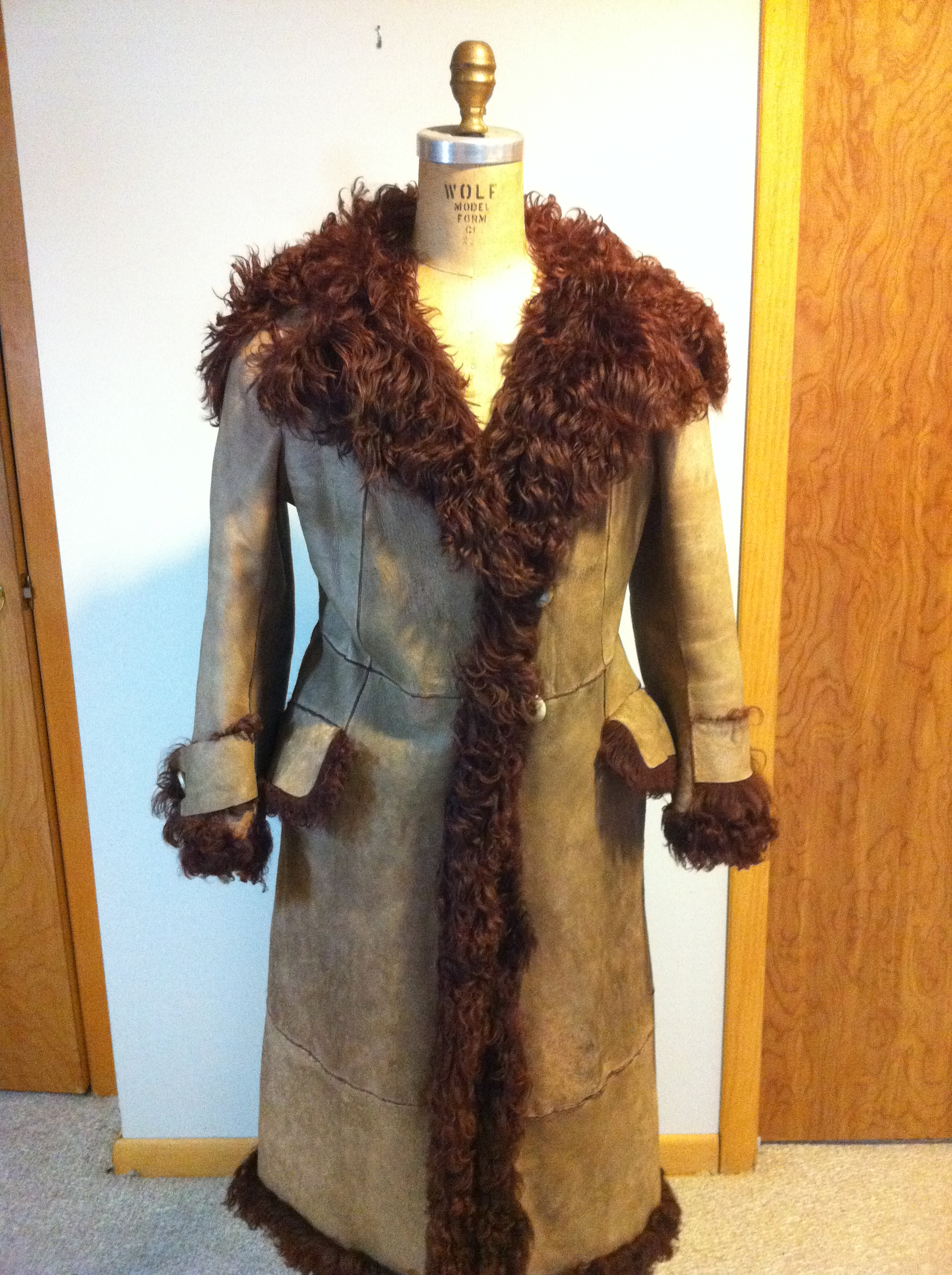
A shearling coat

Shearling coats are a type of coat made from processed lambskin, sheepskin, or pelt. This "shearing" process creates a uniform depth of the wool fibers for a uniform feel and look. Shearling coats and garments are made from pelts by tanning them with the wool of uniform depth still on them. The result is a soft, natural fleece material that is heavy due to thickness of outer skin and degree of fur on the inside, which is quite dense. The length of the sheep fur can be fairly long, but it is typically cropped short to about five centimetres or two inches. Most find these coats to be extremely comfortable and warm. Due to the high quality and uniqueness of shearling, coats and garment are considered luxurious. Sheepskin and Shearling are synonymous. The outer must be sheepskin to be Shearling on the inside. Varieties of Shearling coats include the Afghan coats, which often feature a unique type of shearling from the native Karakul sheep of the region.

== See also ==
- Sheepskin boots
