= Kozhushanka =

The kozhushanka (Ukrainian: кожушанка) is a traditional Ukrainian sheepskin coat.

Kozhushankas were winter attires worn by women, typically in the middle Dnieper River region, including the Left-Bank and steppe areas, and also in the Lemko region, particularly in the central regions. They are thought to have originated in the Cossack Hetmanate period. The coats varied in color from region to region.

In the Lemko areas, the Kozhushanka was worn on top of the blouse. It was designed to resemble the traditional Lemko korset bodice, but without wedges at the bottom. It was made of cherry-colored velvet, lined by homemade coarse cloth or linen. The edges were trimmed with black sheepskin or other differently dyed material. It was embellished by a couple of bouquets of various color and, like most Ukrainian clothing of the time, embroidered, particularly on the chest.

In Canada, Ukrainian immigrants were often singled out by their sheepskin coats, and detractors such as politician Frank Oliver said they looked more like beasts than men. However, then interior minister Clifford Sifton (in charge of immigration) defended the "stalwart peasant in a sheepskin coat, born on the soil, whose forefathers have been farmers for ten generations, with a stout wife and a half-dozen children". In any event, when Oliver replaced Sifton as minister of the interior, Ukrainian immigration continued apace, but the kozhushanka was increasingly dropped by the Ukrainians in Canada favor of Western garments.

== See also ==
- Kozhukh
