= Ivan Honchar Museum =

Museum in Kyiv, Ukraine

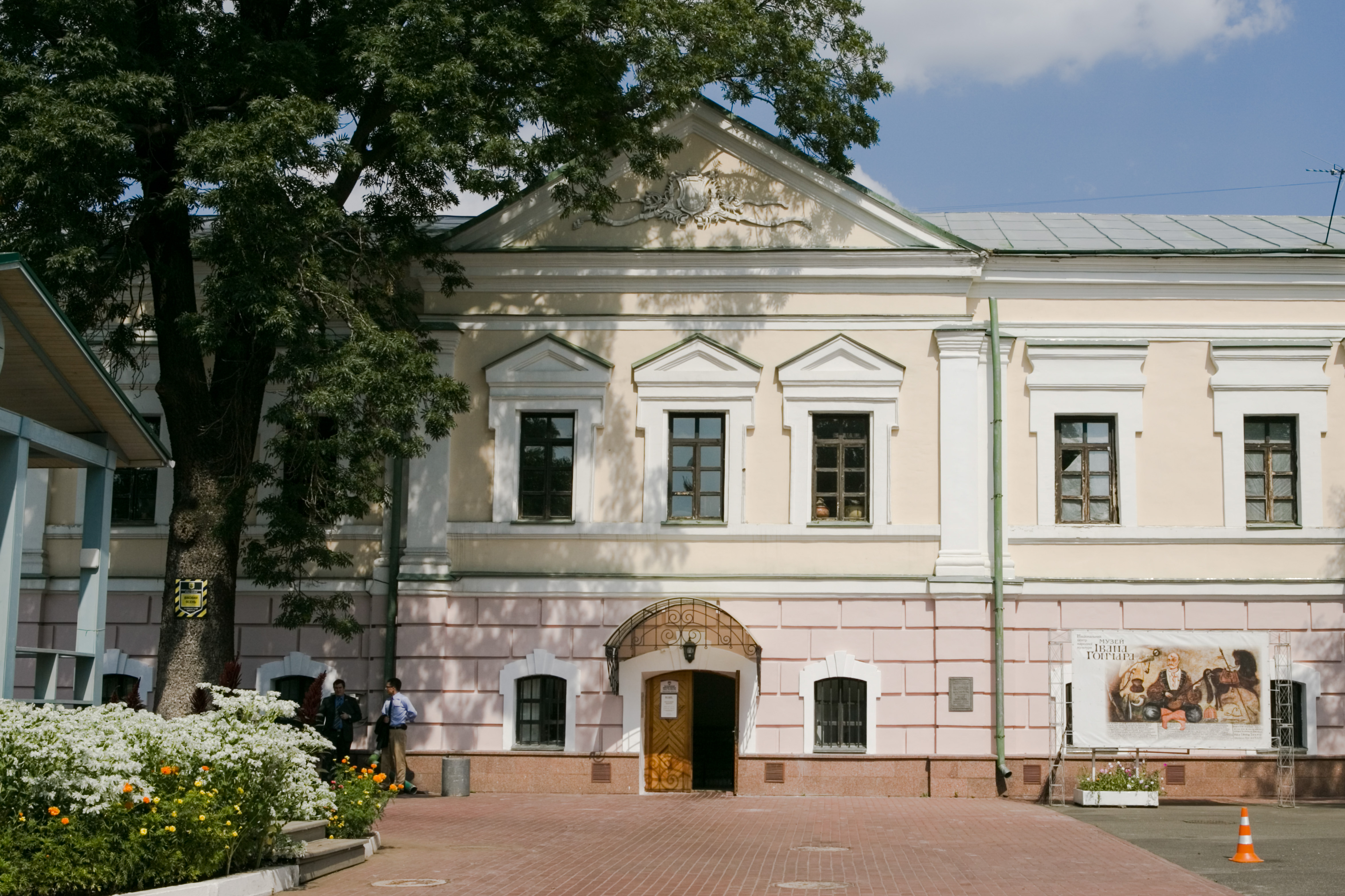
- Ivan Honchar Museum
- Interactive fullscreen map
- Established: September 1993
- Location: 19, Lavrska, Kyiv, 01015
- Coordinates: 50°25′56″N 30°33′28″E
- Director: Petro Honchar
- Website: honchar.org.ua

The Ivan Honchar Museum (official name: National Centre of Folk Culture "Ivan Honchar Museum", Ukrainian: Національний центр народної культури «Музей Івана Гончара») is a museum in Kyiv, Ukraine showcasing the culture of Ukraine and preserving Ukrainian folk art.

The museum was founded on a private collection of Ivan Honchar shortly after his death in 1993. During the Soviet period, Ivan Honchar was accused of nationalism. Each individual showing an interest in his private collection was registered with the KGB.

== Collection ==
The collection consists of over 15,000 items from the 16th to the early 20th centuries. A good example is a painting of the Ukrainian folklore hero Cossack Mamay. Other items include over 500 icons from the 16th century, 100 paintings by famous Ukrainian artists, an impressive collection of over 2,500 items of textiles from the 18th and 19th centuries, pottery, toys, Easter eggs, wood carvings and Ukrainian folk music instruments. Another part of the museum consists of Honchar's private library with books containing material that had the possessor sent to prison during Soviet times.

The Museum is a living institution, not only a collection of exhibits. There are folk art studios, shops, a theatre of folk songs and folklore, Ukrainian cuisine hands-on classes and other courses.

The musician Oleh Skrypka, (frontman of Vopli Vidopliassova) each year organizes vechornytsi ("evening gatherings") at the centre, which include folklore singing, dances, customs etc.

The museum conducts ethnological research, field expeditions, organizes scientific conferences, and cultural and artistic events (including the "Orly" festival), and establishes connections with folk artists, other bearers of traditional culture, and its researchers. The museum aims to comprehensively highlight Ukrainian traditional culture considering its integrity and uniqueness, the revival of national consciousness, preservation, and development of the best traditions of Ukrainian folk art, and perpetuating the memory of Ivan Honchar.

== Activities ==
The center conducts ethnological research, field expeditions, organizes scientific conferences and cultural events (including the Oreli festival), and establishes contacts with folk artists, other traditional culture carriers and researchers. The museum aims to provide comprehensive coverage of Ukrainian traditional culture, taking into account its integrity and originality, revival of national consciousness, preservation and development of the best traditions of Ukrainian folk art, and perpetuation of Ivan Makarovych Honchar's memory.

In 2018, the Ivan Honchar Museum joined the charity photo project "Sincere" organized by the Domosfera shopping center and the Gres Todorchuk communication agency. The main goal of the project was to popularize Ukrainian folk costumes of the XIX century. From November 14 to December 2, the museum hosted an exhibition of photographs of Ukrainian artists in national costumes. The opening of the exhibition included master classes on making festive attributes, performances by Nina Matvienko and members of the Dakh Daughters band Natalka Galanevych and Solomiya Melnyk, as well as a concert of traditional instrumental music from Poltava region. All profits from the sale of calendars with photos of the "stars" in national costumes were used to reconstruct the museum.

On May 26, 2020, the Honchar Museum was attacked by a group of SBI officers who broke down the front door of the building. Later, the media reported that the reason for the attack was the case against P. Poroshenko regarding the transportation of 43 paintings across the customs border, and screenshots of Wikipedia pages were used as evidence in this case.

== Gallery ==
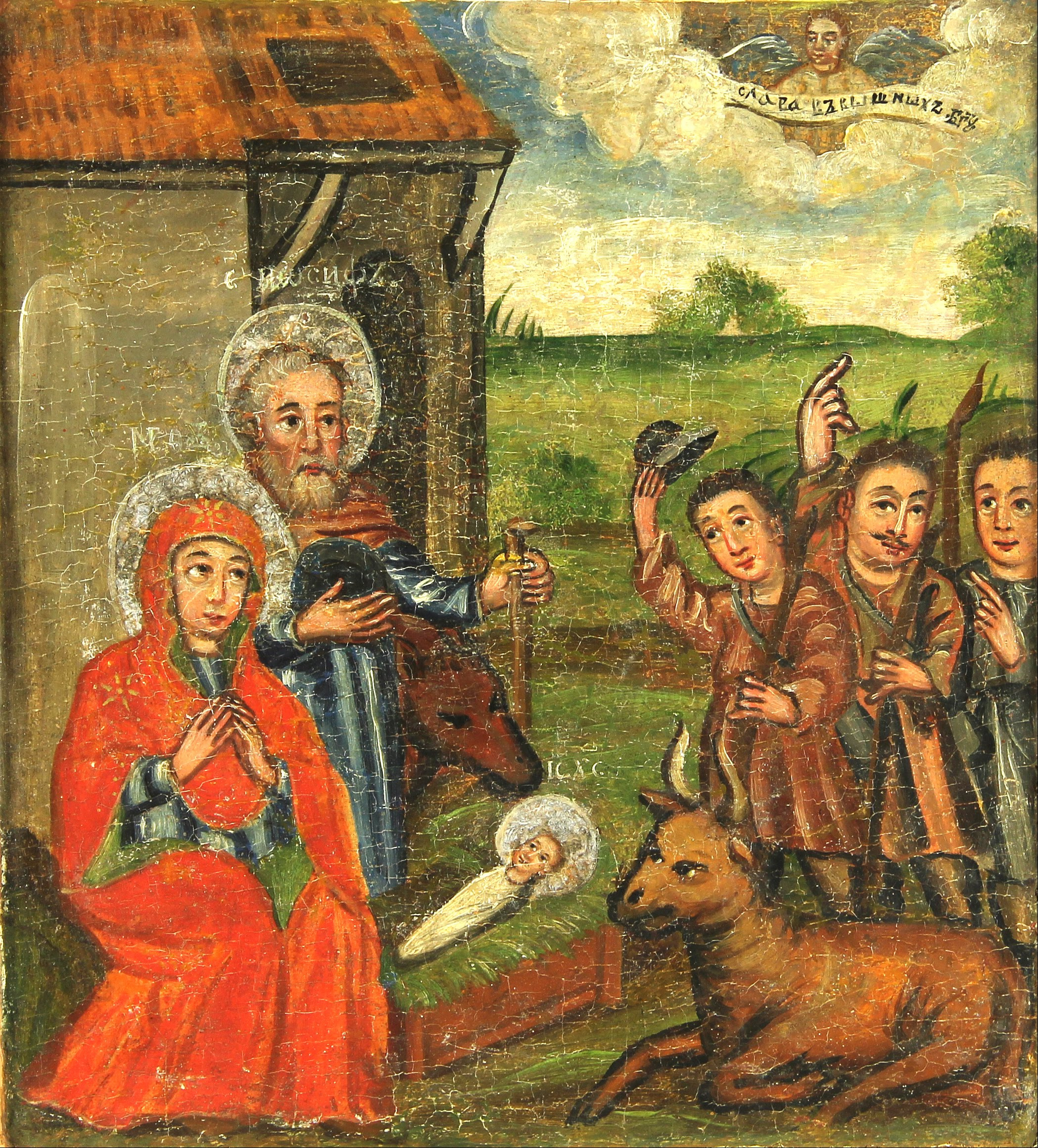
Religious icon depicting the Adoration of the Shepherds. Artist unknown, between 1650 and 1700.

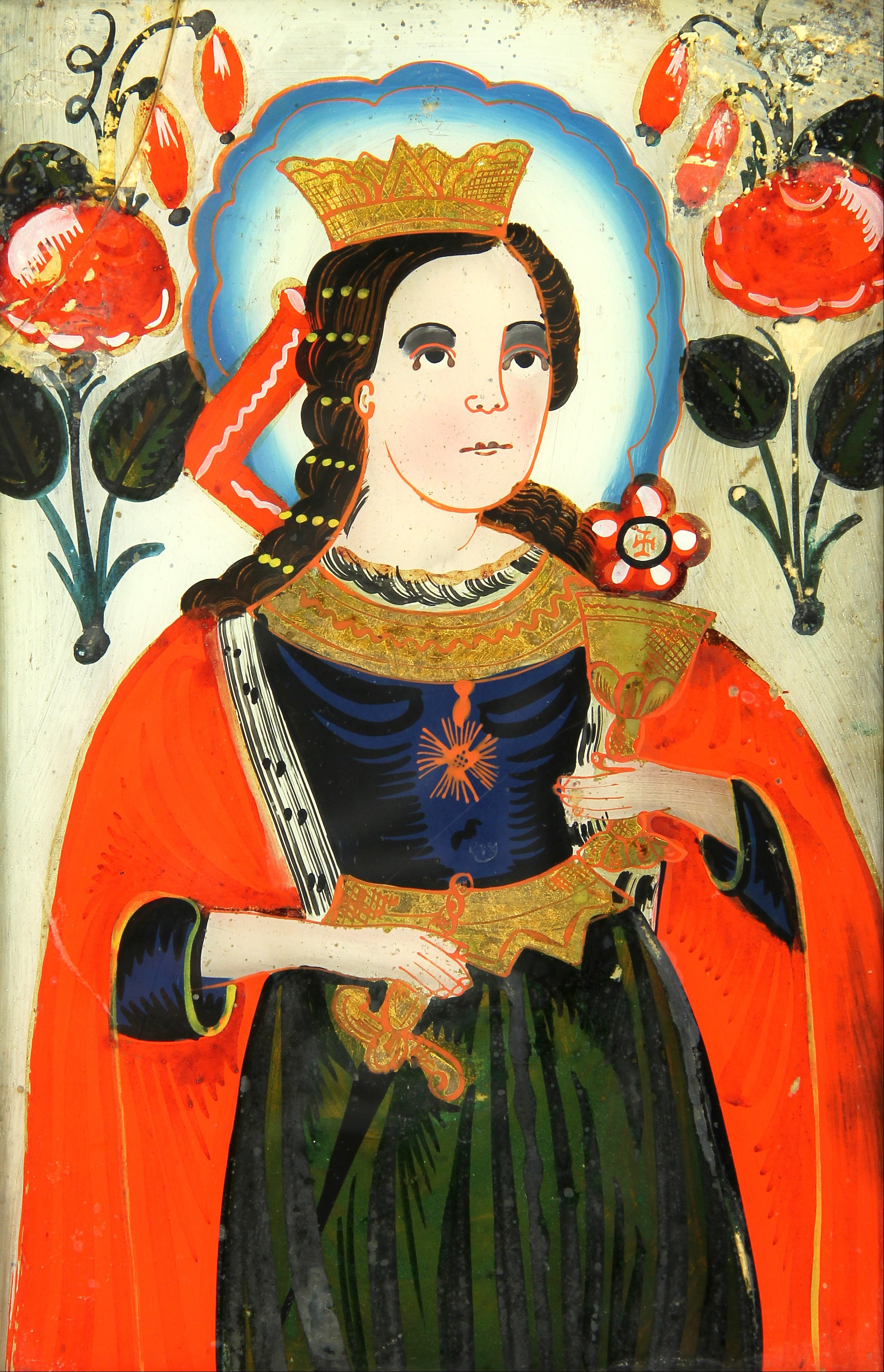
Saint Varvara, 1810/1838.

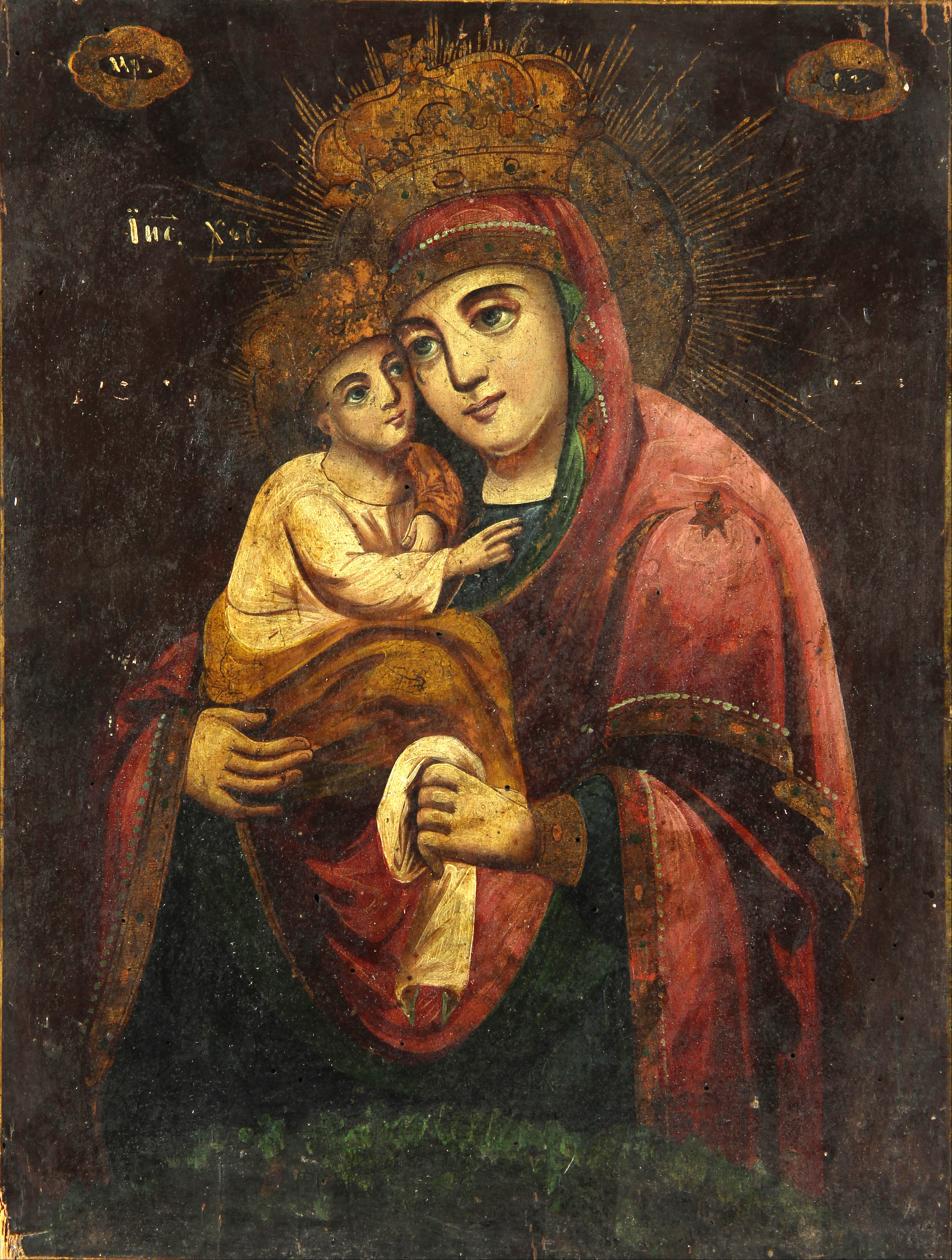
The Virgin of Pochaiv, 1840/1860.

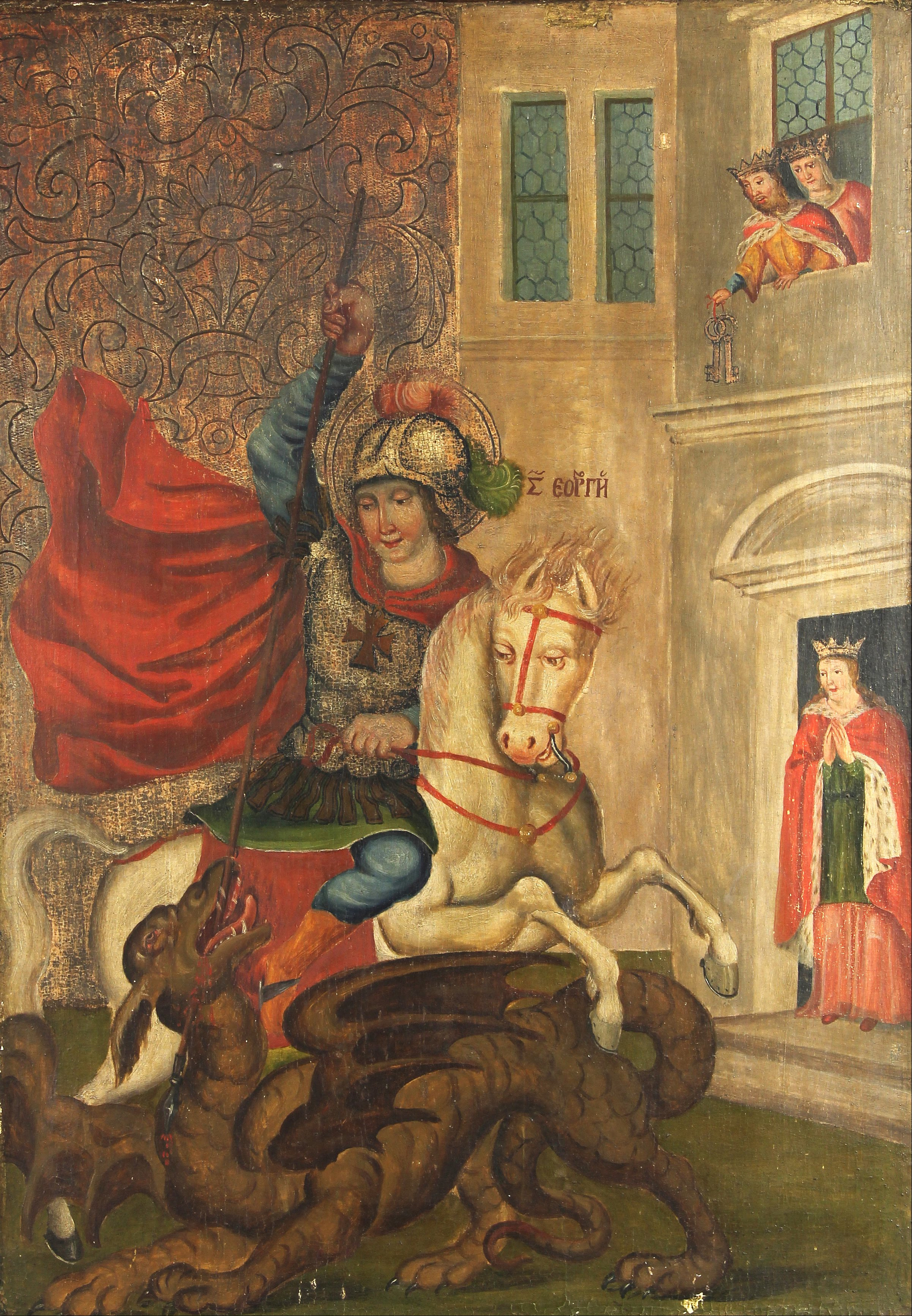
St. George the Victorious, 1700/1740.

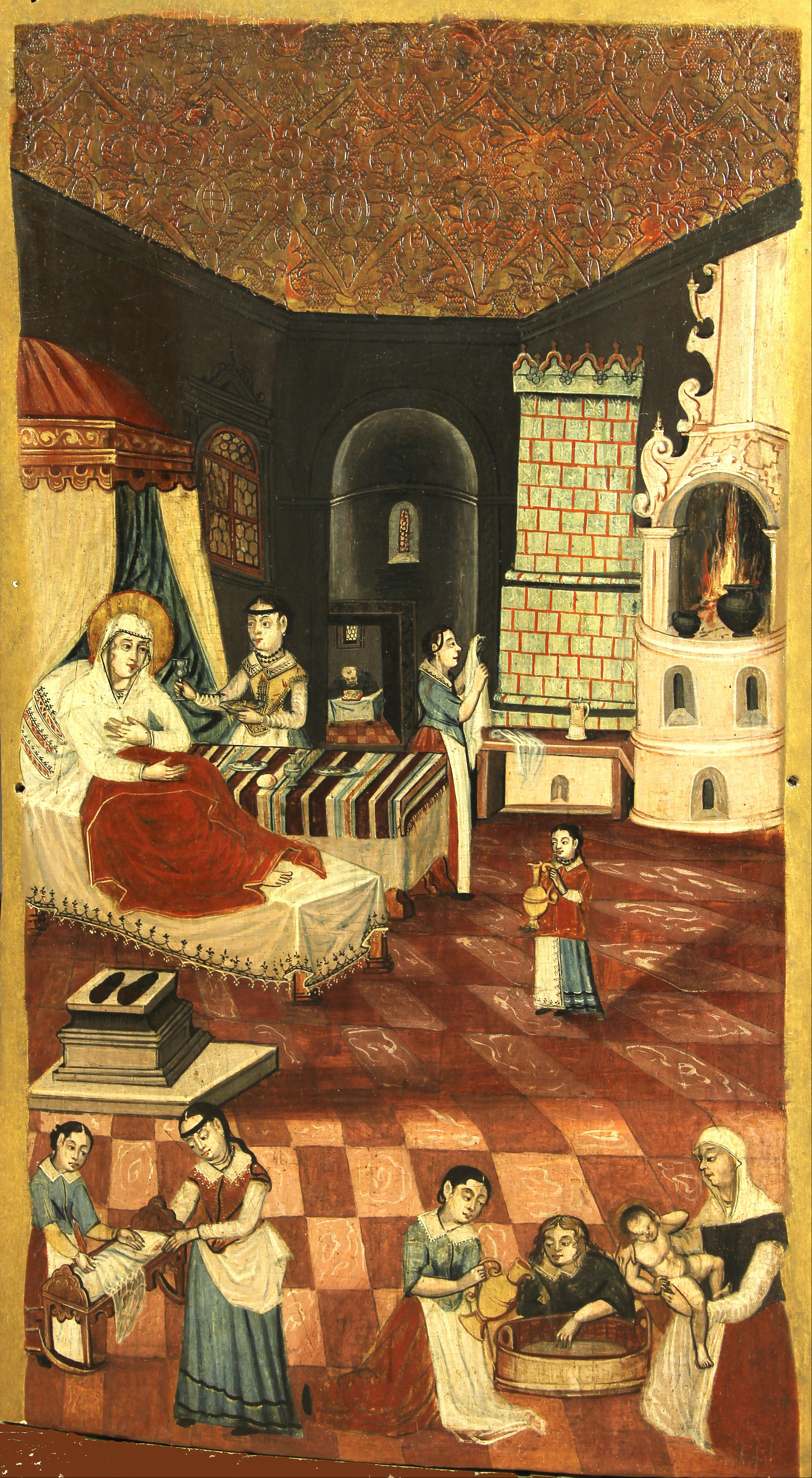
The Nativity of the Virgin, 1690/1710.

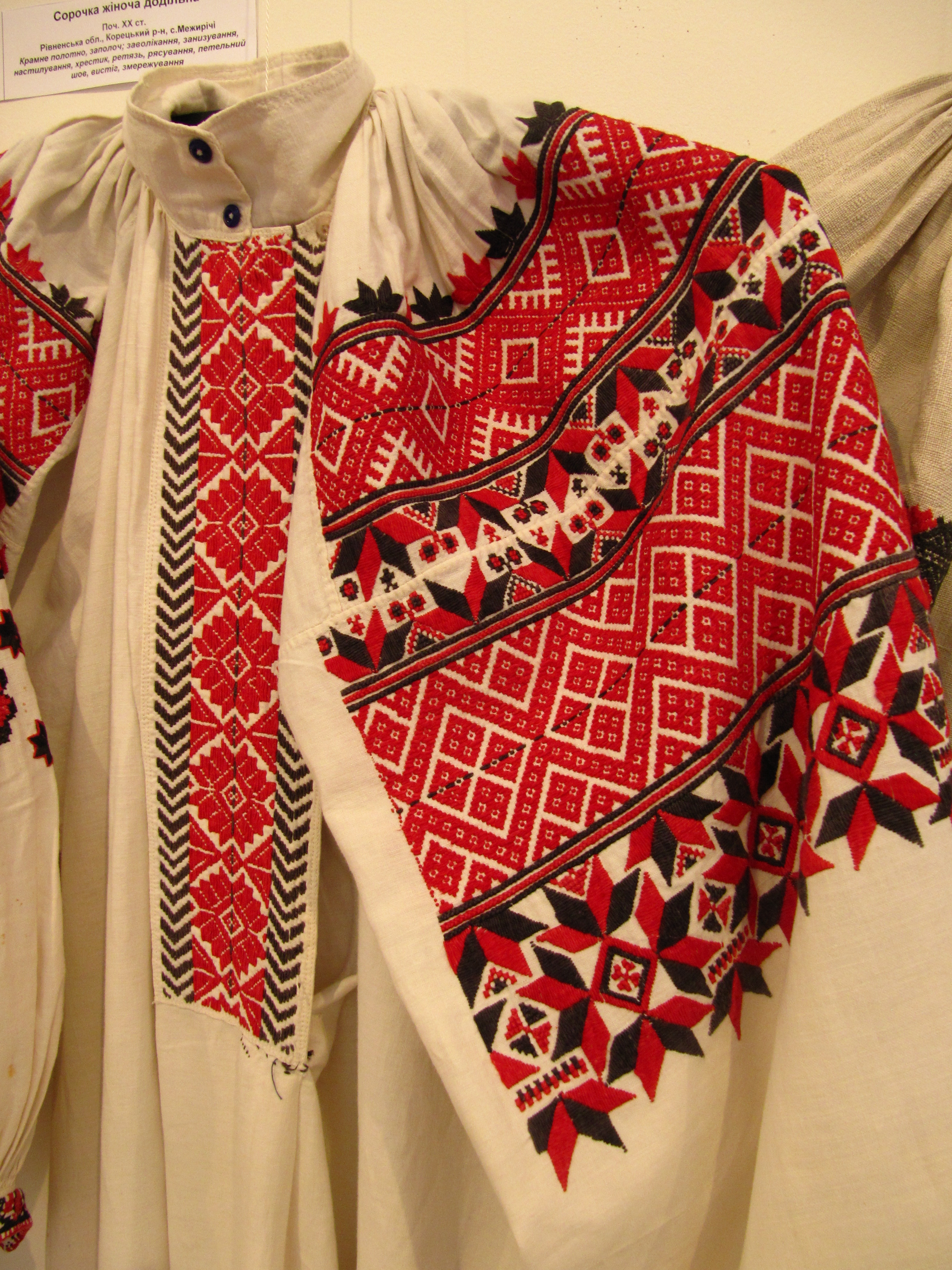
Vyshyvanka.
