= Kozhukh =

Traditional Ukrainian fur coat

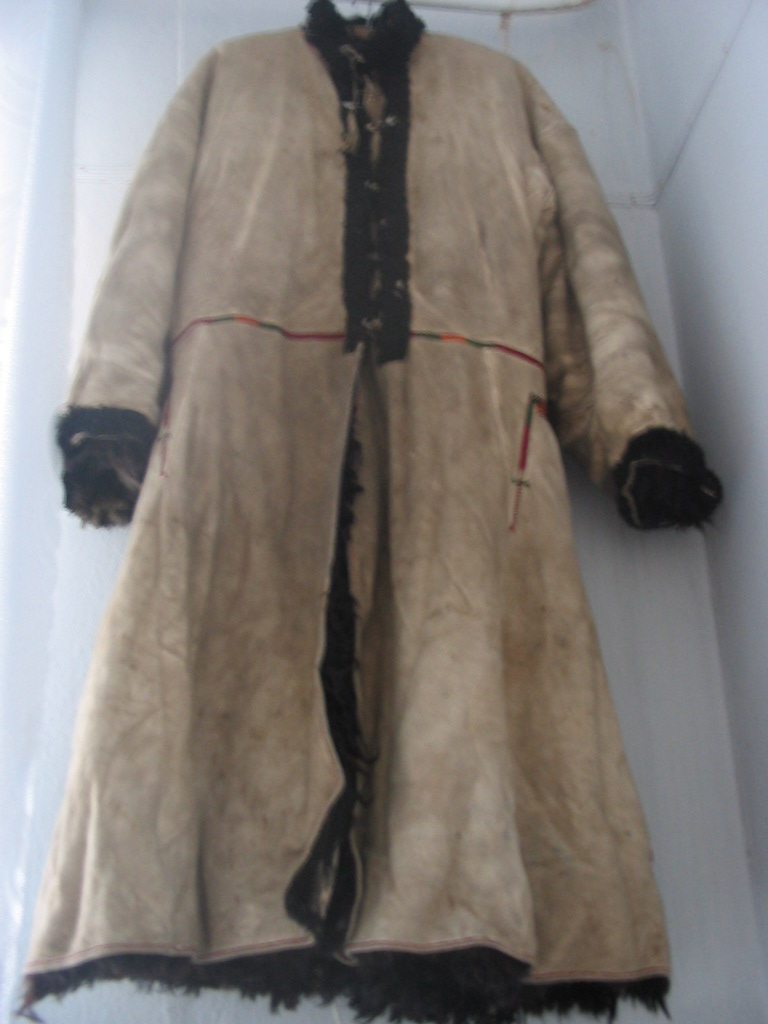
Kozhukh in the Buchach Museum

A kozhukh (Ukrainian: кожух) is a traditional Ukrainian fur coat.

Generally worn in the winter, the kozhukh was normally made of sheepskin, sometimes decorated with embroidery and with leather, cords, tassels, and other accessories. They were tight at the waist, sometimes very long. There were two main variations, those with straight backs and those with detached backs.

Variations of the kozhukh were worn throughout Ukraine, but it was primarily used in the middle Dnieper River region, including the Left Bank and steppe areas, and in Polissya. They were especially popular during the Cossack Hetmanate period, though they were also worn during the Kievan Rus' period. In the last decade, coats based on the traditional Kozhukh have become fashionable again in Ukraine.

== Popular culture ==
In History Channel's production Vikings the character prince Oleg "the prophet" is frequently seen wearing kozhukhs.
