= Sheepskin =

Hide of a sheep

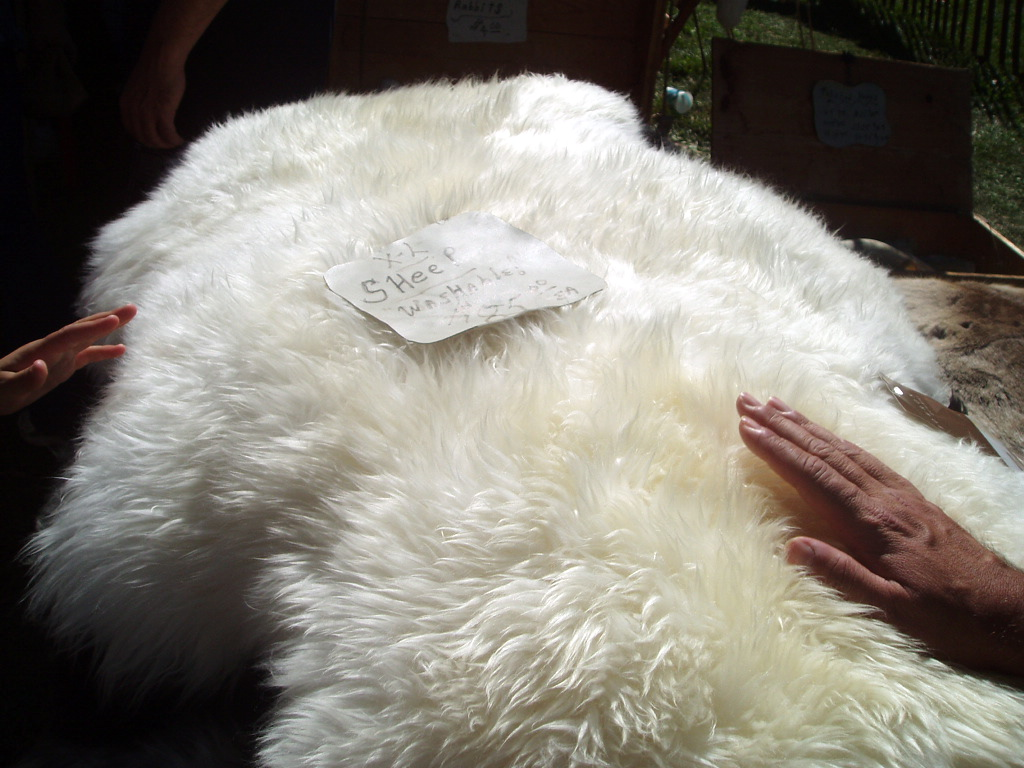
A whole sheepskin

Sheepskin is the hide of a sheep, sometimes also called lambskin. Unlike common leather, sheepskin is tanned with the fleece intact, as in a pelt.

== Uses ==
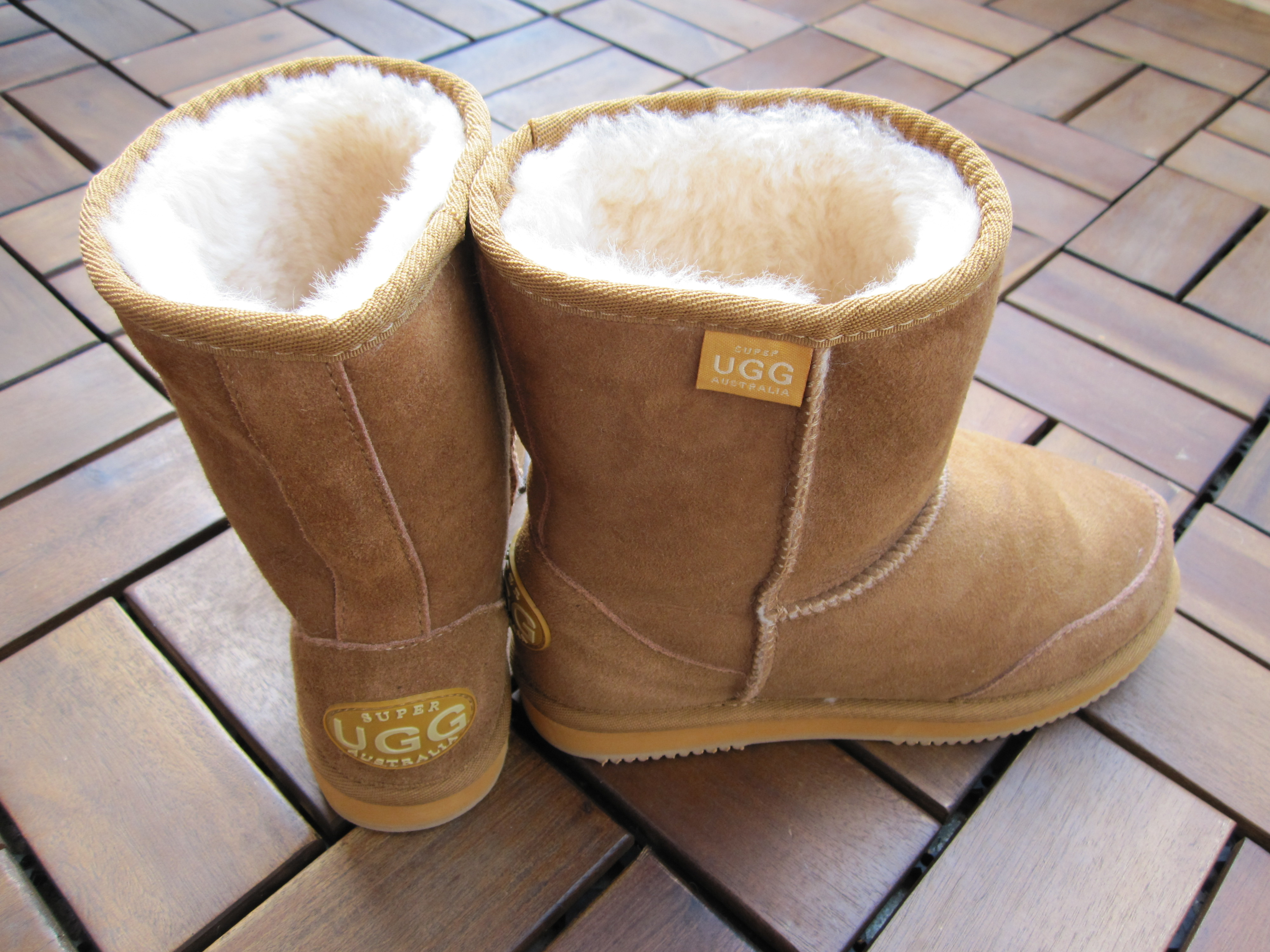
Ugg boots are traditionally made from sheepskin.

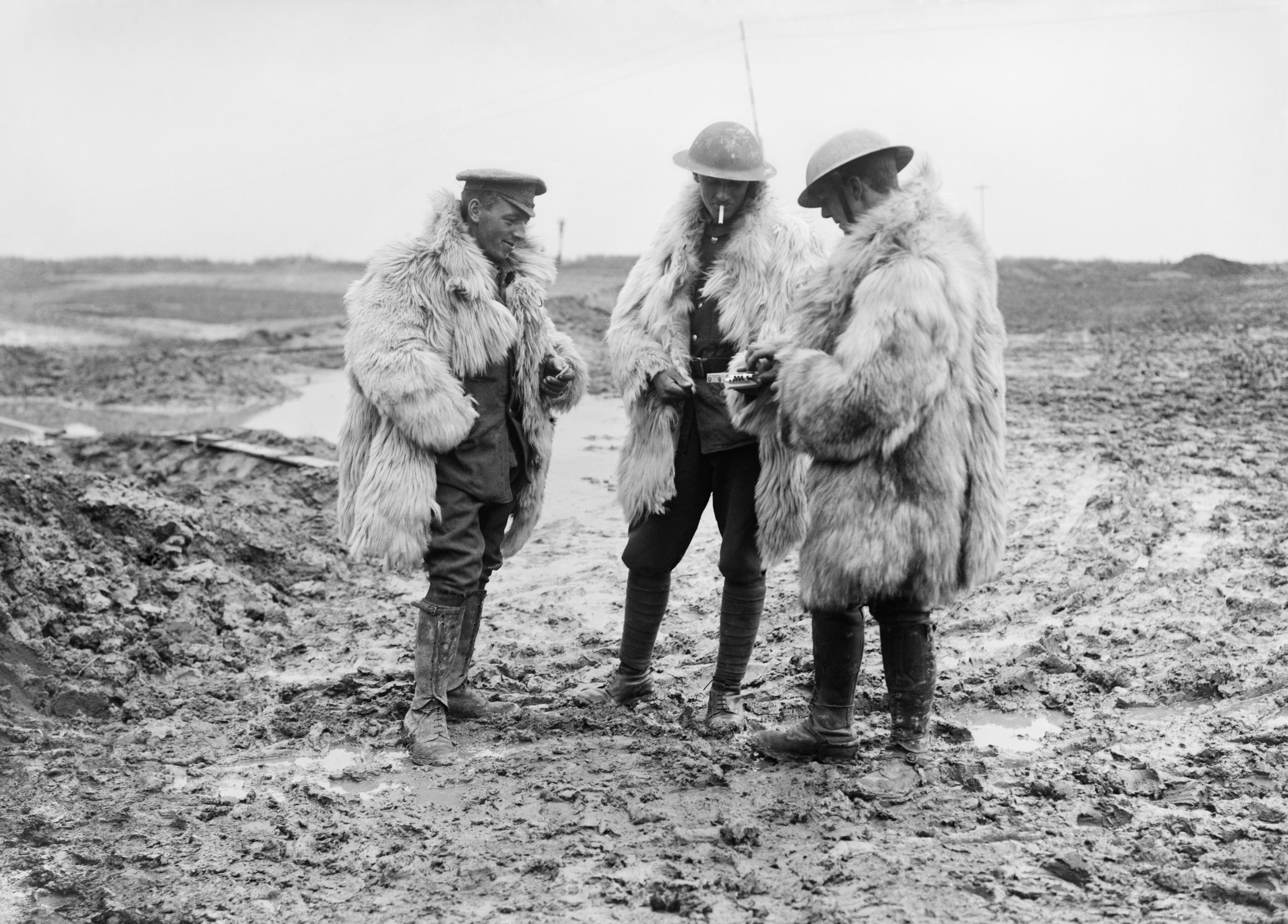
Three soldiers wearing sheepskin coats, 1916

Sheepskin is used to produce sheepskin leather products and soft wool-lined clothing or coverings, including gloves, hats, slippers, footstools, automotive seat covers, baby and knee rugs and pelts. Sheepskin numnahs, saddle pads, saddle seat covers, sheepskin horse boots, tack linings and girth tubes are also made and used in equestrianism.

The fleece of sheepskin has excellent insulating properties and it is also resistant to flame and static electricity. Sheepskin is a natural insulator, and draws perspiration away from the wearer and into the fibers. There, it traps between 30 and 36 percent of its own weight in moisture, and it is for this reason that sheepskin is commonly used to make chamois leather.

Testing at the Royal Melbourne Hospital and the CSIRO Textile and Fibre Technology Leather Research Centre confirmed the advantages of medical sheepskin in the prevention and treatment of pressure ulcers.

Sheepskin coats, vests, and boots are common in the traditional dress of peoples throughout the Old World (wherever sheep are raised). They seem to be especially popular in the steppes of Eastern European and Northern Asia, and according to the French knight Robert de Clari, they were part of the national costume of the Cuman people who lived there circa 1200CE. In Ukraine a sheepskin coat is called a kozhukh and a vest a kozhushanka are an iconic part of the national costume, while in Russia the same coat was usually called tulup (ru:тулуп (одежда)). In Spain such a coat is called a zamarra, in Tibet a chuba, in Kazakh a ton, in Romania a cojoc. In the English-speaking world, one may speak of a shearling coat. During the 1970s in Britain the suedehead subculture adopted this item as an identifying fashion, and it also had some popularity with hippies in North America. Sheepskin-lined Ugg boots became popular worldwide in the late 1990s.

The use of sheepskin seat covers in moving vehicles dates back centuries, perhaps as long ago as the Bronze Age, when wagons and carriages were first used. The more sophisticated, tailor-made sheepskin car seat covers of the modern era have been popular in Europe for decades, and grew in great popularity in the United States in the mid 1970s.

== Quality ==
The quality of the skin used in each application depends on several factors, mostly whether the pelt, which is the back of the hide, will be visible or not. Where the pelt is visible, better quality hide with minimal seed will be used.

Seed contamination is where patches of scar tissue remain, resulting from a healed seed burrow wound during the animal's life. This scar tissue can fall out leaving small holes after the pelt is processed or it can remain in place leaving imperfections in the pelt which cannot be corrected. Seed contamination is graded as follows:

1. "No Visible Seed" - Visually free of seed contamination. This does not however mean the skin is completely free of seed, only visually free.
2. "Light Seed" - Slight seed contamination visible in the wool but minimal mainly concentrated in the belly regions.
3. "Medium Seed" - Light seed contamination is present over most of the wool surface but is concentrated around the belly area and the legs.
4. "Heavy Seed" - Heavy contamination extending through the majority of the wool but especially prevalent around the belly area and the legs.
5. "Burry" - Wool contaminated with hard seed. Can vary from light to heavy concentration. This level of seed can cause problems if it is not removed before fleshing starts as the rollers can sometimes punch them through the skin.

In general, wool affected by skin diseases is not usable. Other problems include louse infestation, dead wool and regrowth.

Skins are classed, packed and sold in standardized wool lengths:

- Bares (newly shorn)
- 1/8–1/4 inch (3–6 mm)
- 1/4–1/2 inch (6–13 mm)
- 1/2–1 inch (13–25 mm)
- 1–2 inches (25–51 mm)
- 2–4 inches (51–102 mm) (Full wools)

== Mouton fur ==
Mouton fur (North America) or beaver lamb (UK) is sheepskin which has been processed to resemble beaver or seal fur (mouton is French for "sheep"). Mouton fur is lambskin whose hair has been straightened, chemically treated, and thermally set to produce a moisture-repellent finish. Mouton is often dyed brown to resemble beaver, but it is also made in many other colors.

== See also ==
- Shearling
- Calfskin
- The pelt of newborn or fetal Karakul sheep is specially appreciated.
