= Vodiane, Znamianka urban hromada =

Village in Kirovohrad Oblast, Ukraine

Vodiane Водяне
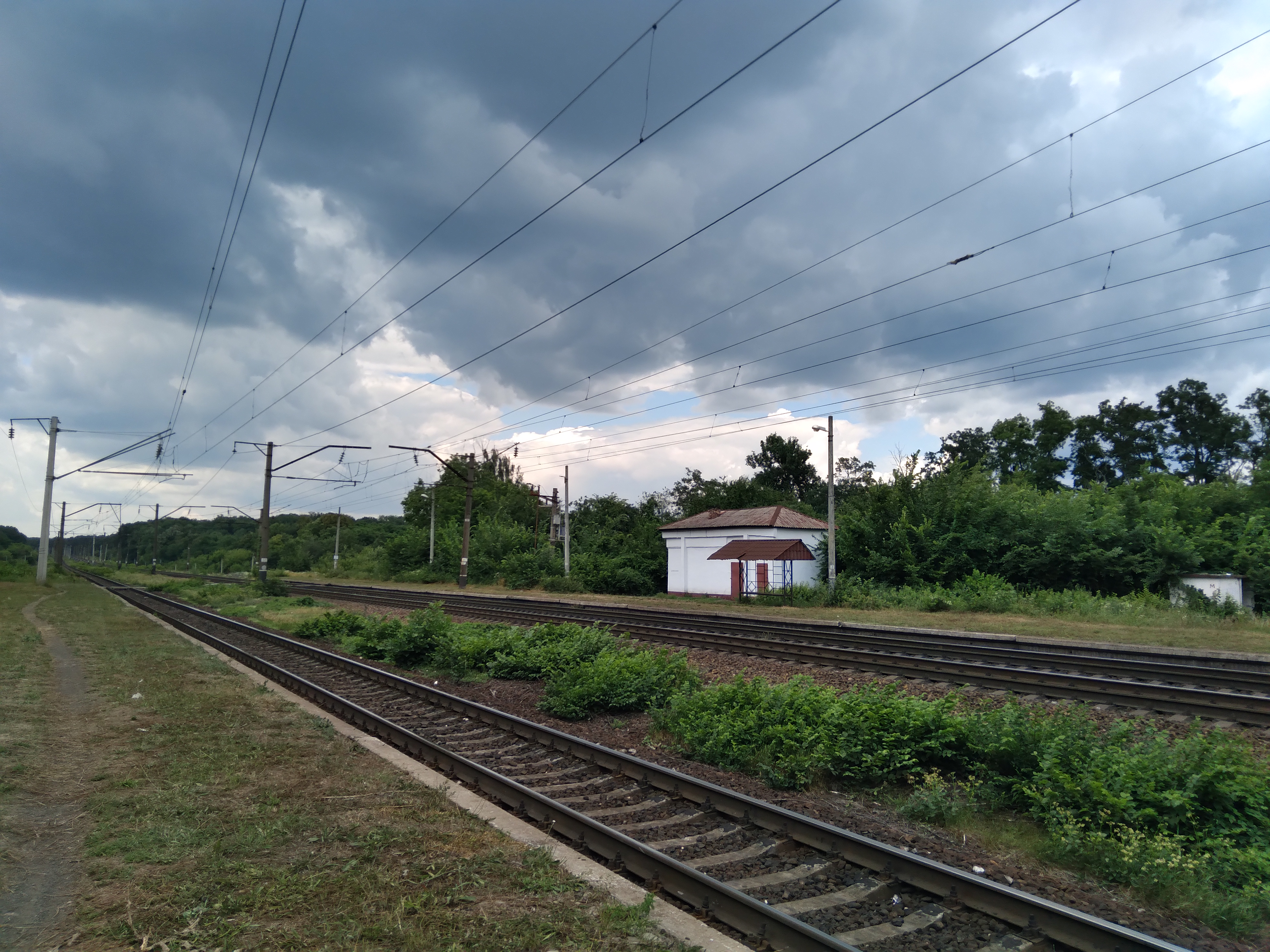
- railway station near the village

- Location within Ukraine Location within Ukraine Kirovohrad Oblast
- Coordinates: 48°42′49″N 32°40′24″E
- Country: Ukraine
- Oblast: Kirovohrad Oblast
- Raion: Kropyvnytskyi Raion
- Founded: 1888

Area
  - Total: 05 km^{2} (1.9 sq mi)
- Postal code: 27413

Vodiane (Ukrainian: Водяне) is a village in central Ukraine, Kropyvnytskyi Raion, Kirovohrad Oblast, in Znamianka urban hromada. It has a population of 189 (2022 estimate).

== Geography ==
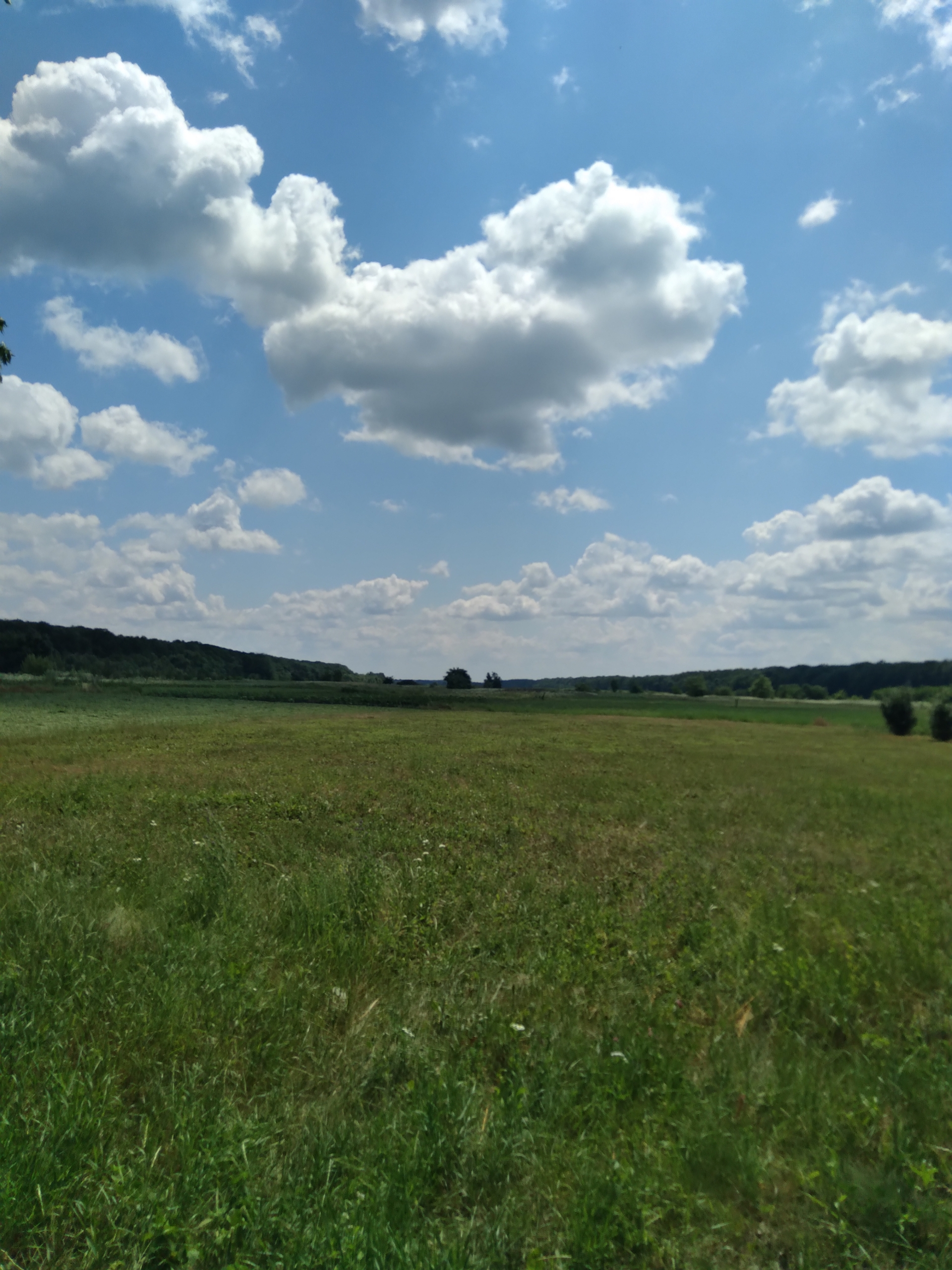
Field in Vodiane

Vodiane is located on the outskirts of the Black Forest, 3 km northwest of Znamianka Druha and 6 km from the city of Znamianka.

== History ==
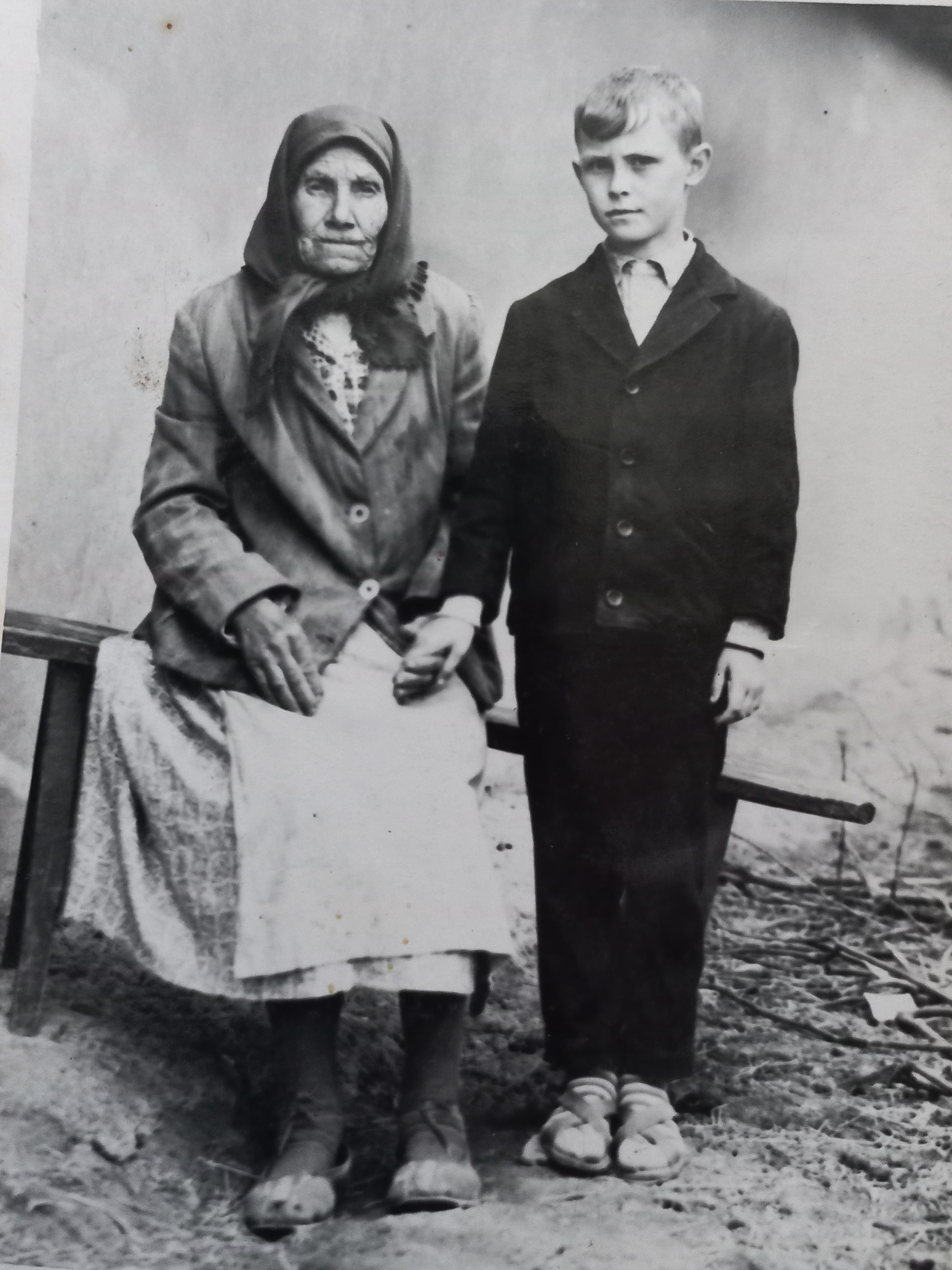
Local hero Lukia Stachenko who saved people from hunger in Znamianka area, abd her older gragrandson

During the Holodomor (1932–1933), at least 17 residents of Vodiane died
