= Petrove, Znamianka urban hromada, Kropyvnytskyi Raion, Kirovohrad Oblast =

Village in Kirovohrad Oblast, Ukraine

Petrove Петрове
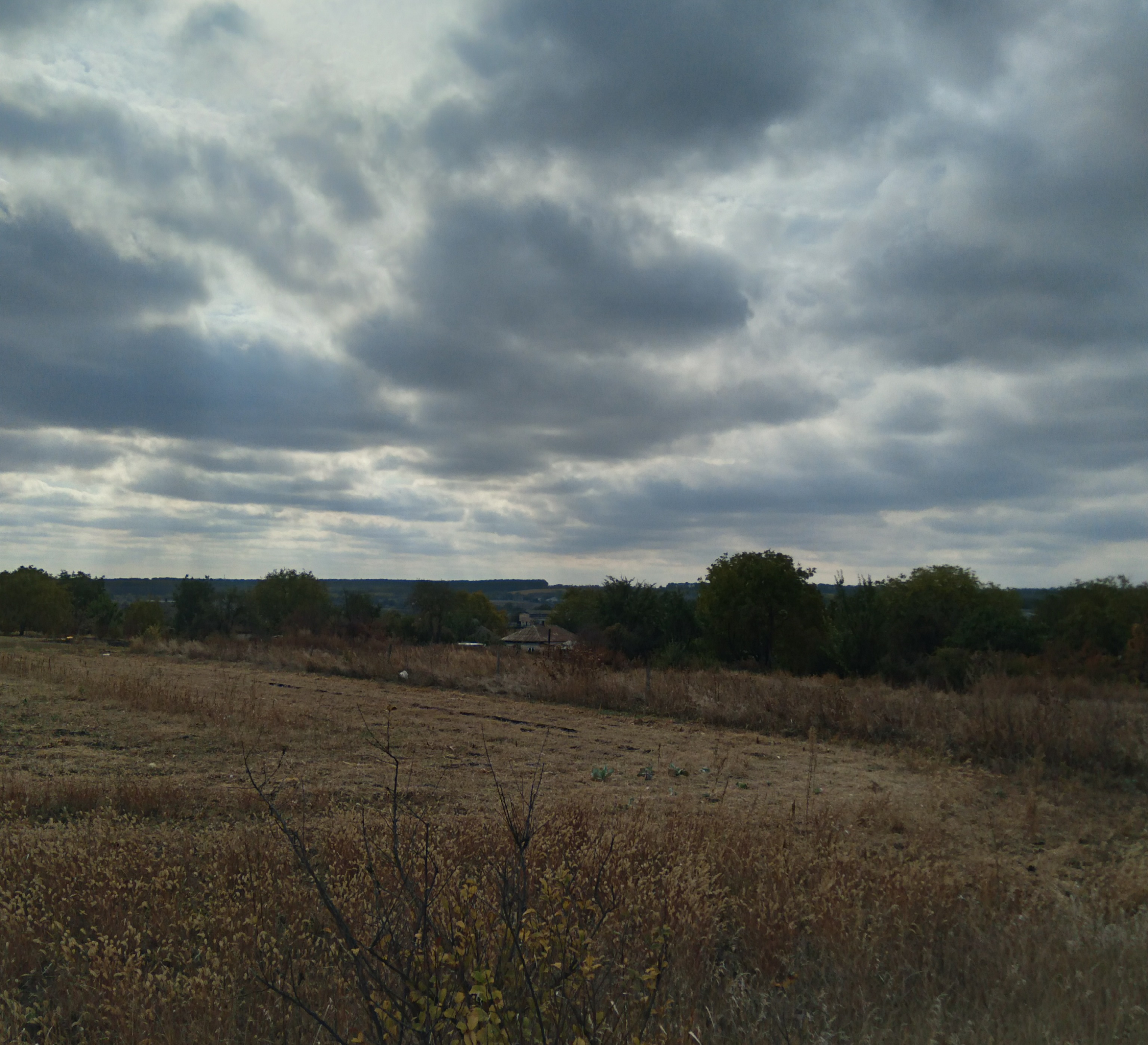

- Location within Ukraine Location within Ukraine Kirovohrad Oblast
- Coordinates: 48°42′49″N 32°40′24″E
- Country: Ukraine
- Oblast: Kirovohrad Oblast
- Raion: Kropyvnytskyi Raion
- Founded: 1725

Area
  - Total: 3,122 km^{2} (1,205 sq mi)

Population (2022)
  - Total: 1,631
  - Density: 0.5224/km^{2} (1.353/sq mi)
- Postal code: 27450

Petrove (Ukrainian: Петрове) is a village in central Ukraine, Kropyvnytskyi Raion, Kirovohrad Oblast, in Znamianka urban hromada. Its population is 1,631 (2022 estimate).

== Geography ==
The village is located on the southern outskirts of Znamianka. The river Balka Orlova flows through its territory, named after the village of the same name founded by a Zaporozhian Cossack nicknamed Orel, which existed here at the beginning of the XVIII century, and in 1958, was annexed to Petrove. Now the entire valley of this river is called Orlova Balka. (lit. Orel's gorge).

== History ==
As of 1886, 337 people lived in the village, there were 73 farmsteads, 3 shops, and a brick factory. 4 miles away, there was a railway station, a cafeteria, 3 benches, and an inn.

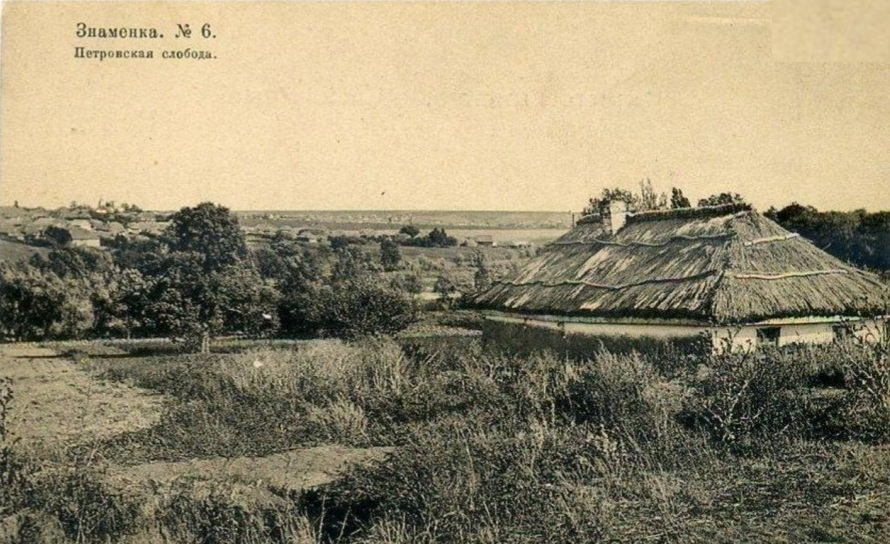
Photo of the village taken between 1907 and 1910

During the Holodomor of 1932–1933, at least 7 villagers died.

The main employer during the 1930s-1980s was a farm, first brigade of which was located in the village of Novooleksandrivka, the second brigade in Petrove, and the third in Sokilnyky of Znamianka district.

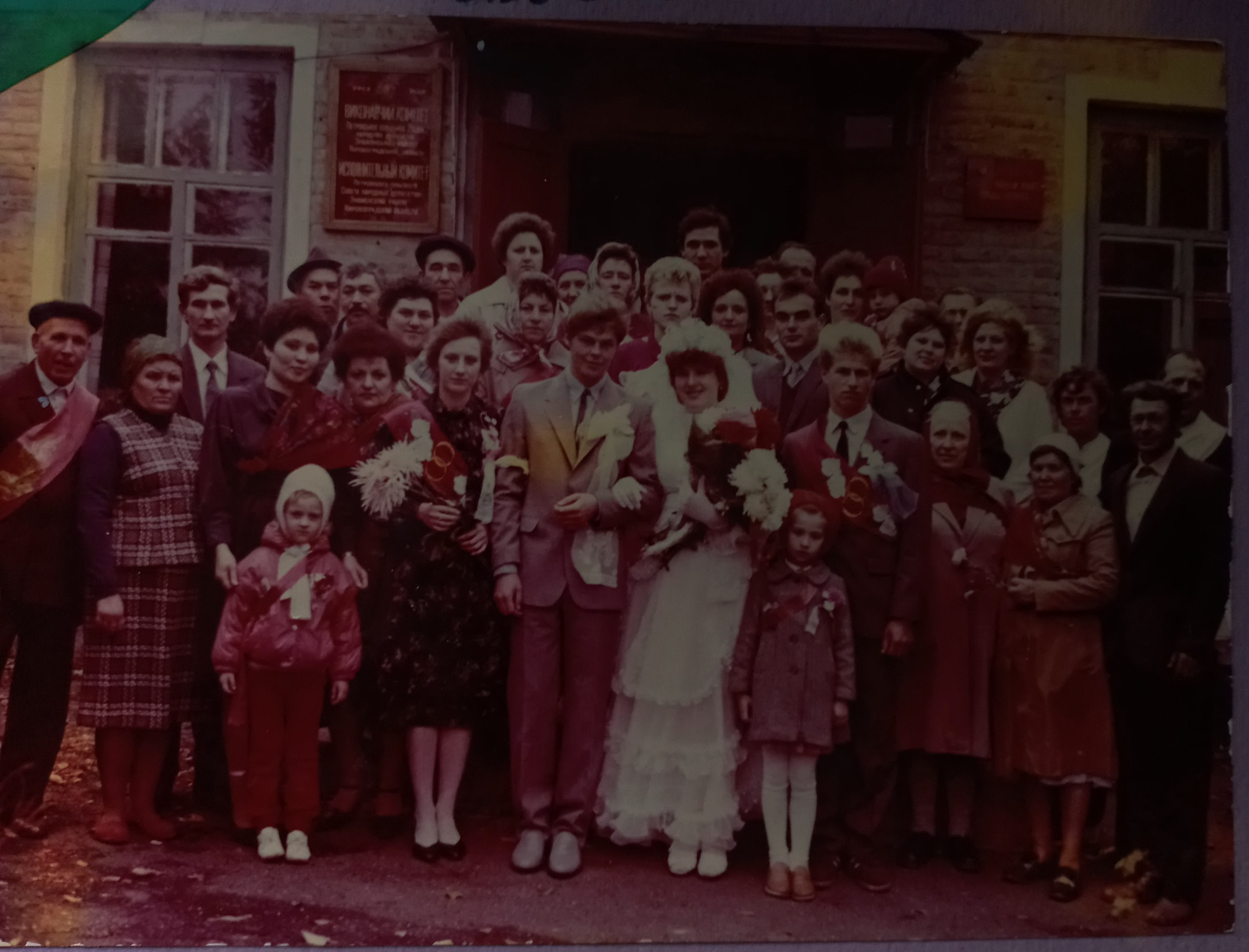
Wedding of Viktor Kalyuzhnyi in 1988 was a famous and big event in the village

Local residents also worked at the Znamianka radio factory "Acoustika" from 1977, including the hero of Russo-Ukrainian war Viktor Kalyuzhny (28.01.1967-04.07.2024) which has been closed since 1992 due to irrelevance and outdated technologies. And as of 2021, the building was almost demolished.
