= Znamianka, Kirovohrad Oblast =

City in Kirovohrad Oblast, Ukraine

Znamianka Знам'янка
- City
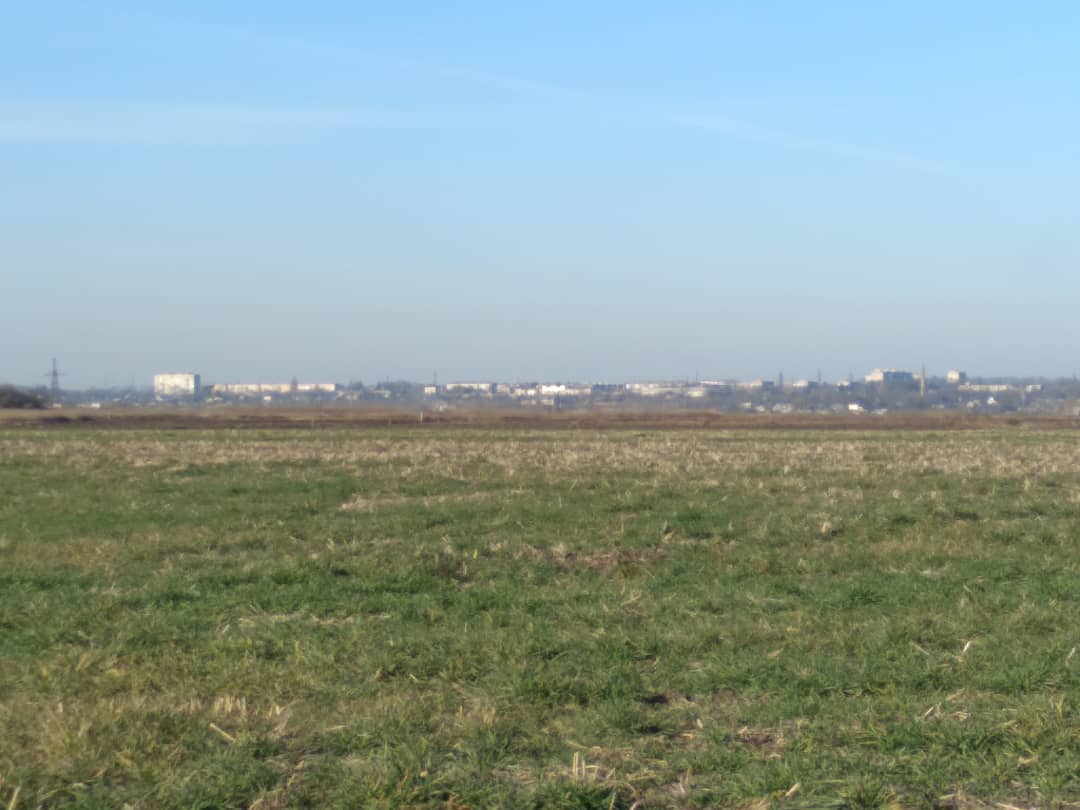
- Skyline of Znamianka from the south

- Flag Coat of arms
- Interactive map of Znamianka
- Location of Znamianka Znamianka (Ukraine)
- Coordinates: 48°42′49″N 32°40′24″E
- Country: Ukraine
- Oblast: Kirovohrad Oblast
- Raion: Kropyvnytskyi Raion
- Hromada: Znamianka urban hromada
- Founded: 1869

Area
  - Total: 14.8 km^{2} (5.7 sq mi)

Population (2022)
  - Total: 21,221
  - Density: 1,430/km^{2} (3,710/sq mi)
- Postal code: 27400
- Area code: +380 5233

Znamianka (Ukrainian: Знам'янка, IPA: [ˈznɑmjɐnkɐ]) is a city in central Ukraine, Kropyvnytskyi Raion, Kirovohrad Oblast. It hosts the administration of Znamianka urban hromada, one of the hromadas of Ukraine. Population: 21,221 (2022 estimate).

Znamianka is located about halfway between the regional center Kropyvnytskyi (west), and cities of Oleksandriia (east) and Svitlovodsk (north). It is an important railway junction on the routes Kyiv-Dnipro and Kharkiv-Odesa.

== History ==
The lands of the modern Kirovohrad Oblast and the Znamianka territorial hromada were first inhabited by Scythians, it was near the Znamianka that a bronze and golden image of the Scythian eagle was found, which is now a symbol of the region. In the course of excavations, many remains of the Chernoles culture were found here. In the Middle Ages, during the time of Kyivan Rus', the East Slavic tribe of Ulichis lived here.

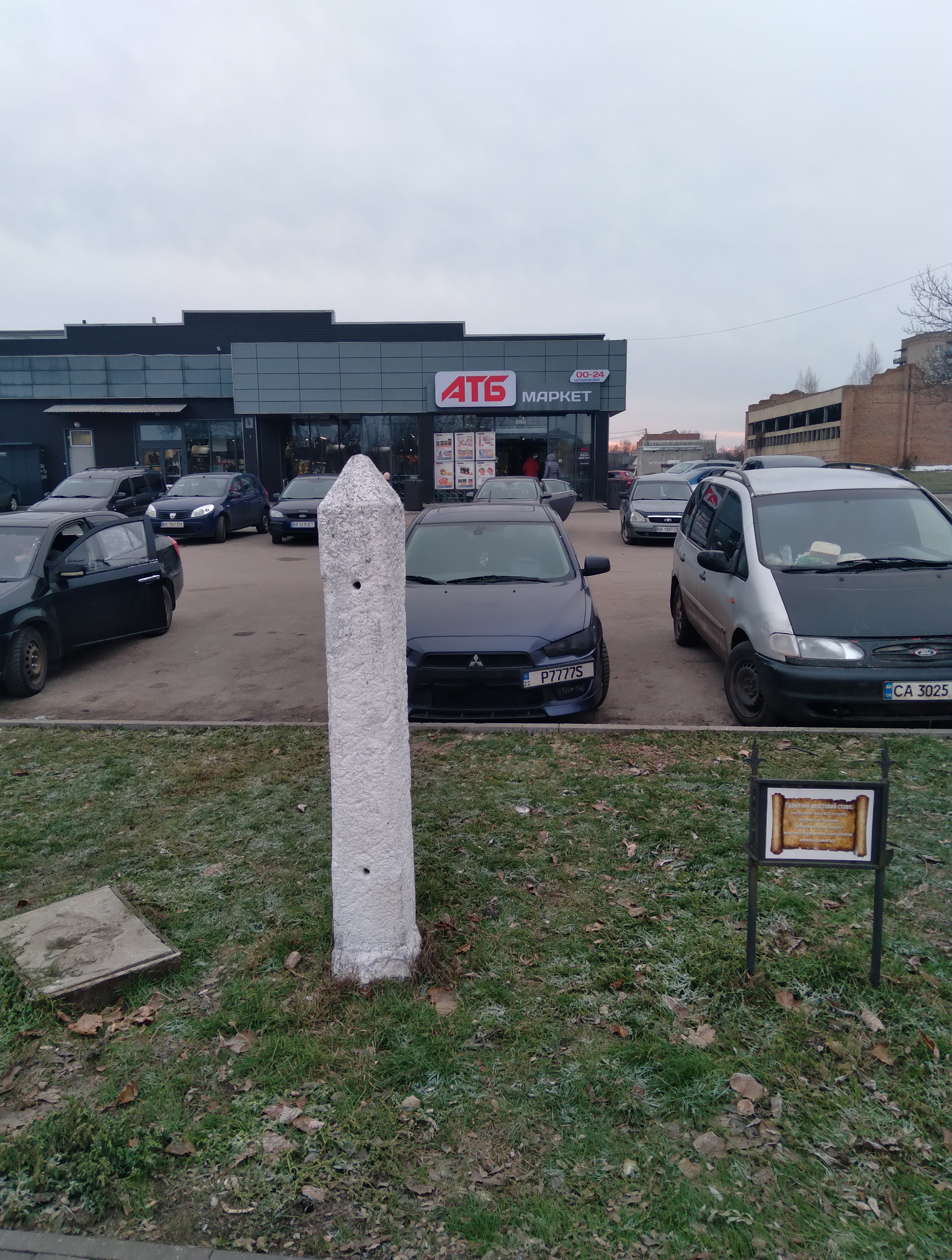
One of the unique granite columns with which Ukrainian Cossacks marked their territory, found in village of Moshoryne and installed opposite the ATB-Market in Znamianka

After the liberation of the former Kyivan Rus' from the Tatars in the Battle of Blue Waters and the unification of the principalities of Kyiv, Pereyaslav, and Chernihiv with the Grand Duchy of Lithuania, there was a need to protect the southeastern borders from attacks by the Crimean Khanate and Muscovy - states that were formed after the collapse of the Golden Horde at the end of the 15th century. For this, Dmytro Vyshnevetsky founded the first Zaporozhian Sich on the island of Khortytsia, thus the Ukrainian Cossacs appeared.

On the territory of the modern Kirovohrad region the Zaporozhians founded many villages near the territory of modern Znamianka, like Moshoryne and Subottsi. After the destruction of the Zaporizhzhya Cossacks by the Russians in 1775, the lands of central Ukraine came under the direct authority of Russian Empire

Znamianka was established in 1869 when there started train movement between Kharkiv and Odesa in area that historically was known as Black Forest (or Nigra Sylva). At the meadow of Black Forest, through which stretched a segment of Yelizavetgrad – Kriukov (west–east), there was built the train station main building and its offices. The station was named after the original village Znamianka that was located 3 km (1.9 miles) away and today is known as Znamianka Druha.

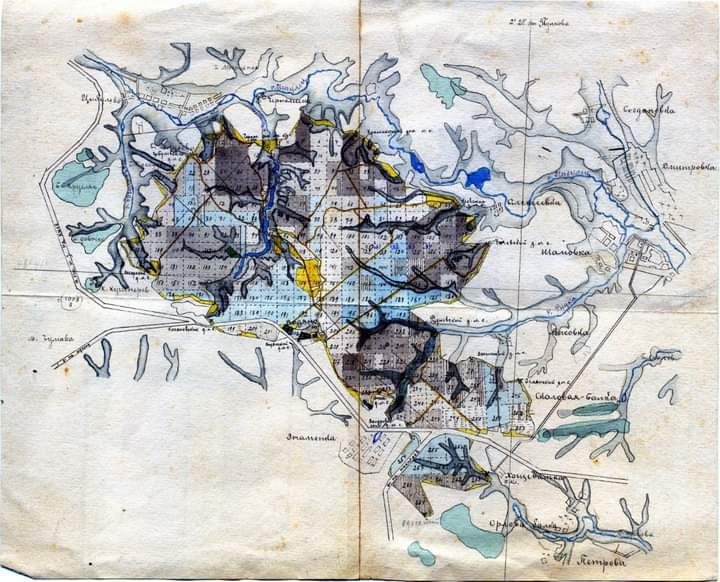
Znamianka, 19th-century map

To the area were resettled peasants from the Oryol Governorate area, possible the Russian Old Believers for whom the Our Lady of the Sign sacred. In Russian the Sign means Znamiennie, so in diminutive form the settlement's name became Znamianka.

Also there is another version of the origin of the name, according to which during the Russo-Turkish wars, the Ukrainian Cossacks, who were then under the protectorate of Russian Empire, before entering another battle with the turks, hid their jewels, in particular the flag, on one of the clearings of the Black Forest, later they died. According to this version, the name of the settlement appeared in honor of a reliably preserved flag (Ukrainian. знамено, znameno).

Historical populations
Year	Pop.	±%
1886	143	—
1913	6,000	+4095.8%
1926	9,100	+51.7%
1956	20,000	+119.8%
1989	33,828	+69.1%
2013	23,983	−29.1%
2022	21,221	−11.5%

In 1873 there was opened movement of trains on the segment Znamianka – Mykolaiv, in 1876 towards Fastiv. Out of a small train station Znamianka started to transform into a rail hub. Znamianka became a train station at four-way crossroads northeast towards Kremenchuk, south towards Mykolaiv, west towards Balta and northwest towards Fastiv. Simultaneously with building of the train station on a land lot that was rent out from landowners Osipovs by people from neighboring villages and other counties (uyezds), there appeared a small settlement of railway workers, Osypove.

In 1886 there already were 24 private houses, an earth shelter, six trading places and population of 143. Couple of dozens years later just south of the train station there appeared another settlement of Linitskoye.

=== 20th century ===
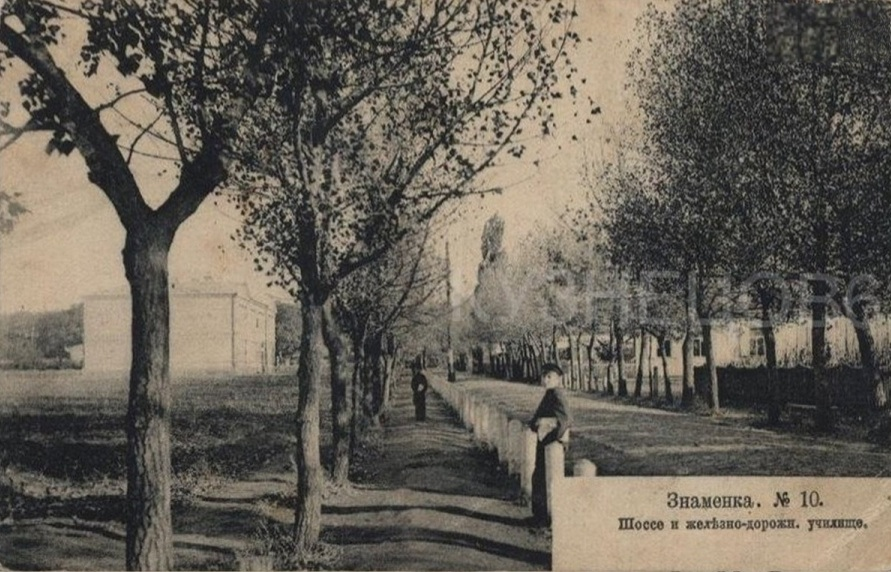
Central street (1915)

In 1913 in both Osypove and Linytske lived about 6,000 people. In the beginning for sometime the train station was classified of the third category with its locomotive depot accounting for 4 locomotives. In December 1883 when there ended construction of the new train station building, there were 29 locomotives and the depot employed some 92 workers. In the 1890s the rail hub was shipping out some 580,000 poods of bread annually.

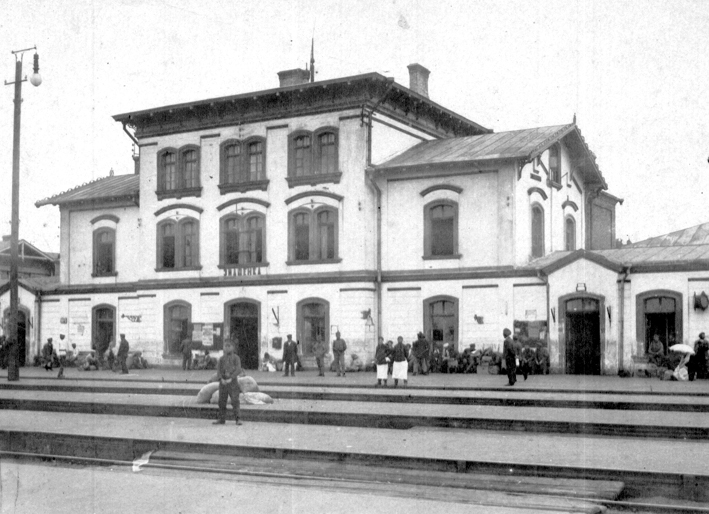
Old railway station in 1918 (destroyed by Soviet army during World War II)

During the 1917 to 1921 Ukrainian War of Independence and Ukrainian-Soviet war Znamianka was part of Ukrainian People's Republic, Ukrainian state, and the Kholodny Yar Republic. In February 1919 it was the site of a breakthrough of Bolshevik forces following the defection of Ukrainian otaman Nykyfor Hryhoriv. In 1920 Znamianka was captured by the Soviet army for the third time. Also, the Republic of Black Forest (Ukrainian. Республіка Чорного лісу) existed here, subordinate to the Kholodny Yar Republic — the last a hotbed of the struggle for the independence of the Ukrainian People's Republic and resistance to Soviet expansion. Afterwards it was administratively part of the Kremenchuk Governorate of Ukraine, and after its dissolution of the Katerynoslav Governorate of Ukraine.

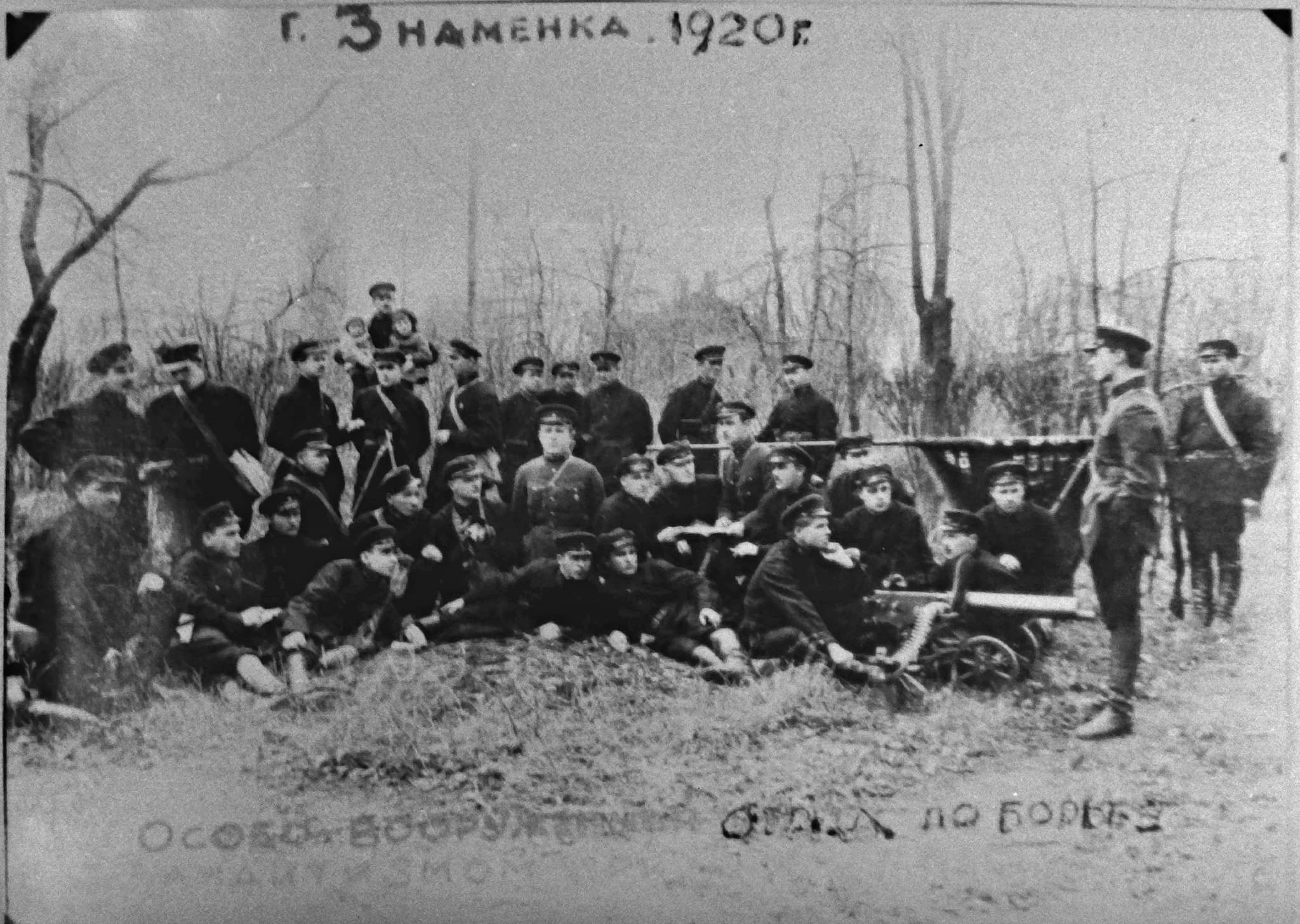
Red Army soldiers on the outskirts of Znamianka seek out and destroys rebels of the Black Forest Republic loyal to the Ukrainian People's Republic

In 1923 Znamianka became the district center, which was subordinated to 9 village councils. In 1930, Znamianka received the status of an urban-type settlement. During the Holodomor (1932-1933) and Soviet repressions, at least 891 residents died. According to eyewitnesses, in 1933, in the area of the old railway station, exhausted peasants who escaped from the collective farms and tried to leave for the cities fell out of the freight cars. They were hidden by equally hungry local residents near the station itself or on its outskirts. In 1938, Znamianka received the status of a city, with a population of 14,600 people.

During World War II Znamianka was under German occupation from August 5, 1941 to December 9, 1943. The Nazis shot 753 civilians, tortured 188 people, and forcibly transported 1,121 people to forced labor in Germany. In the spring of 1943, the Stalag 359 prisoner-of-war camp was relocated from Sandomierz in German-occupied Poland to Znamianka, and then in July 1943, it was further moved to Borysivka.

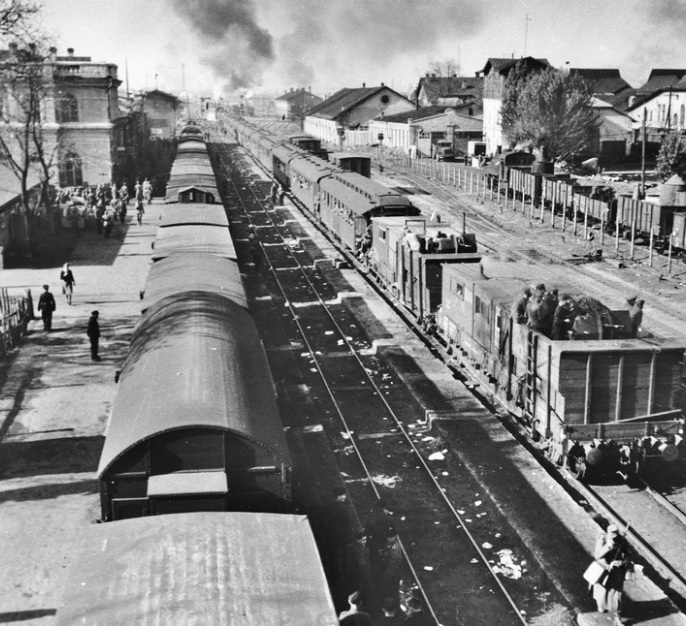
German trains in Znamianka (1942)

After the World War II, a new railway station was built in 1952, and five-story residential buildings in the 1960s. In 1968, the 14-meter Obelisk of Glory was installed in the city center, and in 1977, in front of it, the City Palace of Culture was opened. And in the 1980s, nine-story residential buildings were built. In January 1989 the population was 33 828 people.

=== Recent history ===
In 2012, based on the 2012 law "On the Principles of State Language Policy", Znamianka's city council declared Russian to be the city's regional language. On 28 February 2018 the Constitutional Court of Ukraine ruled this law unconstitutional.

In January 2013 the population was 23 983 people.

During the period of Anti-Terrorist Operation in the East of Ukraine (2014-2018) and the Operation of the United Forces (2018-2021), almost 1,000 citizens of Znamianka took part in combat operations. 12 died, a central street in the city was named after one of them (Viktor Holyi).

Until 18 July 2020, Znamianka was designated as a city of oblast significance and belonged to Znamianka Municipality but not to Znamianka Raion even though it was the center of the raion. Znamianka Municipality combined the city of Znamianka, the urban-type settlement of Znamianka Druha, and the four villages : Petrove, Vodiane, Sokilnyky and Novooleksandrivka. As part of the administrative reform of Ukraine, which reduced the number of raions of Kirovohrad Oblast to four, Znamianka Municipality was merged into Kropyvnytskyi Raion.

During the Russian invasion of Ukraine, Znamianka became a refuge for several thousand refugees from the southeast of the state. According to the city council, from 2022 to 2025, 110 soldiers from Znamianka died defending the sovereignty and territorial integrity of Ukraine.

== Geography ==
Znamianka is located in the southeastern part of Dnieper Upland. A popular reservoir in the city is a Balka Orlova river and it's numerous ponds.

=== Climate ===
Climate data for Znamianka (1991–2020)
Month	Jan	Feb	Mar	Apr	May	Jun	Jul	Aug	Sep	Oct	Nov	Dec	Year
Mean daily maximum °C (°F)	−1.3 (29.7)	0.2 (32.4)	6.2 (43.2)	15.5 (59.9)	21.8 (71.2)	25.4 (77.7)	27.7 (81.9)	27.3 (81.1)	21.2 (70.2)	13.5 (56.3)	5.4 (41.7)	0.3 (32.5)	13.6 (56.5)
Daily mean °C (°F)	−3.8 (25.2)	−2.9 (26.8)	2.0 (35.6)	9.7 (49.5)	15.6 (60.1)	19.5 (67.1)	21.4 (70.5)	20.7 (69.3)	15.0 (59.0)	8.5 (47.3)	2.3 (36.1)	−2.0 (28.4)	8.8 (47.8)
Mean daily minimum °C (°F)	−6.4 (20.5)	−5.7 (21.7)	−1.4 (29.5)	4.5 (40.1)	9.8 (49.6)	14.0 (57.2)	15.7 (60.3)	14.6 (58.3)	9.8 (49.6)	4.5 (40.1)	−0.3 (31.5)	−4.4 (24.1)	4.6 (40.3)
Average precipitation mm (inches)	40 (1.6)	32 (1.3)	39 (1.5)	33 (1.3)	55 (2.2)	79 (3.1)	69 (2.7)	48 (1.9)	55 (2.2)	43 (1.7)	39 (1.5)	37 (1.5)	569 (22.4)
Average precipitation days (≥ 1.0 mm)	8.0	6.6	7.9	6.3	7.7	8.0	6.5	5.2	6.1	5.7	6.2	7.1	81.3
Average relative humidity (%)	87.6	84.5	77.4	65.3	64.7	67.7	67.7	64.6	71.2	80.1	87.9	89.2	75.7
Mean monthly sunshine hours	51	75	137	201	280	302	324	304	216	141	53	39	2,123
Source: NOAA

== Gallery ==
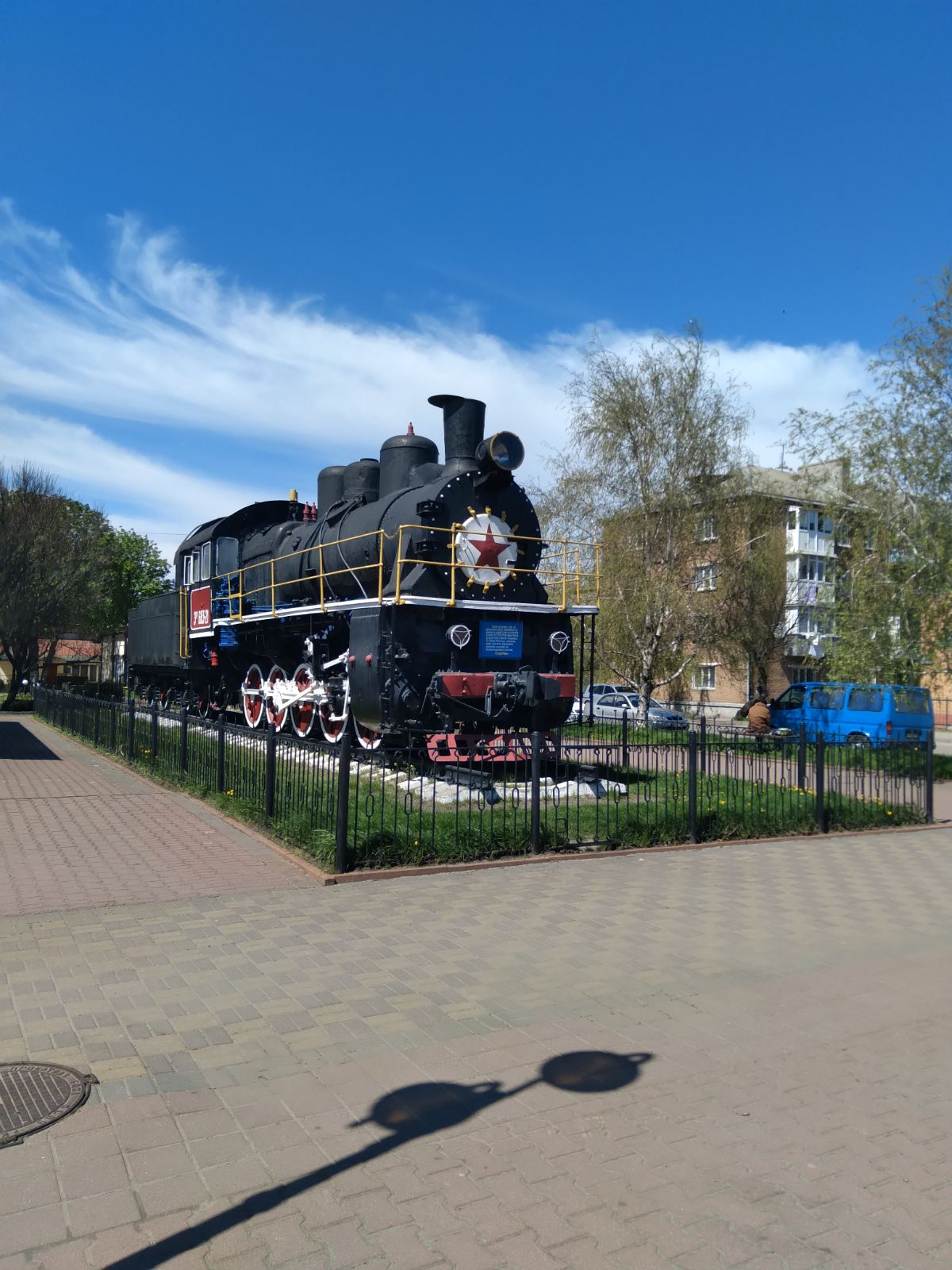
Locomotive memorial near the railway station

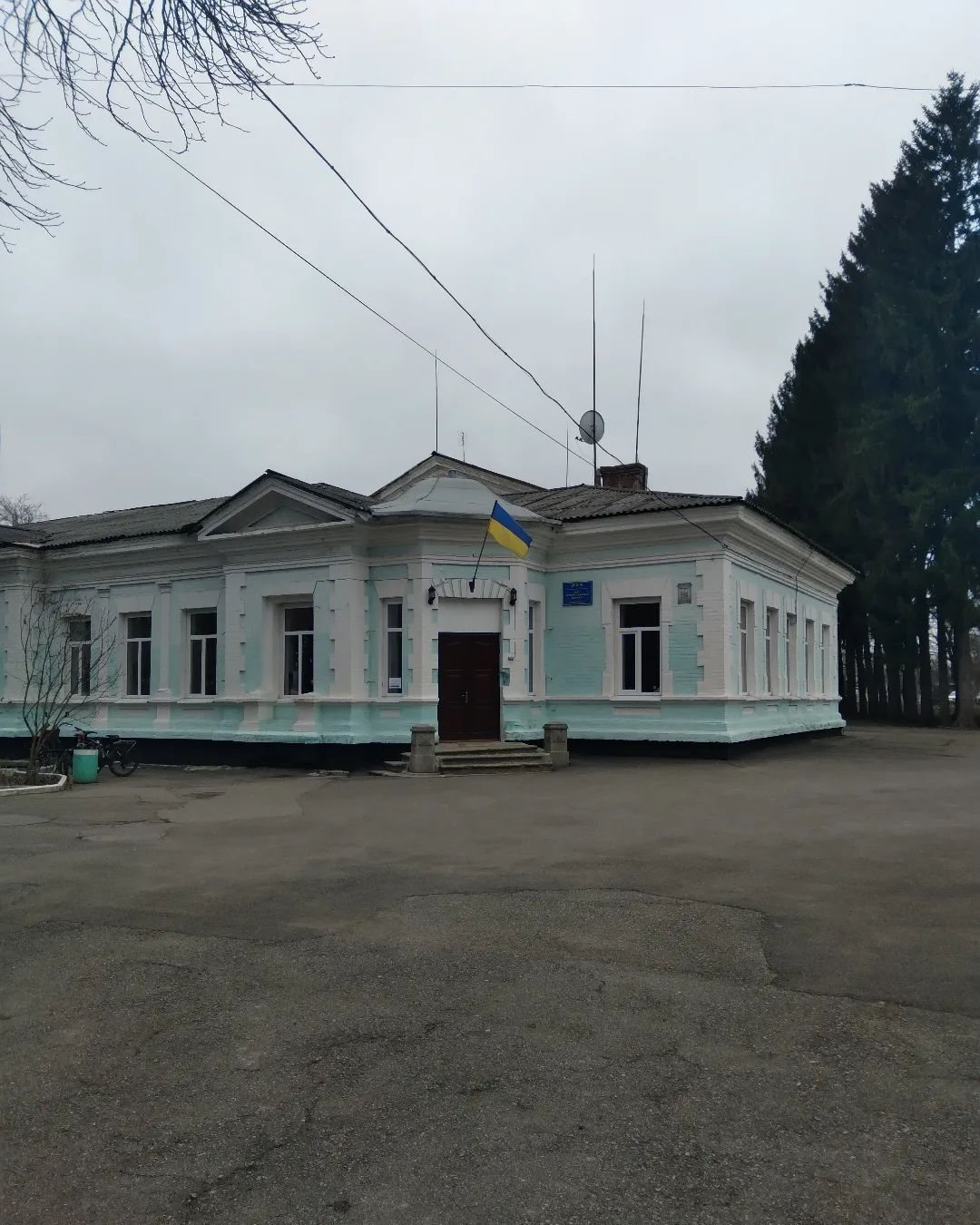
House of Mykola Lysenko, the oldest building in Znamianka

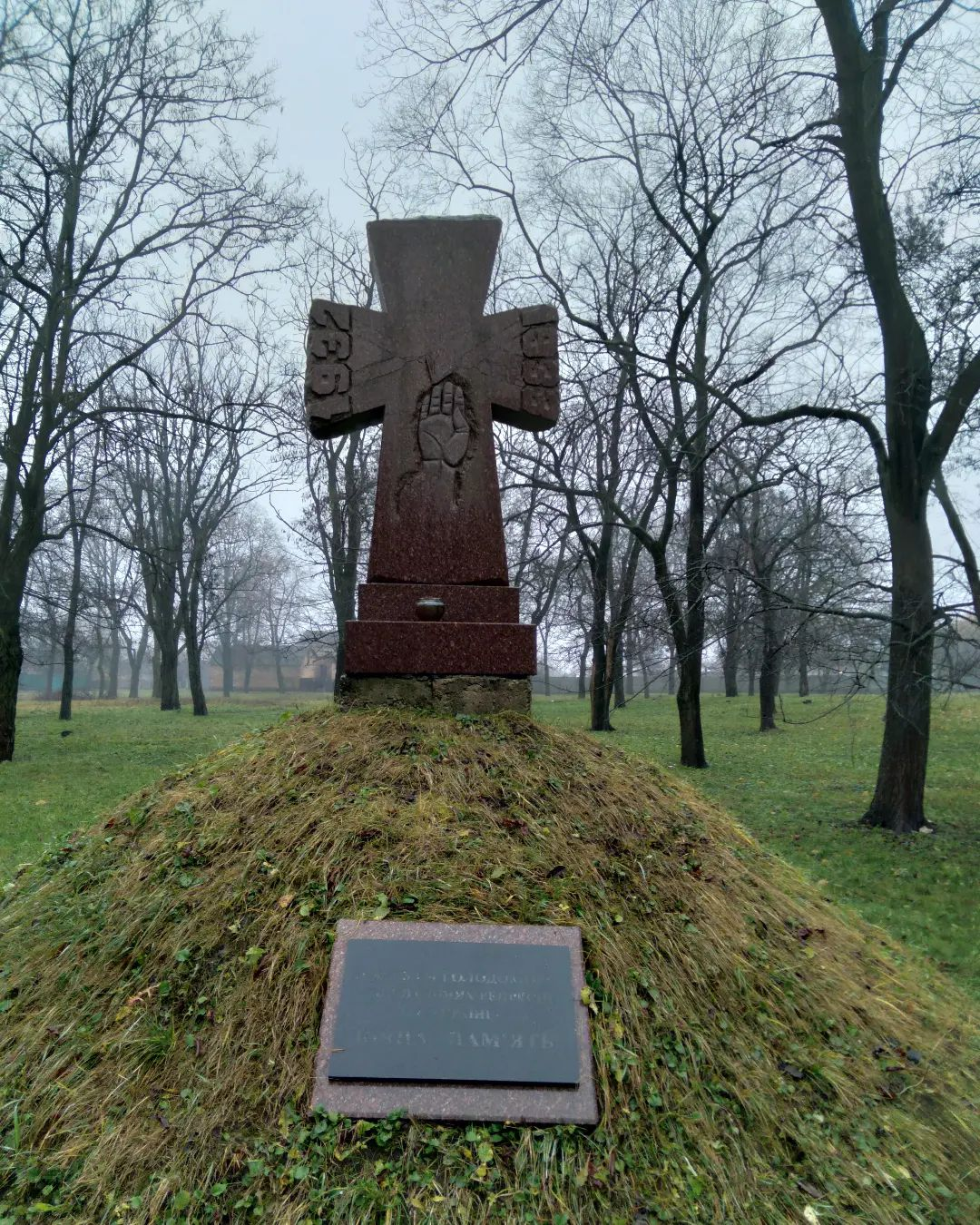
Memorial to victims of Holodomor and political repressions

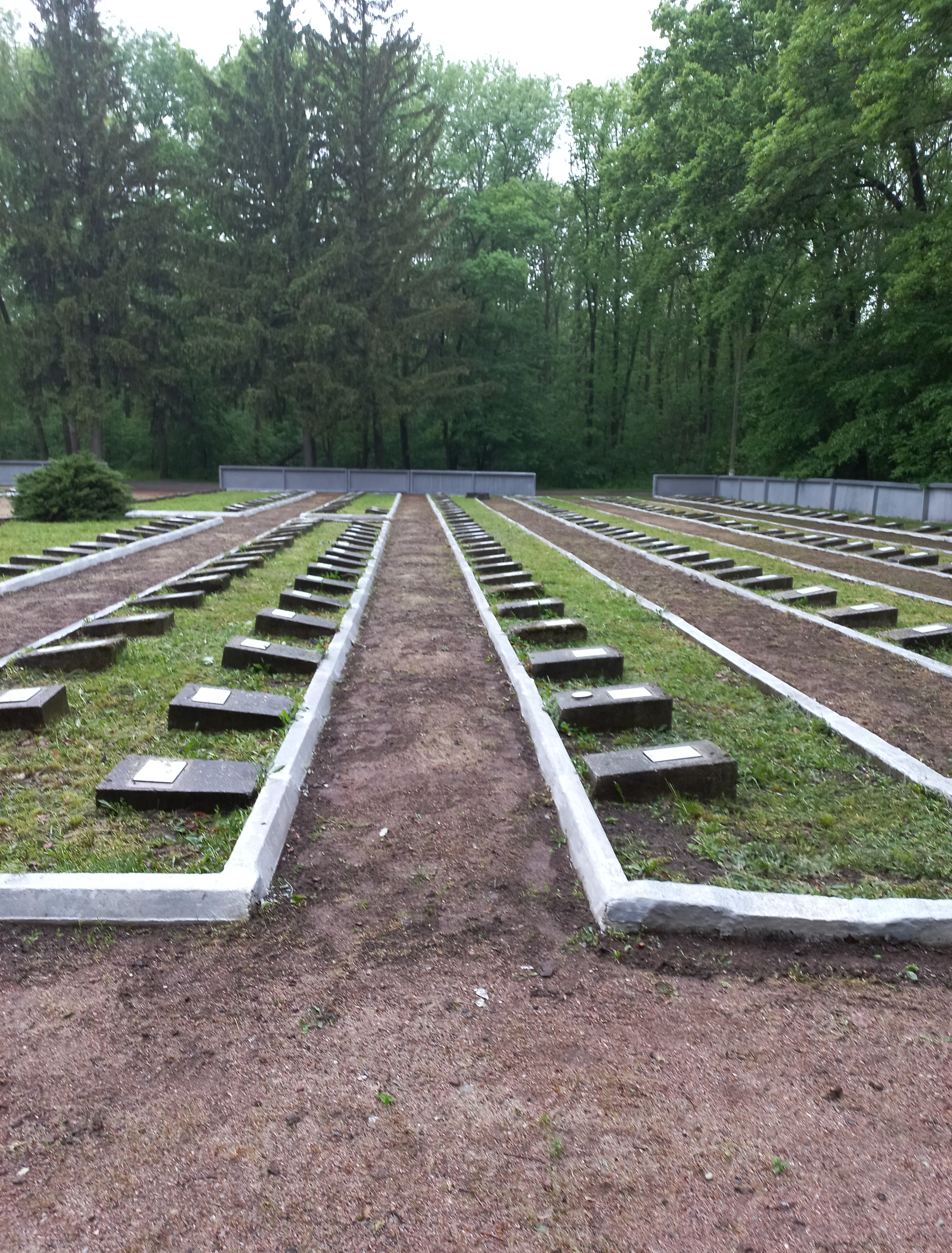
Cemetery dedicated to the soldiers of WW II

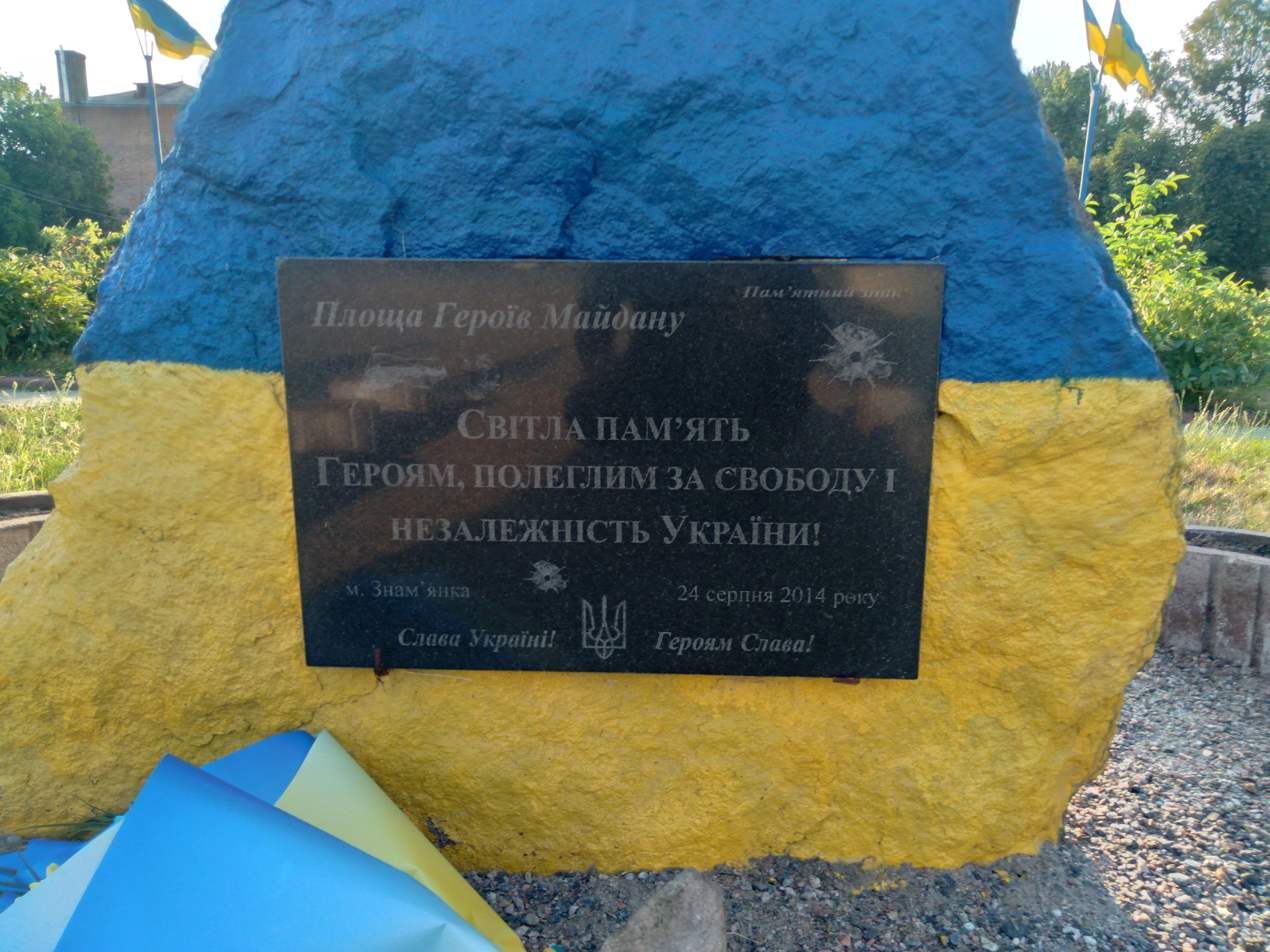
Monument to the events of Euromaidan

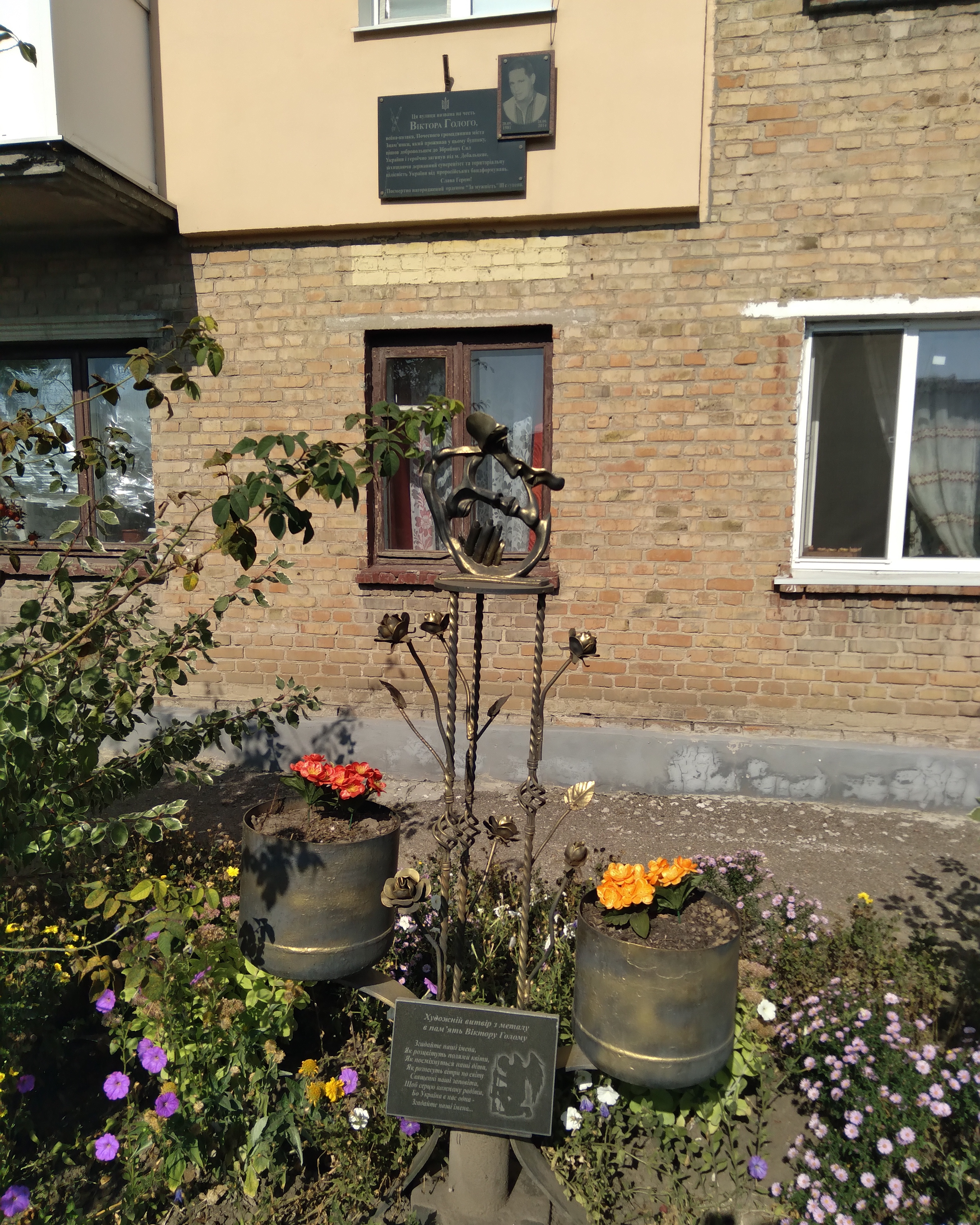
Memorial plaque to the first fallen hero of the Russo-Ukrainian war from Znamianka Viktor Holyi on the house where he lived

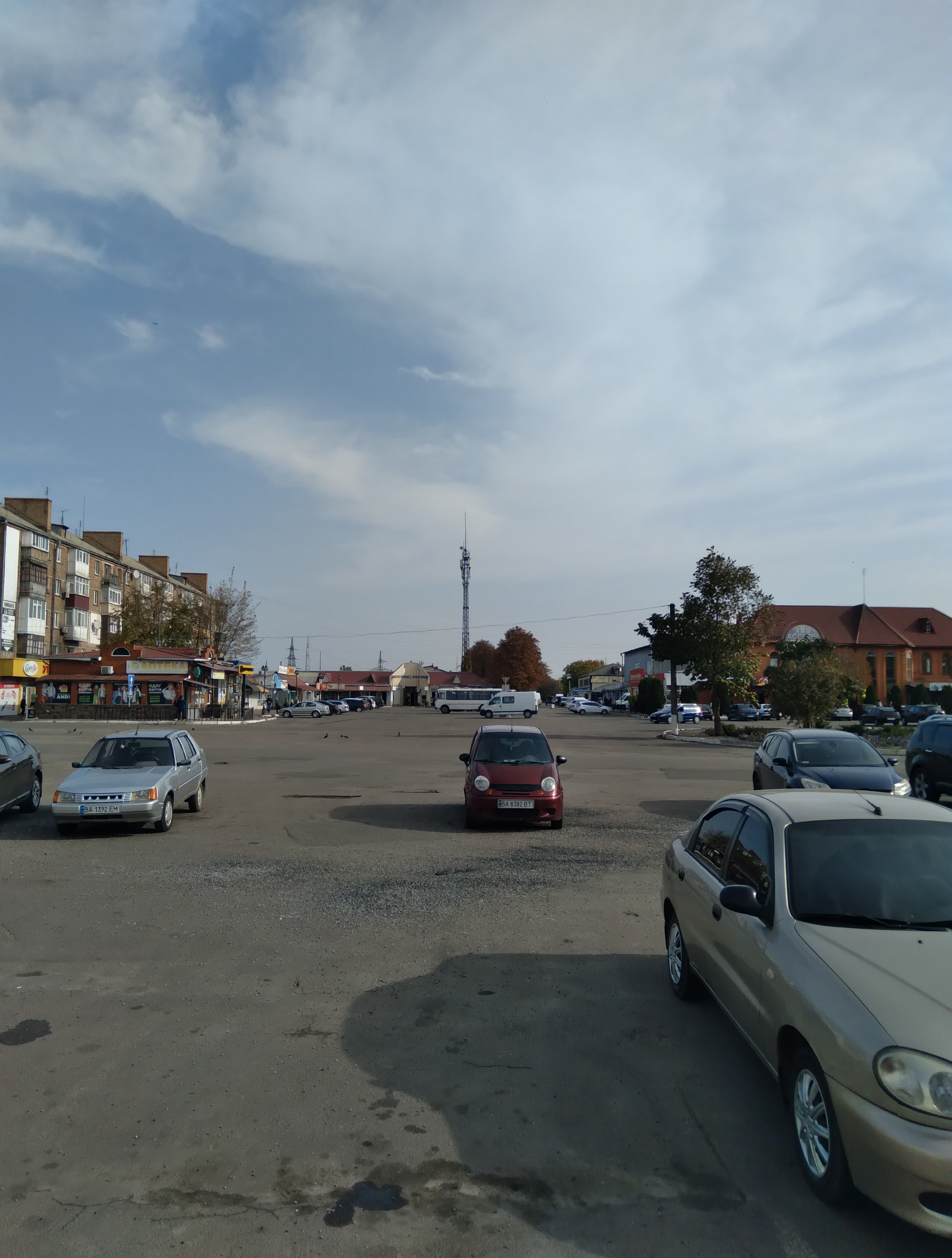
City bus station and the market

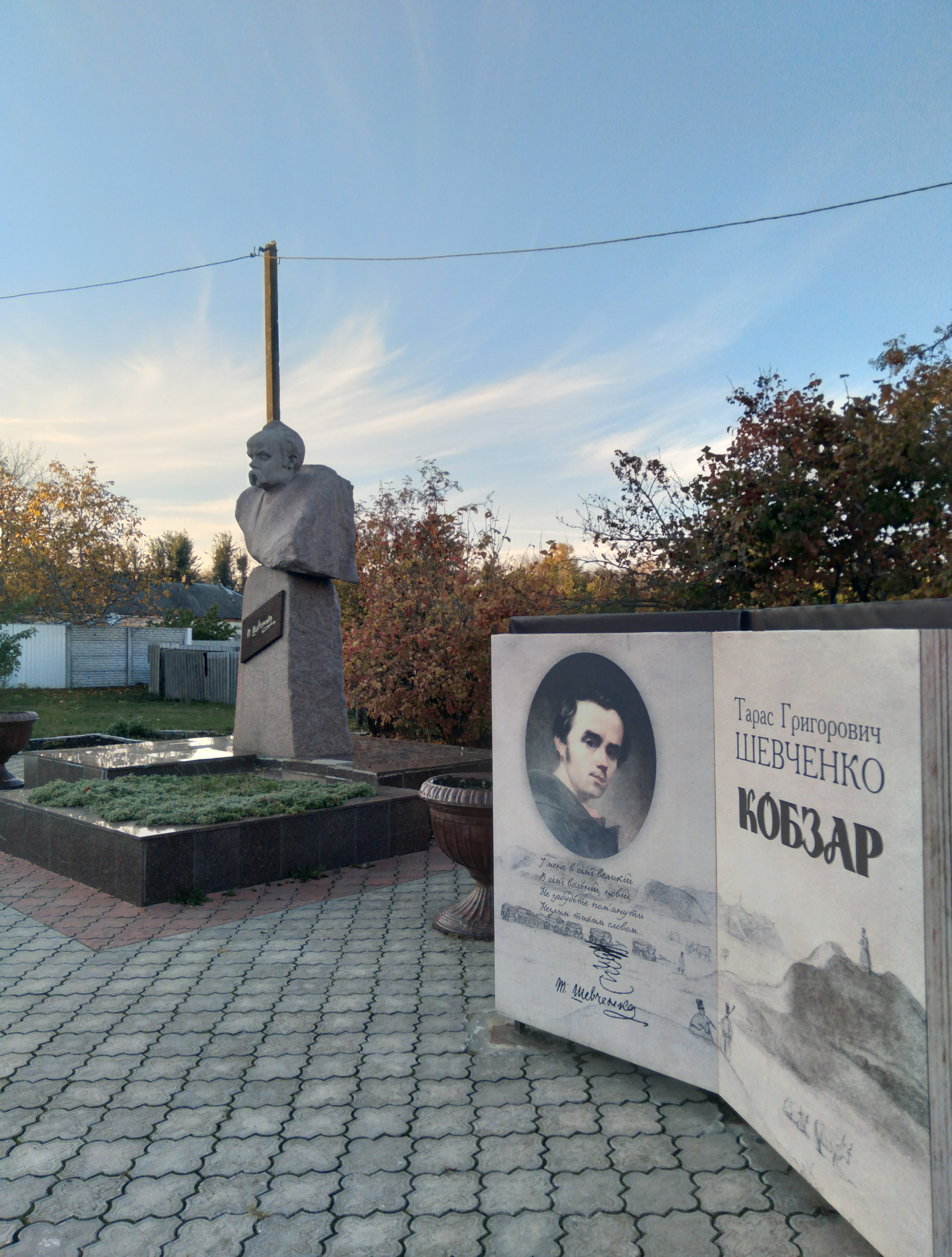
Monument to Taras Shevchenko

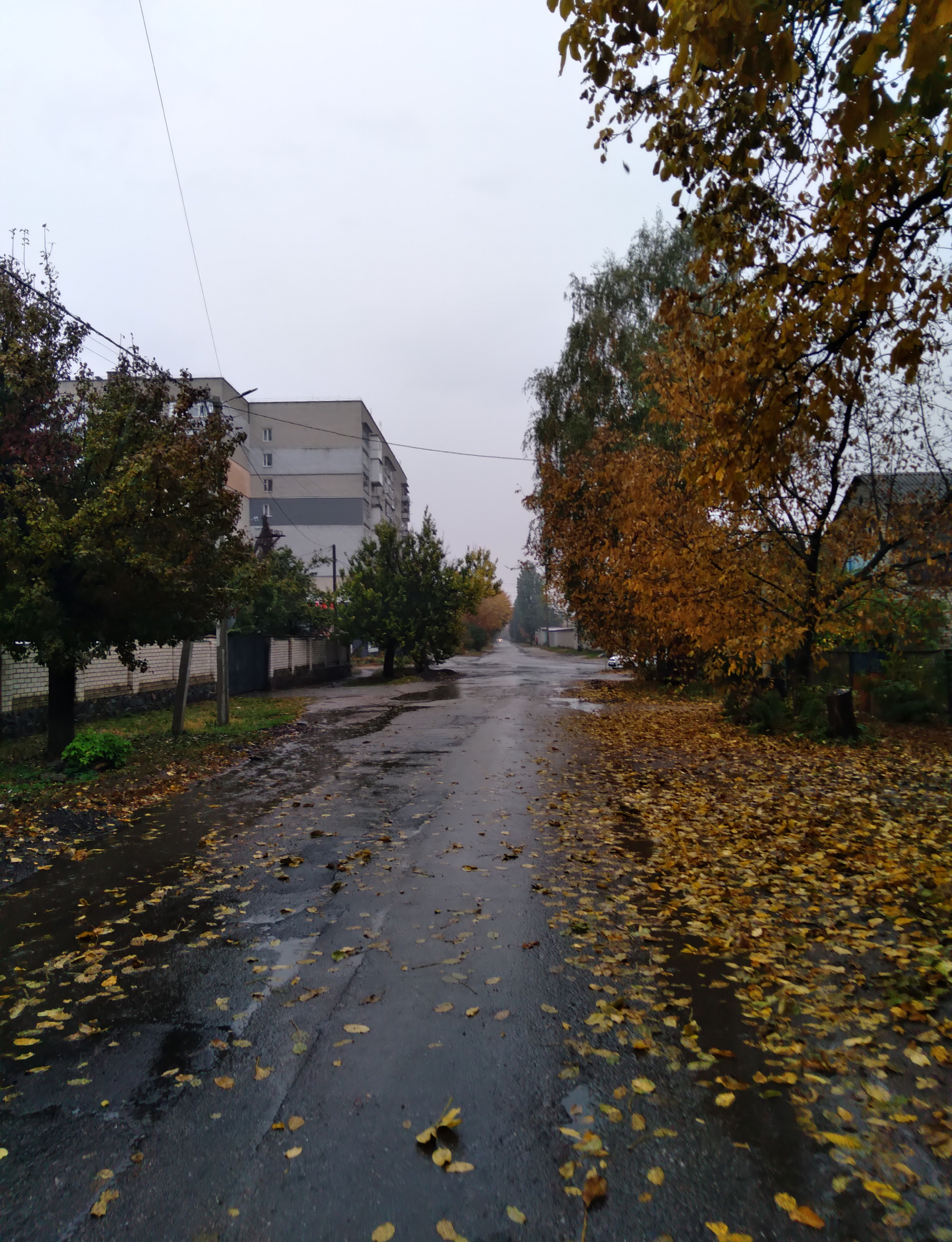
Kalynova street

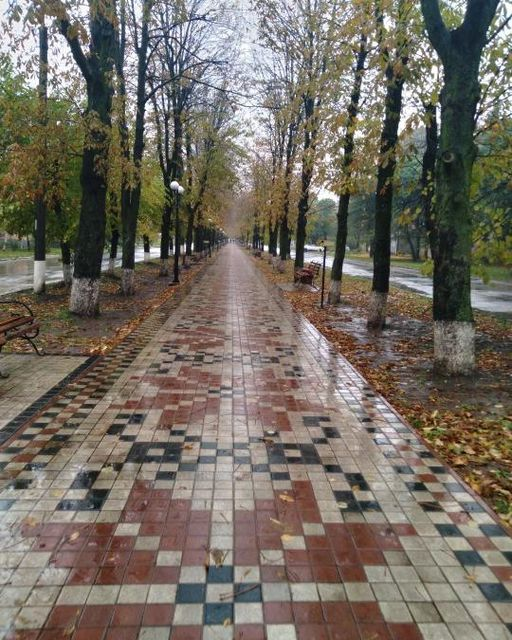
Alley in front of railway station

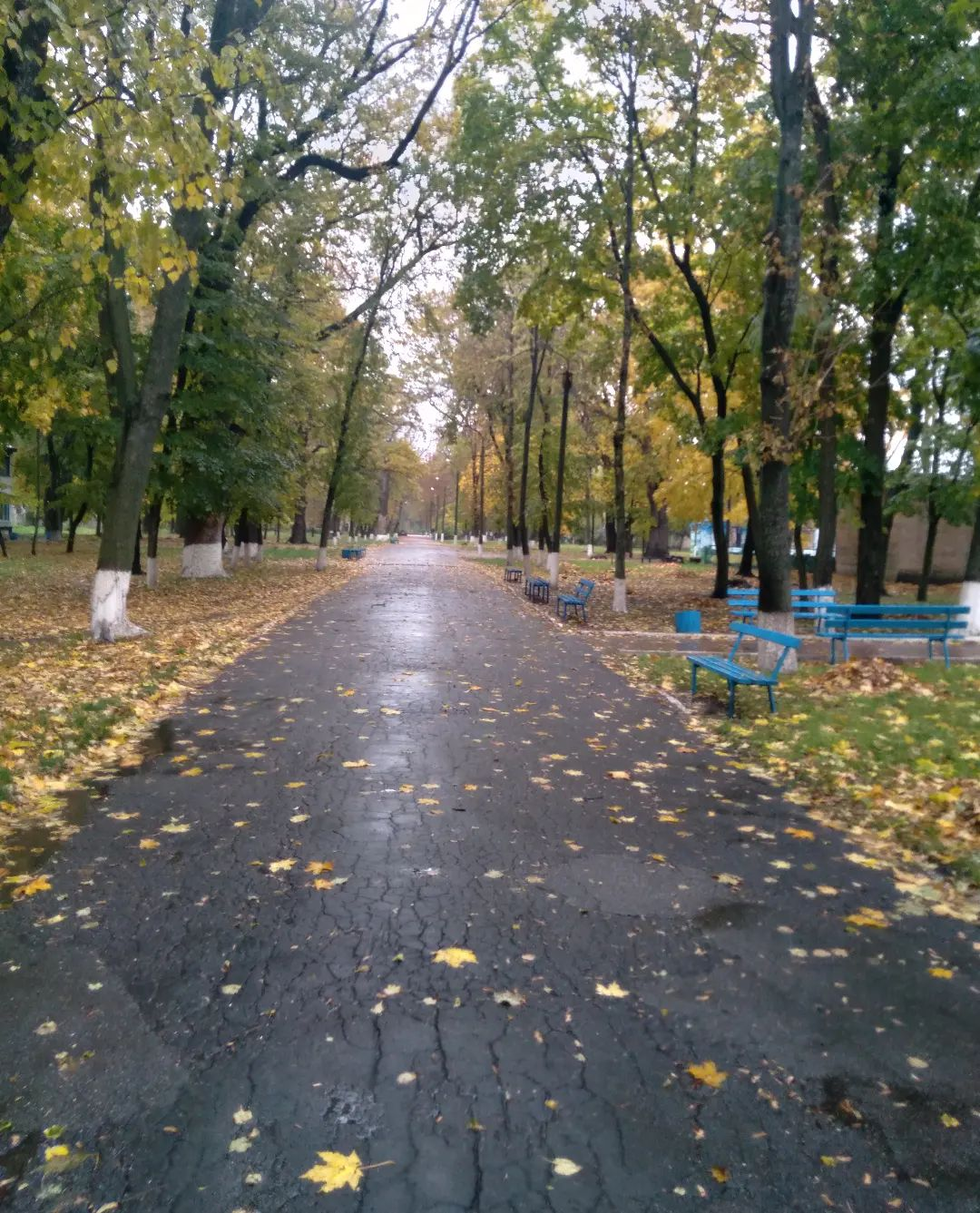
City park

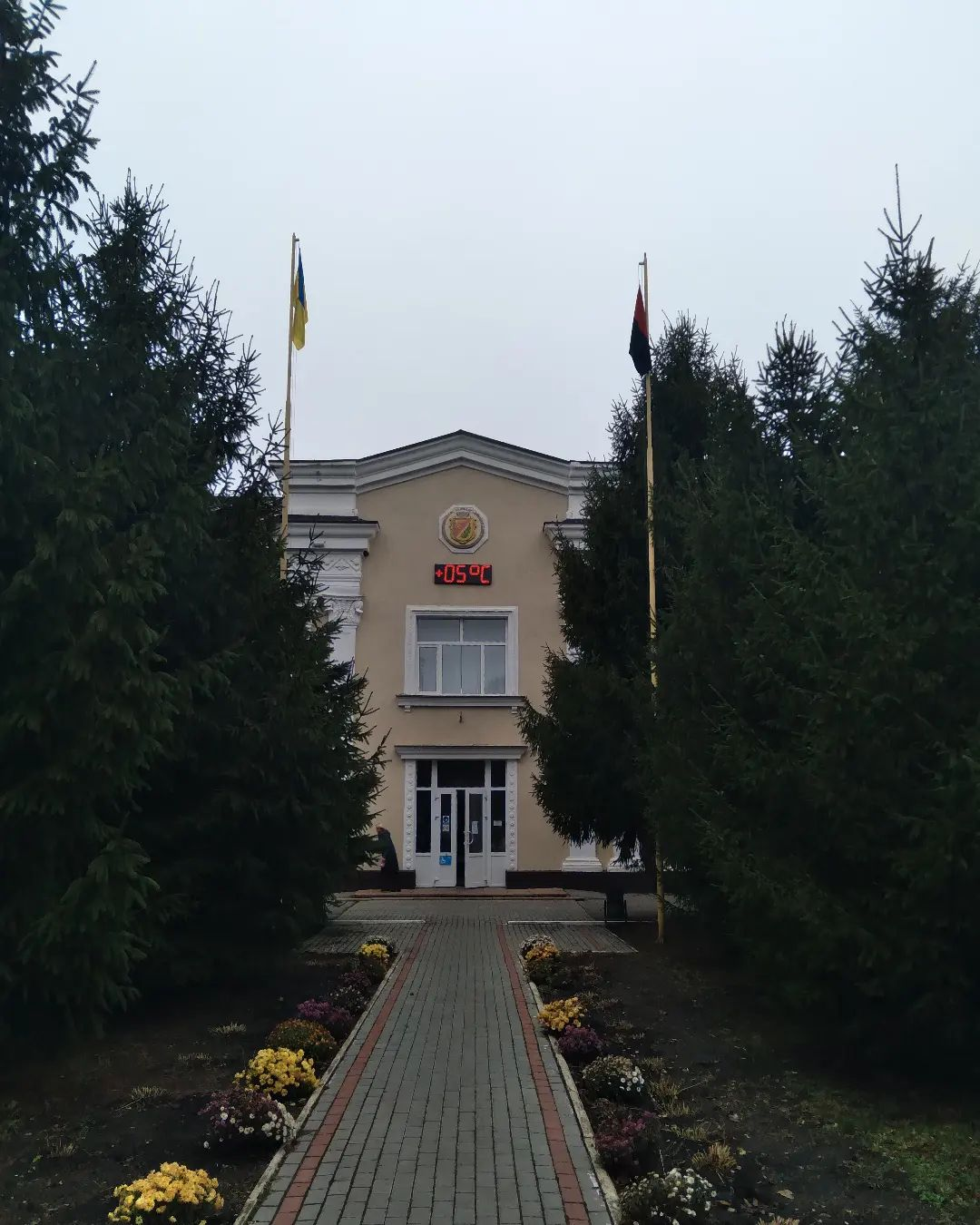
Znamianka City Council

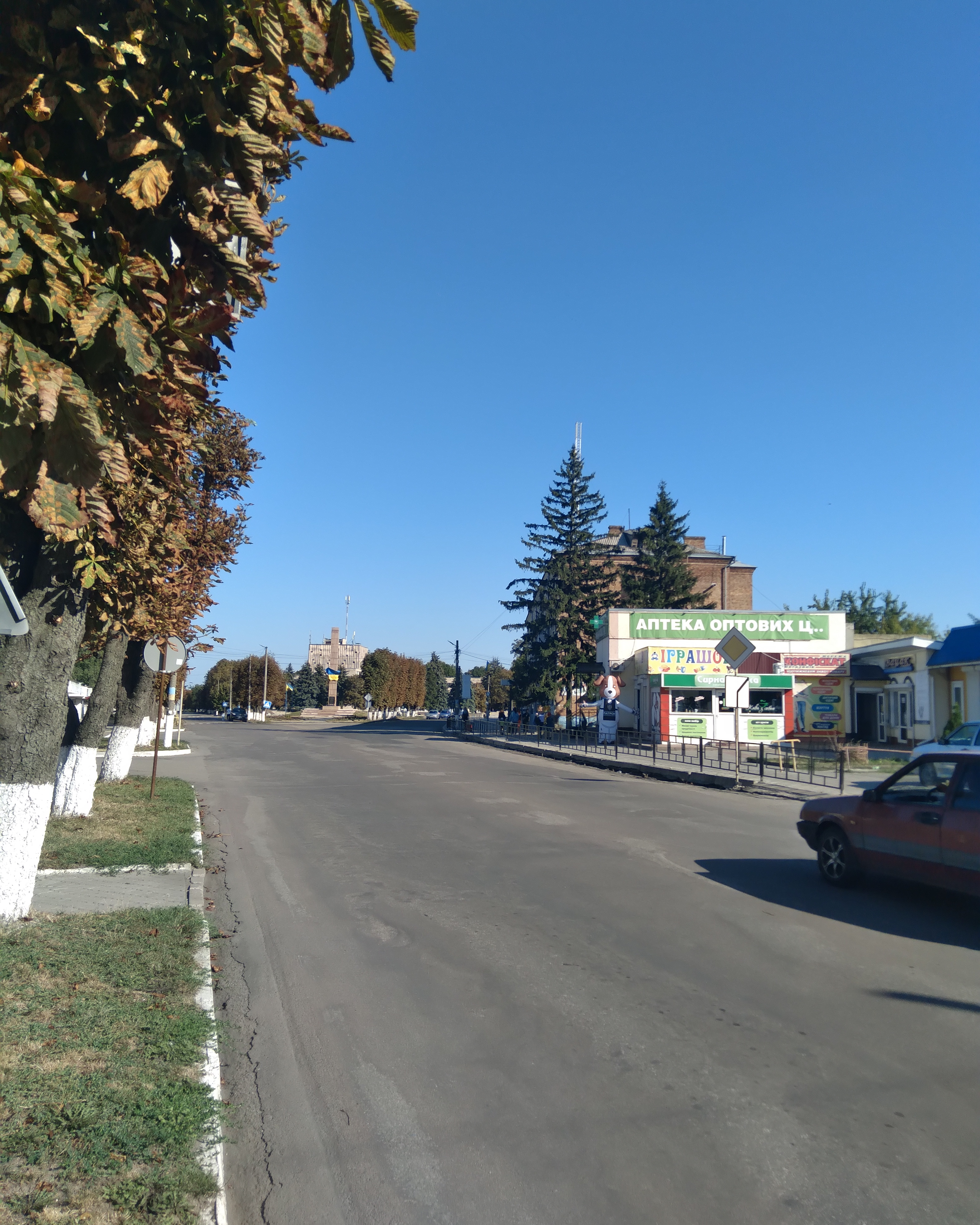
City center

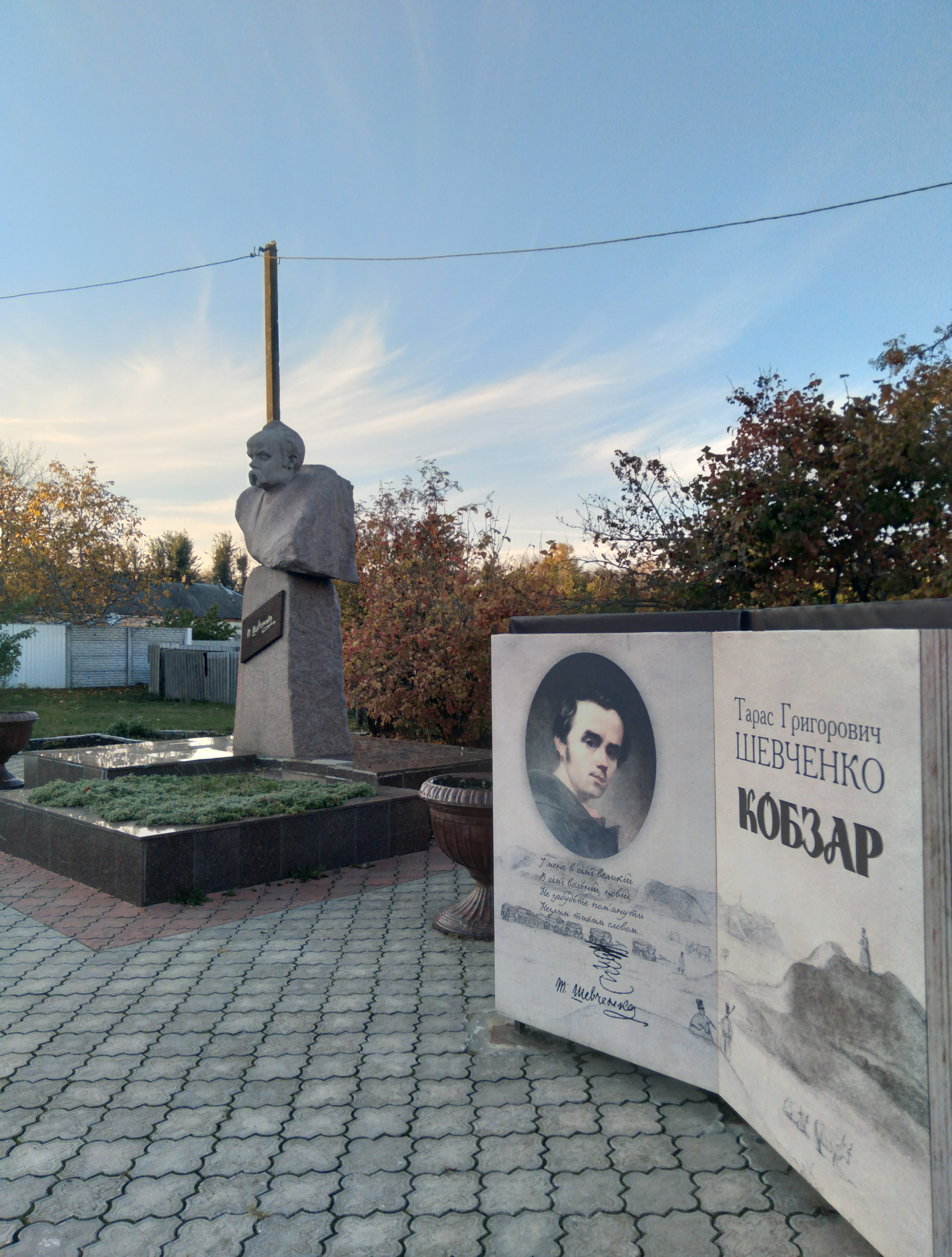
Monument to Taras Shevchenko

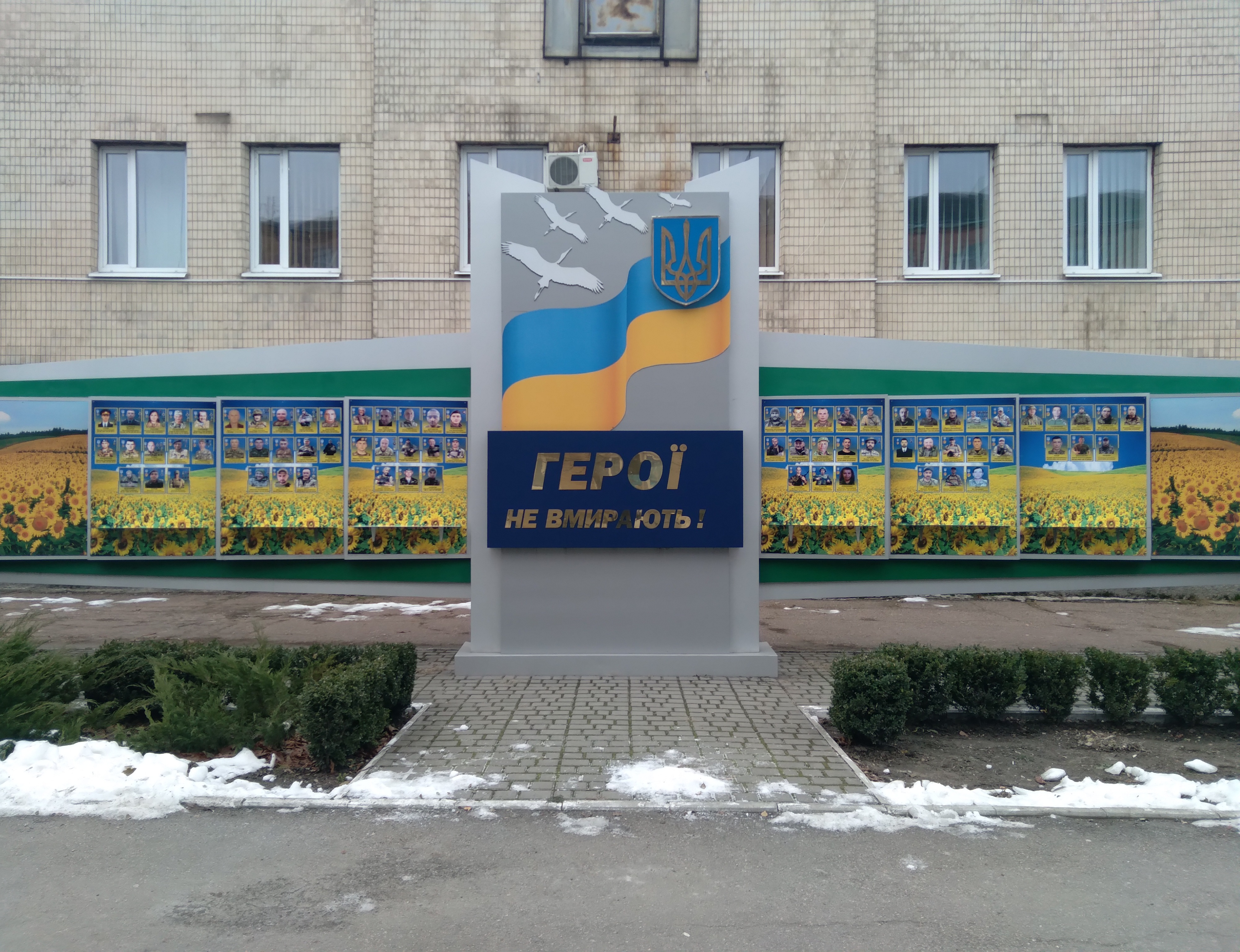
Mohument to the heroes of Russo-Ukrainian War

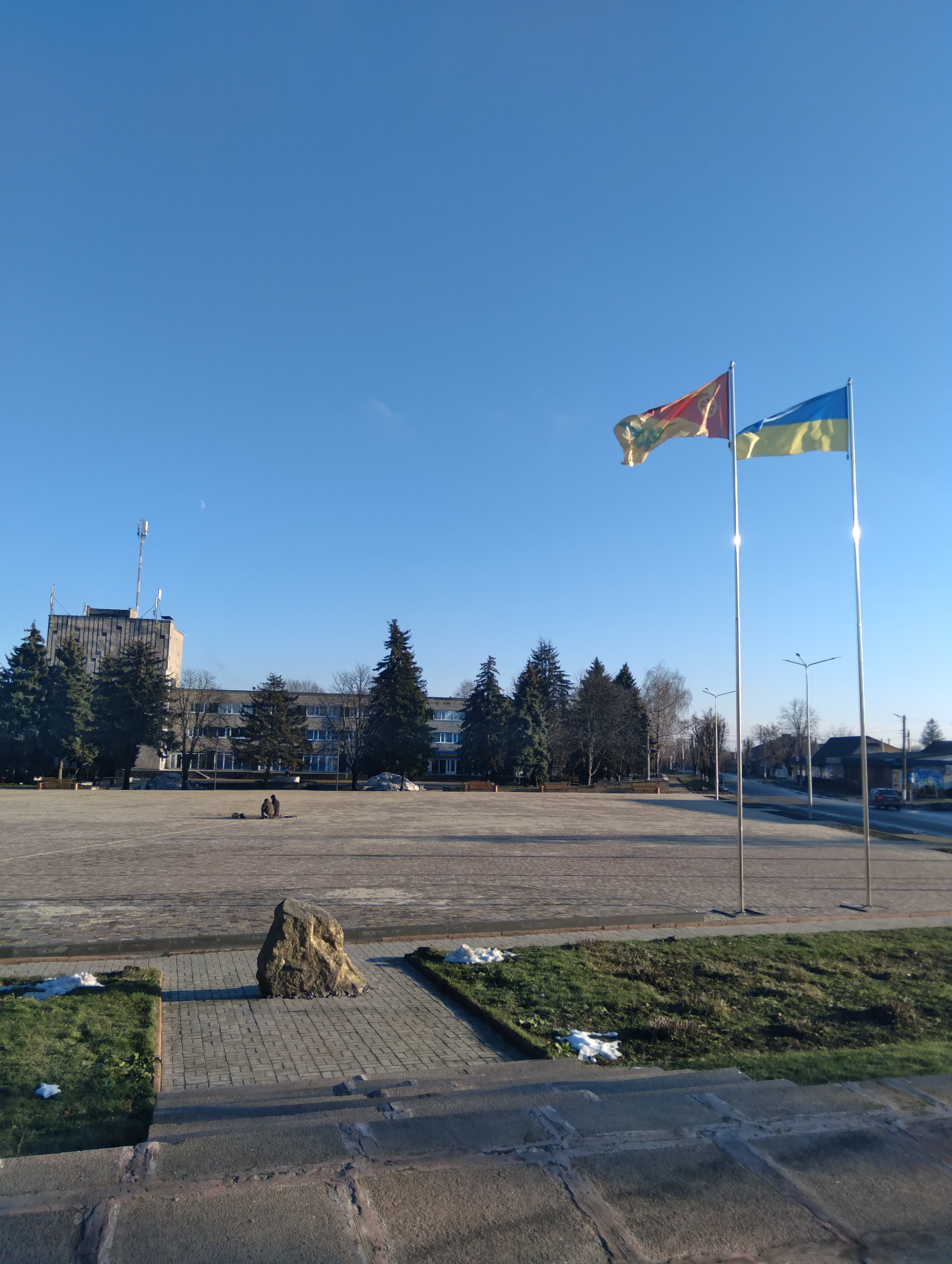
Central square
