= Novooleksandrivka, Znamianka urban hromada, Kropyvnytskyi Raion, Kirovohrad Oblast =

Village in Kirovohrad Oblast, Ukraine

Novooleksandrivka Новоолександрівка
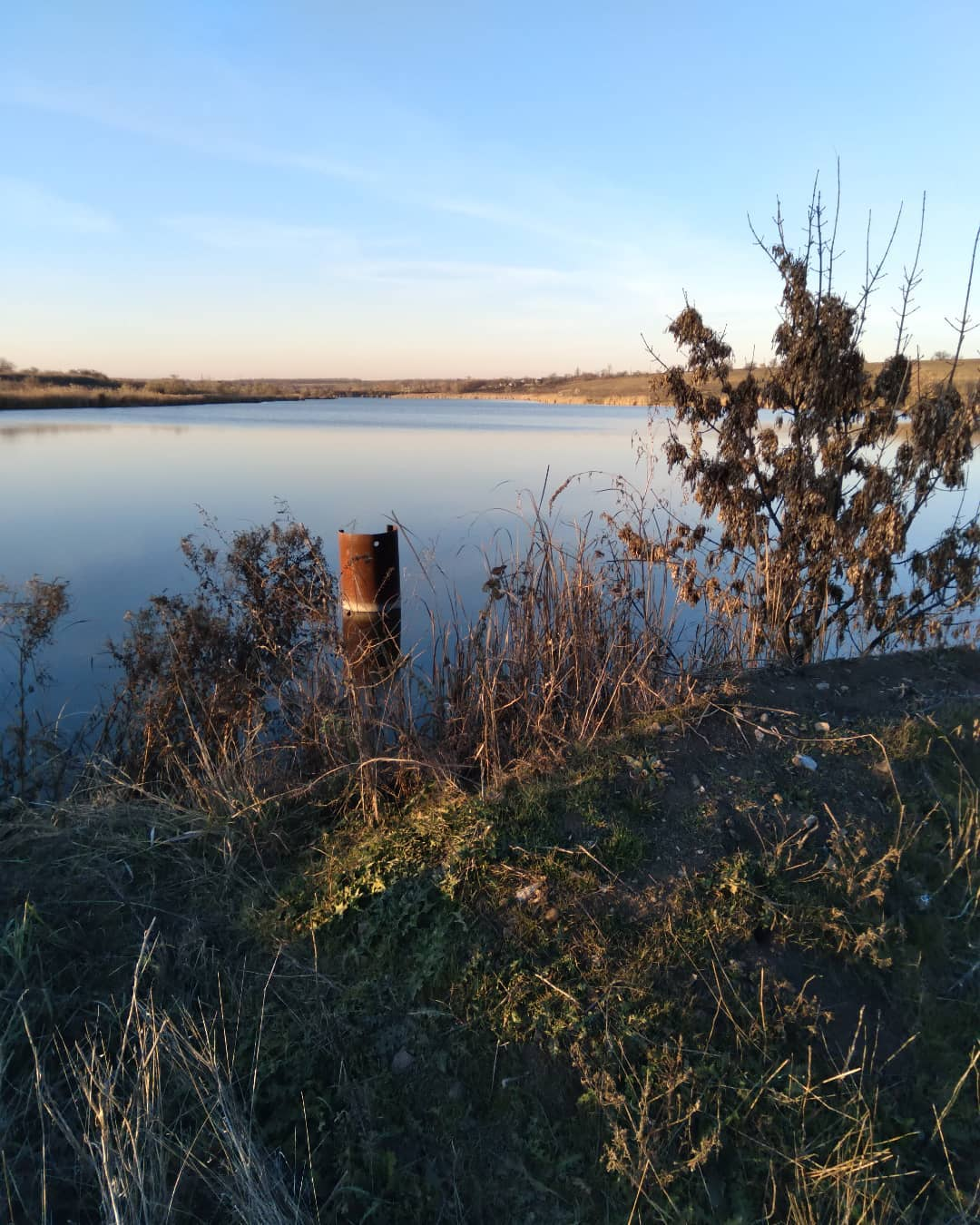

- Location within Ukraine Location within Ukraine Kirovohrad Oblast
- Coordinates: 48°42′49″N 32°40′24″E
- Country: Ukraine
- Oblast: Kirovohrad Oblast
- Raion: Kropyvnytskyi Raion
- Founded: 1875

Area
  - Total: 0,418 km^{2} (161 sq mi)

Population (2021)
  - Total: 2
  - Density: 0.0048/km^{2} (0.012/sq mi)
- Postal code: 27450

Novooleksandrivka (Ukrainian: Новоолександрівка) is a village in central Ukraine, Kropyvnytskyi Raion, Kirovohrad Oblast, in Znamianka urban hromada. It has a population of 2 (2021 est.). It is actually abandoned (ghost village).

== Geography ==
This village is located 10 km southeast of Znamianka, the river Balka Orlova flows through it.

== History ==
The village was founded as Deynehivka (Ukrainian. Дейнегівка) in honor of the nobleman Deyneg.

In the 1930s it was called Novooleksandrivka. During the Holodomor of 1932-1933, at least 43 villagers died.

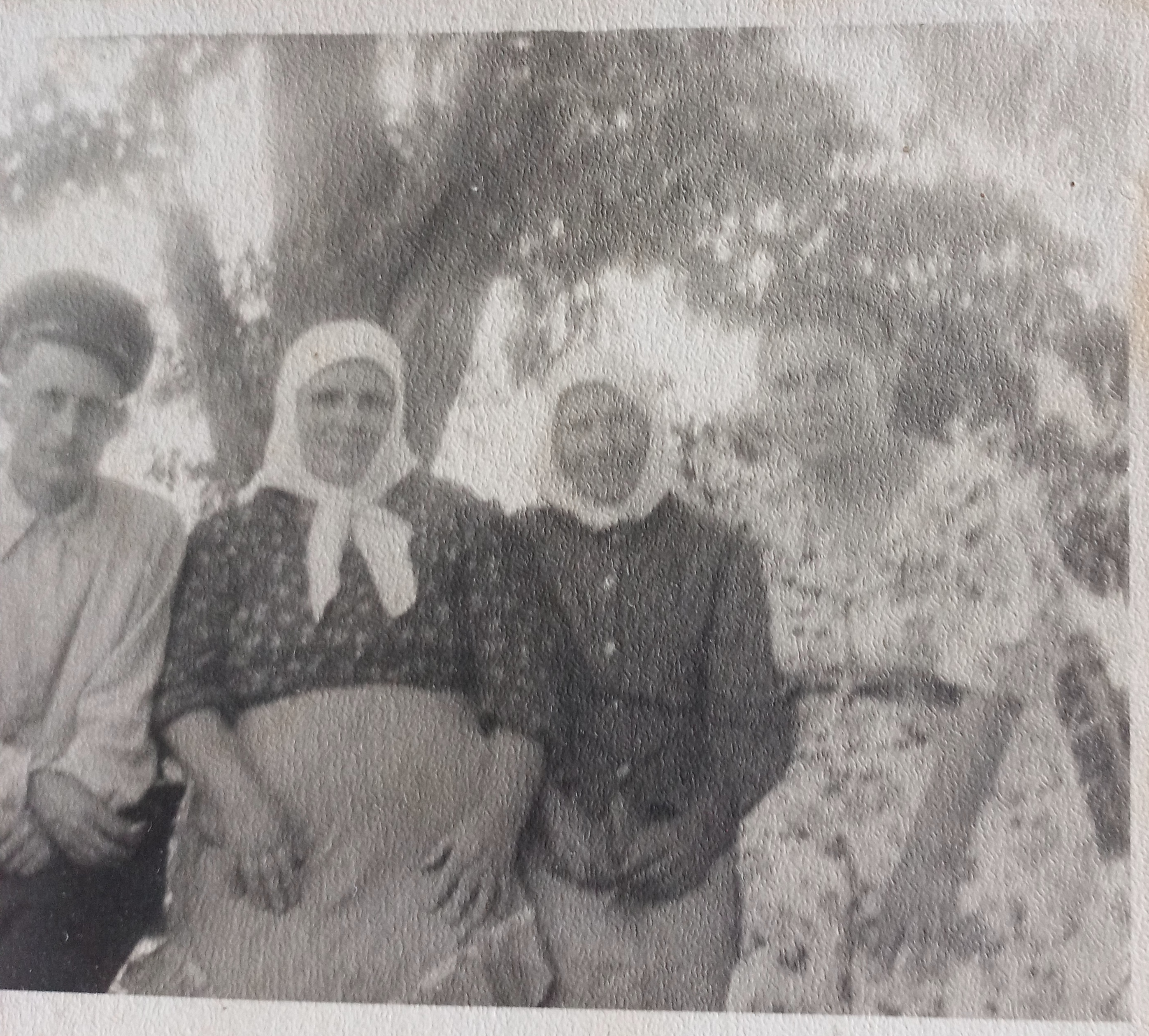
Lukiya Stachenko with her family, second from the right, 1955

During the German occupation, local resident Stachenko Lukiya Efymivna (1879-1973) baked bread for the partisans of the Black Forest.

In the 1960s, locals began to move en masse to Petrove. As of 2021, only 2 people lived here - Musiy Buldovych and Mykhailo Hryhorovych Mayboroda.

In the village was born Viktor Kalyuzhny (1967-2024) a hero of the Russo-Ukrainian war, went missing in the Donetsk oblast while holding back the advance, as a result of a Russian UAV attack on a position.

== Gallery ==
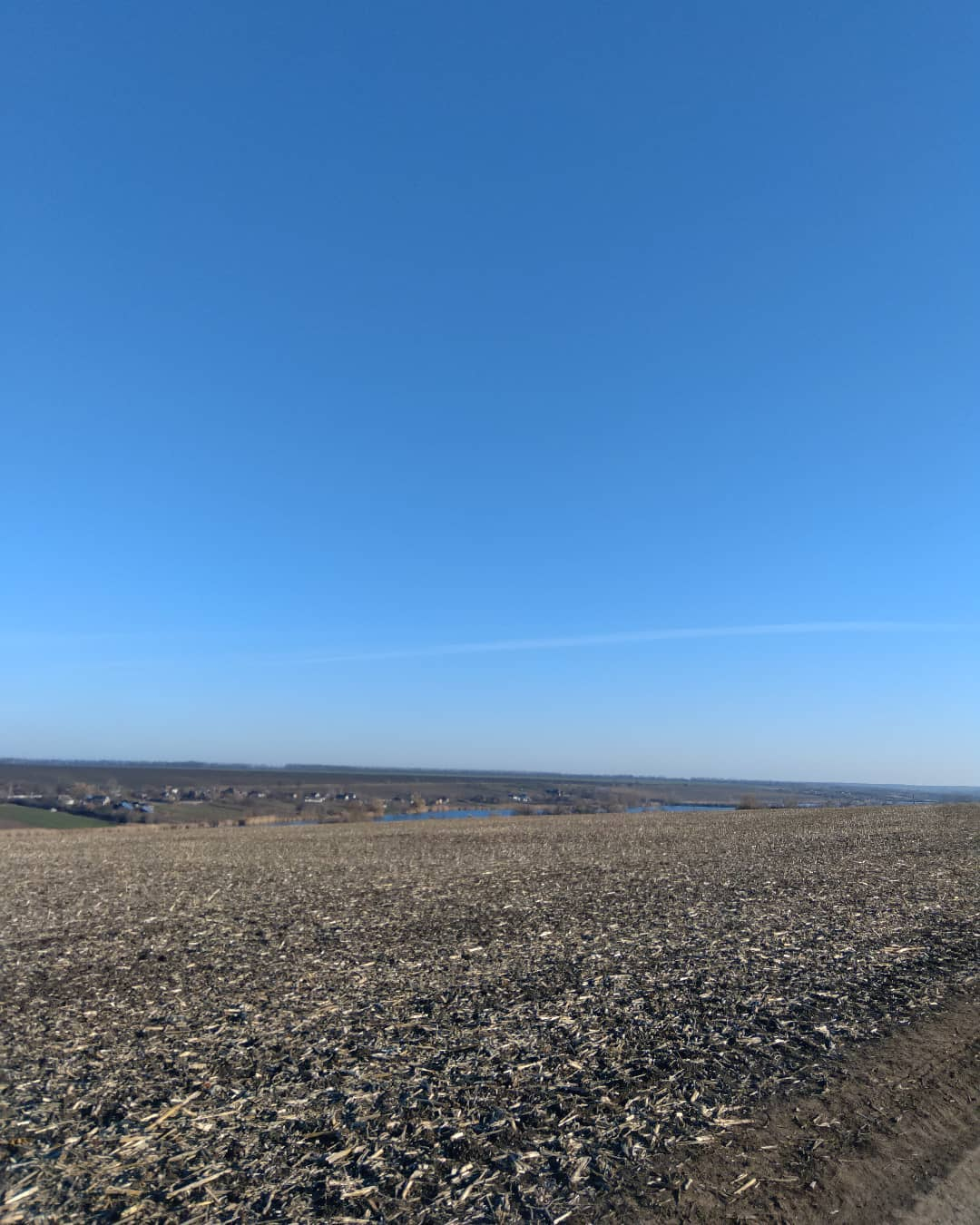

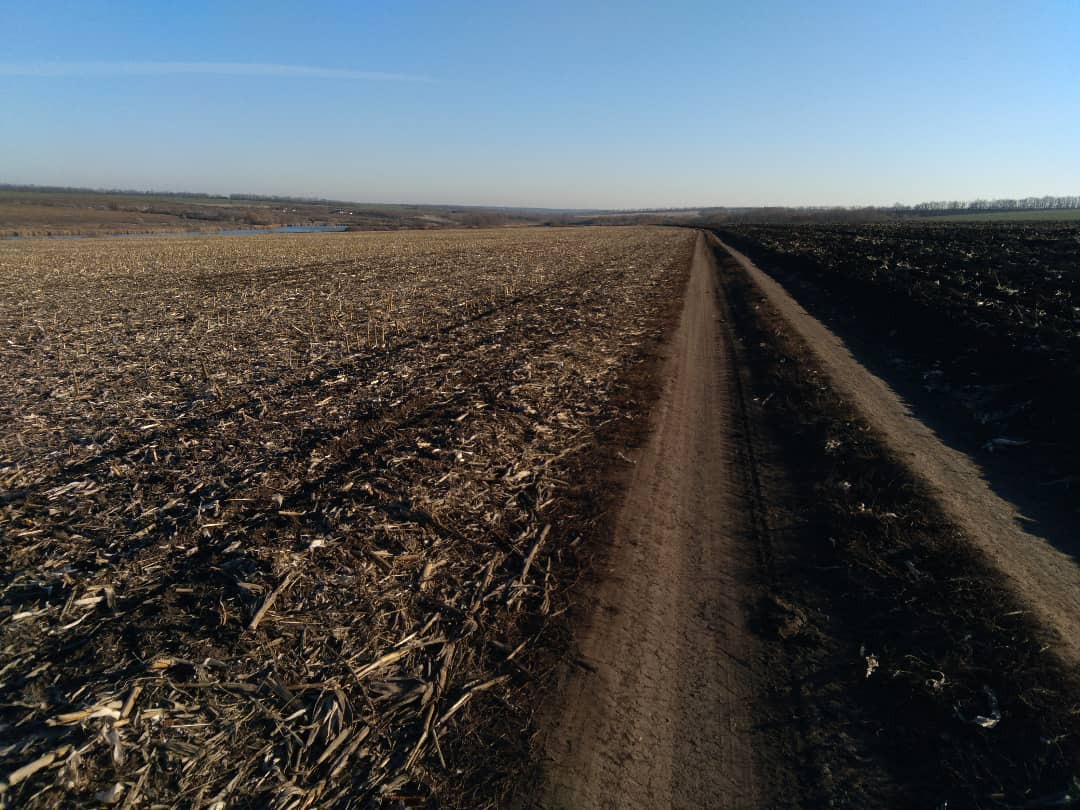

== Sources ==
- Кількість наявного населення по кожному сільському населеному пункту, Кіровоградська область (осіб) - Регіон, Рік (2001(05.12)). database.ukrcensus.gov.ua. Банк даних Державної служби статистики України.
