= Znamianka urban hromada =

Znamianka urban hromada Знам'янська міська громада
- Hromada
- Seal
- Interactive map of Znamianka urban hromada
- Country: Ukraine
- Oblast: Kirovohrad Oblast
- Raion: Kropyvnytskyi Raion

Area
  - Total: 113.1 km^{2} (43.7 sq mi)

Population
  - Total: 28,234
  - Density: 249.6/km^{2} (646.6/sq mi)
- Settlements: 6
- Cities: 1
- Villages: 4
- Towns: 1
- Website: https://znam.gov.ua/

Znamianka urban hromada is a hromada in Kropyvnytskyi Raion, Kirovohrad Oblast, Ukraine. Its administrative center is Znamianka.

The hromada contains the city Znamianka, the town Znamianka Druha and the villages Petrove, Vodiane, Sokilnyky and Novooleksandrivka. It has an area of 113.1 square kilometres (43.7 mi^{2}), and a population of 28,234.

On 29 April 2022, during the Russian invasion of Ukraine, the Znamianka urban hromada adopted the "Program of National Resistance Measures" for 2022, in accordance with national measures regarding martial law, resistance to the Russian invaders, and ensuring the rights of internally displaced persons from warzones in other regions in Ukraine. Kirovohrad Oblast as a whole is a prominent destination for Ukrainian refugees, so many hromadas in the region have adopted similar programs.
