= Balka Orlova (river) =

River in Kirovohrad Oblast, Ukraine

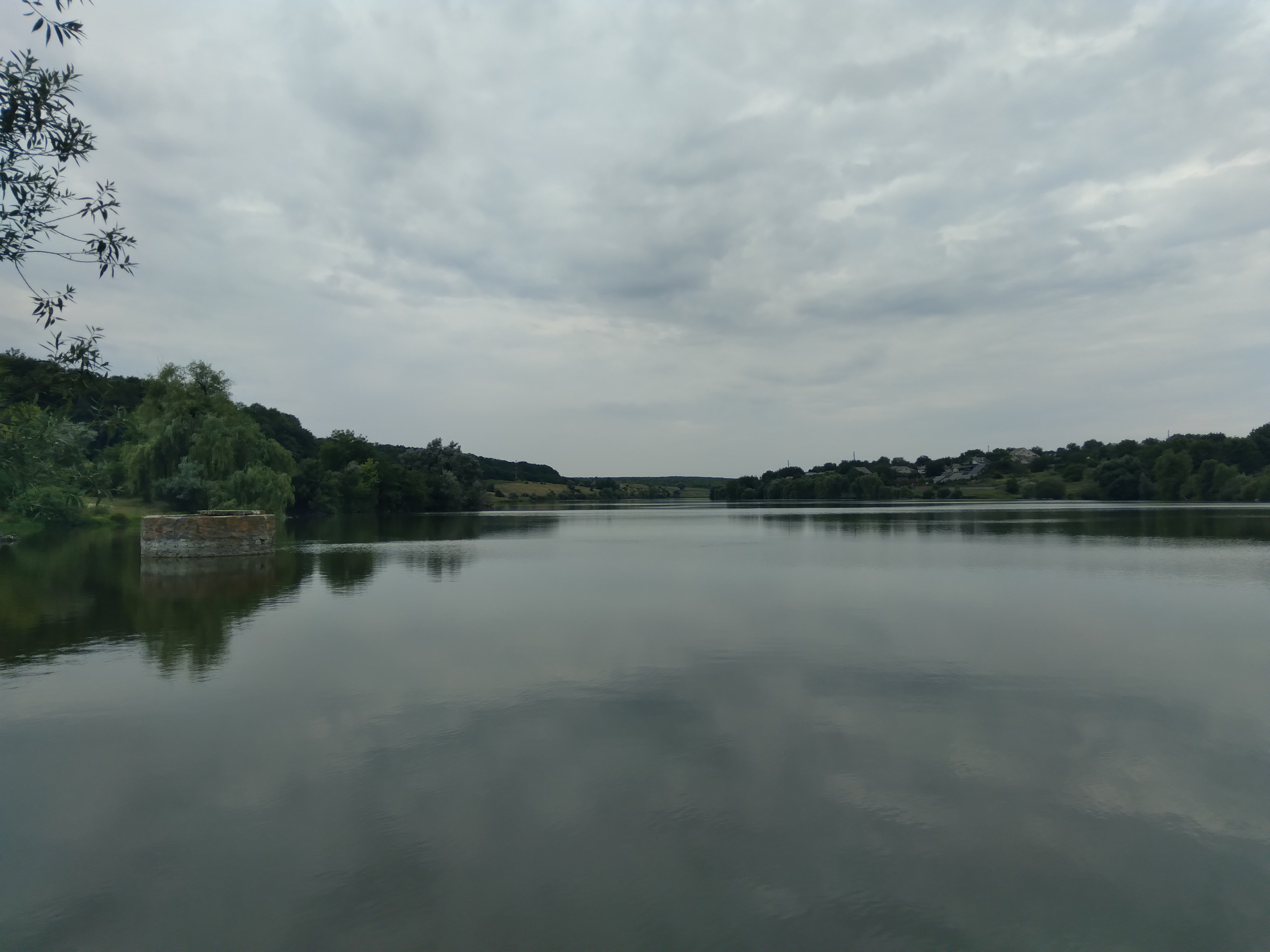

Location
- Country: Ukraine
- Oblast: Kirovohrad Oblast

Physical characteristics
- Source
  - location: Znamianka
  - elevation: 2,8 m
- Mouth: Beshka
- Basin size: 17 km

Basin features
- Progression: Beshka

Balka Orlova (Ukrainian: Балка Орлова) is a river in Kirovohrad Oblast, Ukraine. It is a tributary of the Beshka.

The name of the river comes from the village of the same name founded by a Zaporozhian Cossack nicknamed Orel, which existed here at the beginning of the XVIII century, and in 1958, was annexed to Petrove. Now the entire valley of this river is called Orlova Balka. (lit. Orel's gorge).

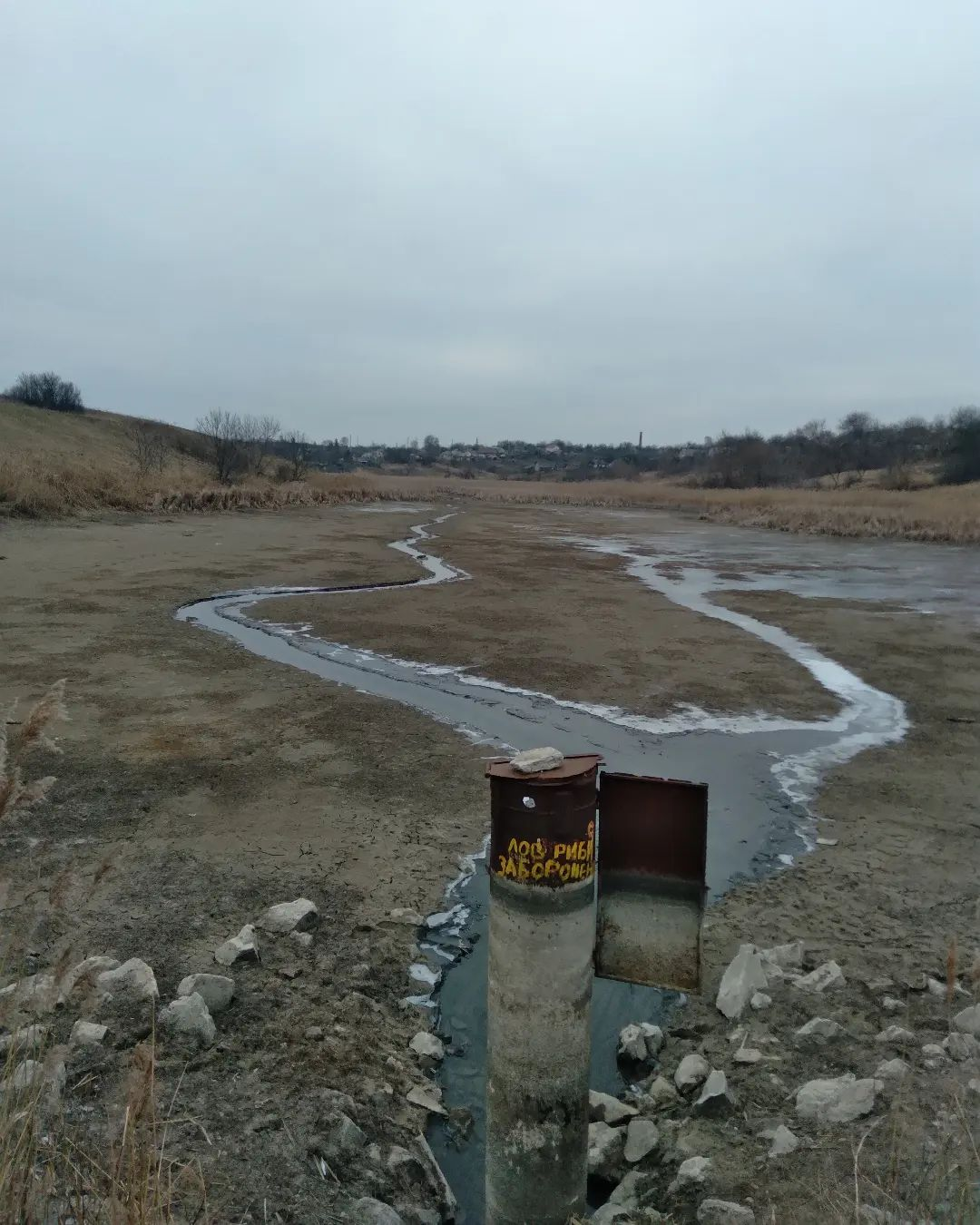
one of the ponds after the opening of a dam in Petrove, this was the size of the river before the installation of dams in the 1970s

It begins near the southwestern outskirts of Znamianka, flows to the southeast through the villages of Petrove, Novooleksandrivka, and Troyanka, and flows into the Beshka within the village of Svitlopil.
