= Znamianka Druha =

Rural locality in Kirovohrad Oblast, Ukraine

Znamianka Druha Знам'янка Друга
- Rural settlement
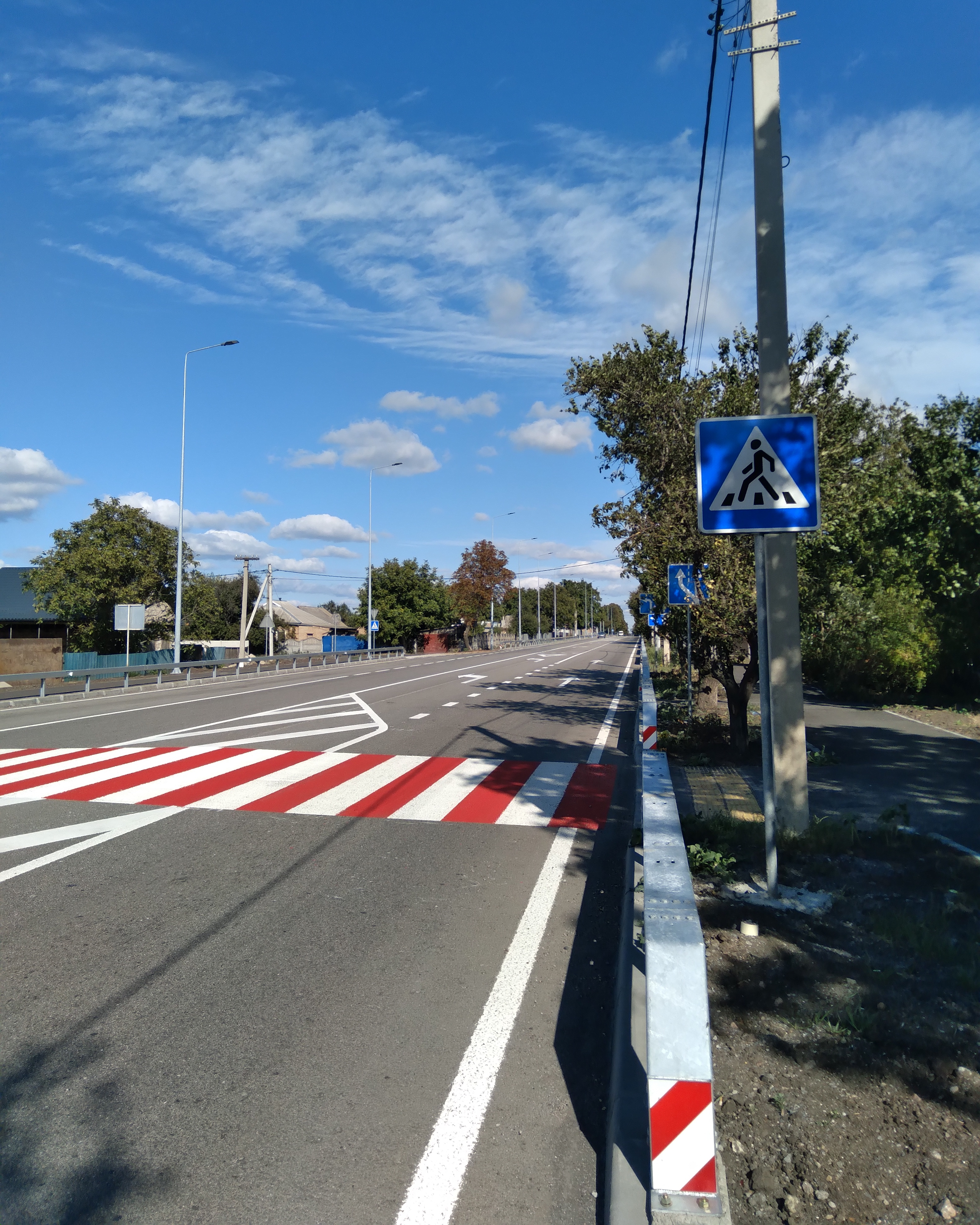

- Location in Kirovohrad Oblast Location in Ukraine
- Coordinates: 48°42′52″N 32°35′32″E
- Country: Ukraine
- Oblast: Kirovohrad Oblast
- Raion: Kropyvnytskyi Raion
- Hromada: Znamianka urban hromada

Population (2022)
  - Total: 5,010
- Time zone: UTC+2 (EET)
  - Summer (DST): UTC+3 (EEST)

Znamianka Druha (Ukrainian: Знам'янка Друга; Russian: Знаменка Вторая) is a rural settlement in Kropyvnytskyi Raion of Kirovohrad Oblast in Ukraine. It is located immediately west of the city of Znamianka. Znamianka Druha belongs to Znamianka urban hromada, one of the hromadas of Ukraine. Population: 5,010 (2022 estimate).

== History ==
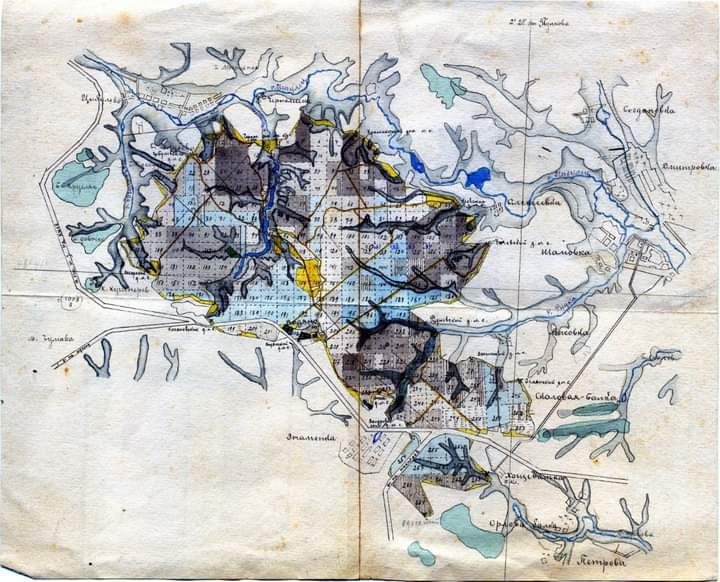
Map of the end of the 19th century

During the Holodomor of 1932-1933, at least 12 villagers died.

Until 18 July 2020, Znamianka Druha belonged to Znamianka Municipality. The municipality was abolished as an administrative unit in July 2020 as part of the administrative reform of Ukraine, which reduced the number of raions of Kirovohrad Oblast to four. The area of Znamianka Municipality was merged into Kropyvnytskyi Raion.

Until 26 January 2024, Znamianka Druha was designated urban-type settlement. On this day, a new law entered into force which abolished this status, and Znamianka Druha became a rural settlement.

== Economy ==
=== Transportation ===
Kolhospna and Znamianka-2 railway stations are located in Znamianka Druha, on the railway connecting Znamianka with Smila and Kropyvnytskyi. In Znamianka, there are further connections to Oleksandriia and Dolynska. There is some passenger traffic.

Highway M12 which connects the settlement with Kropyvnytskyi and Znamianka, where it has further connections to Kyiv and Dnipro.

== Gallery ==
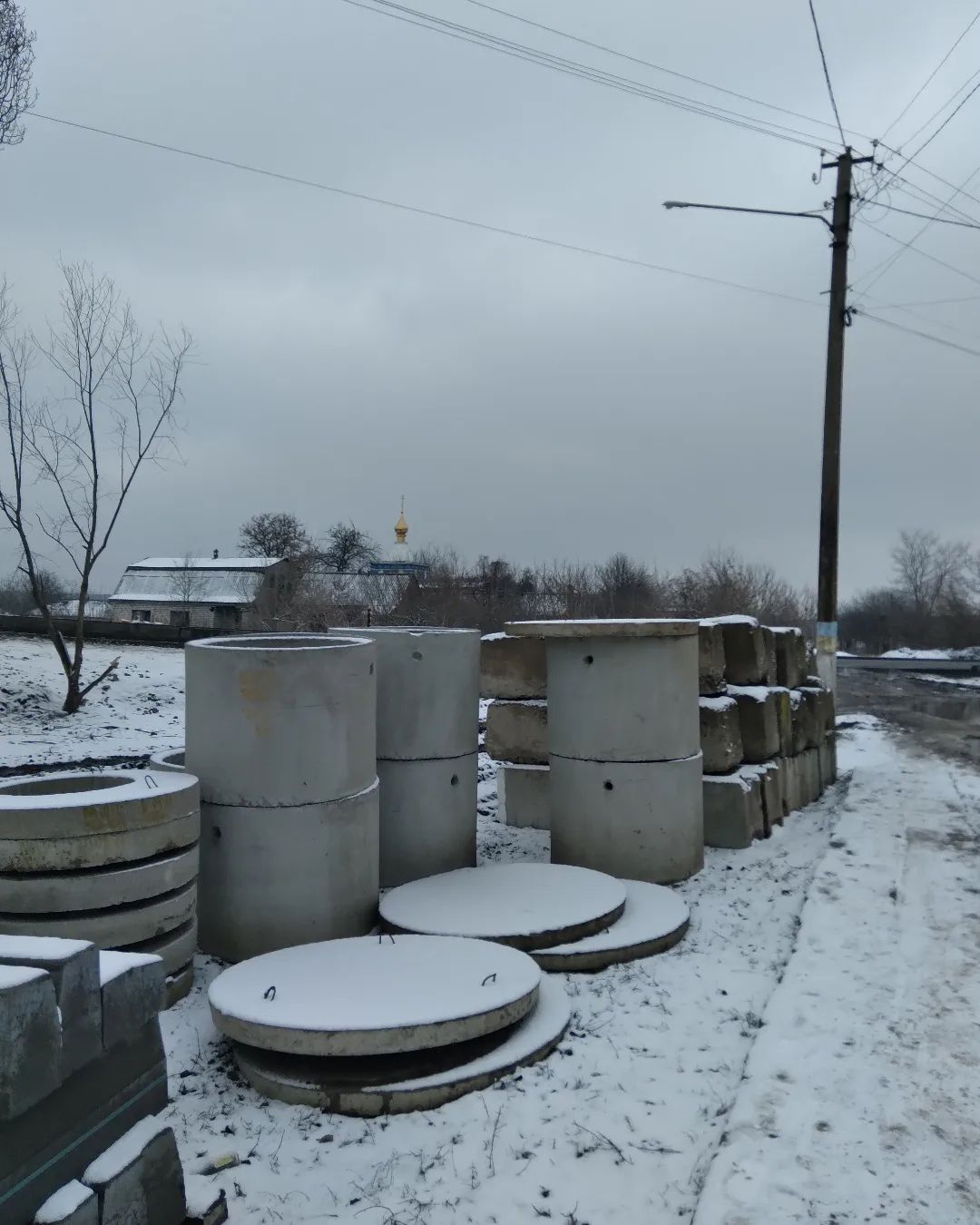
Church

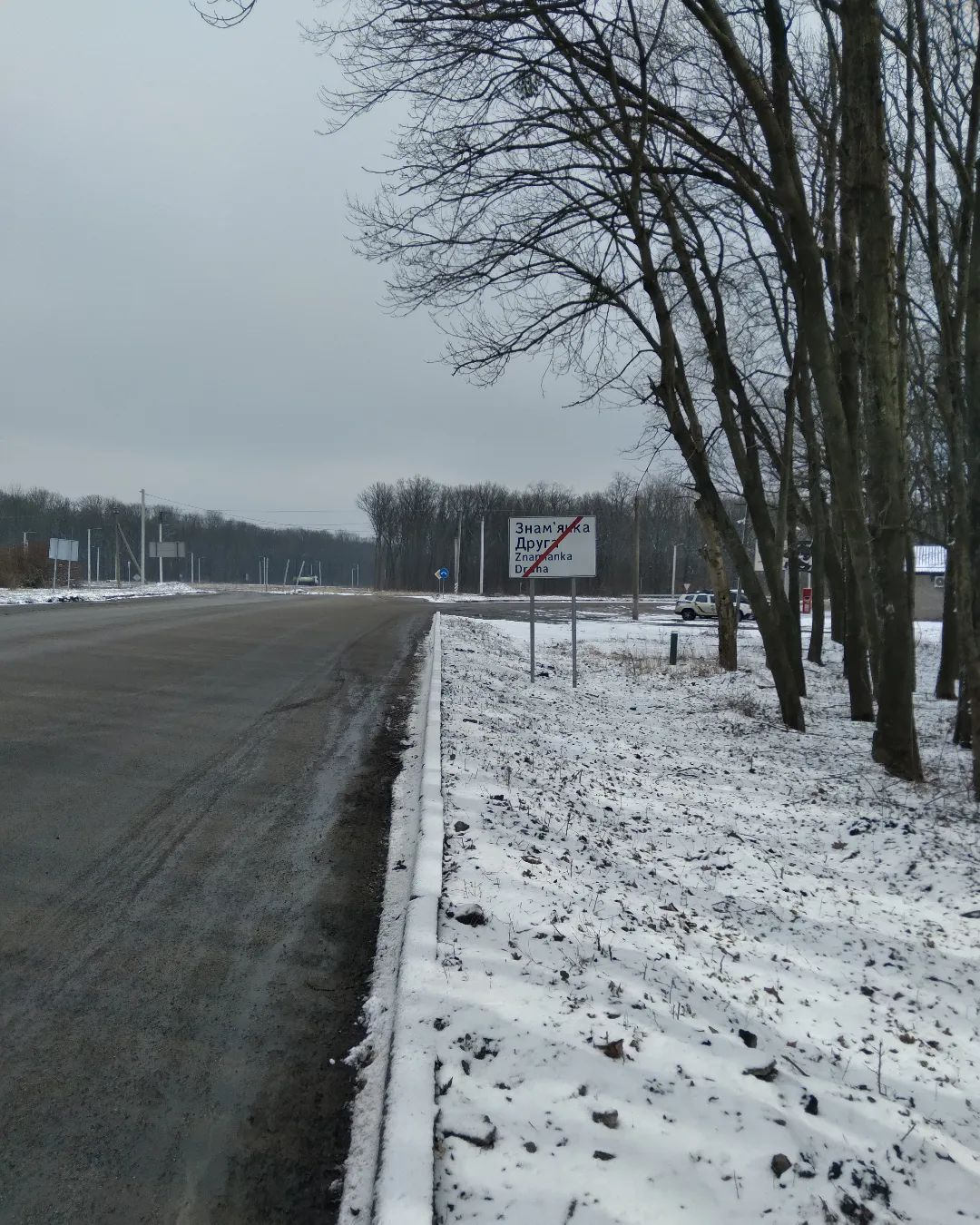
Road sign at the exit

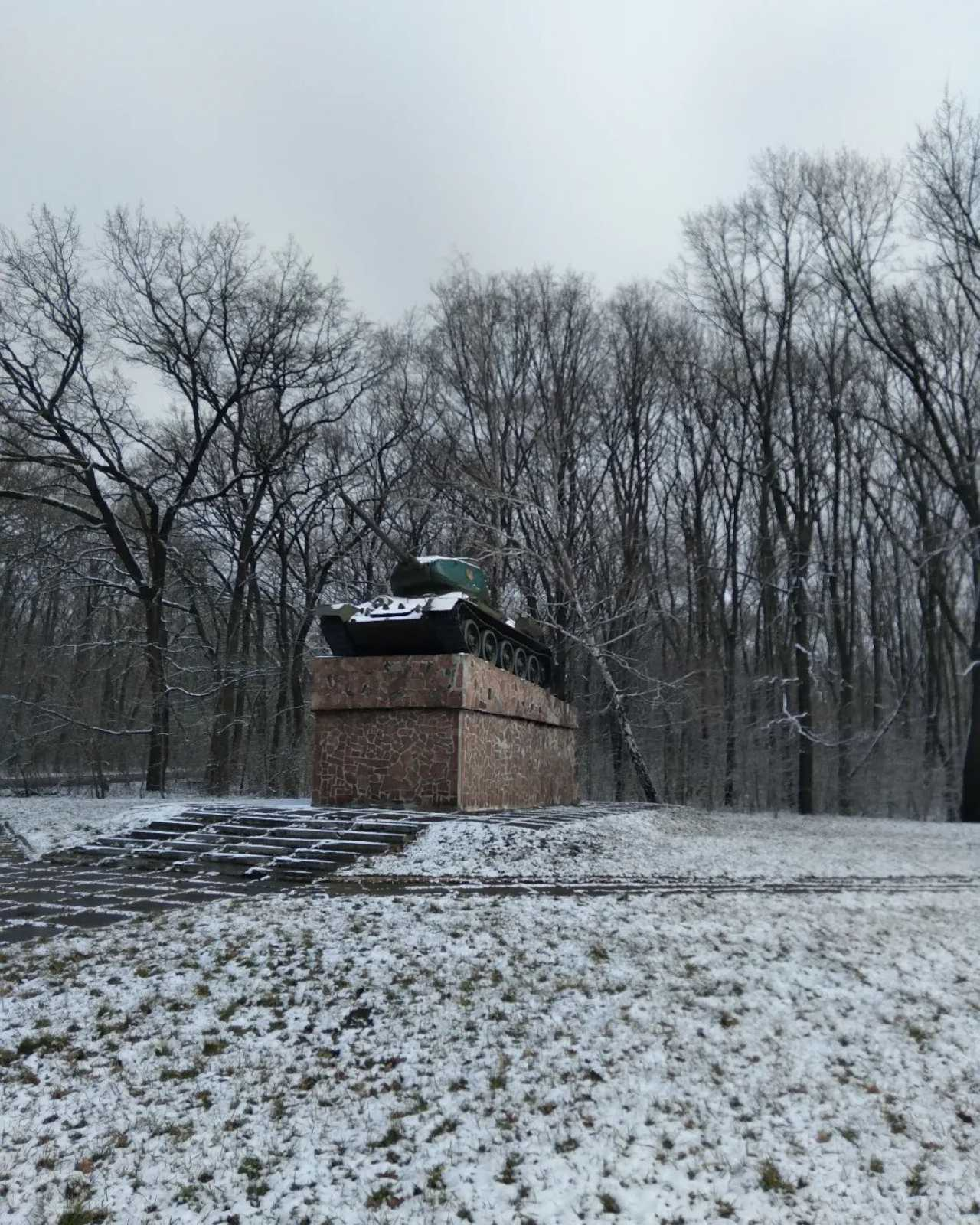
Tank monument
