= Battle of Salicha =

- Part of the January Uprising
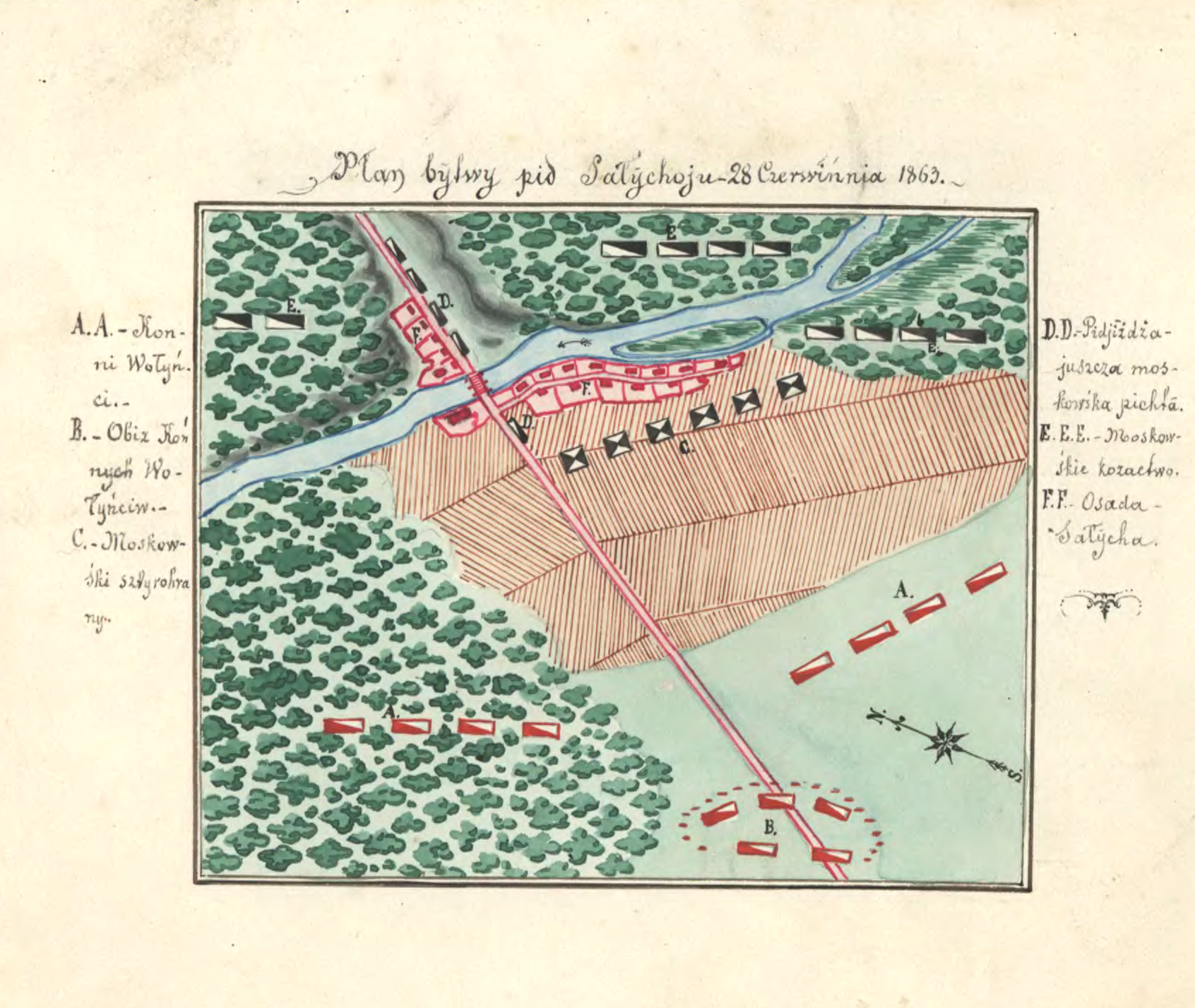
- Contemporary sketch of the battle
Date	26 May 1863
Location	Salicha
Result	Polish victory

Belligerents
(Poland) Polish insurgents	Russian Empire

Commanders and leaders
Edmund Różycki	Captain Lomonosov

Strength
260	720

The Battle of Salicha was a clash between Polish insurgent forces and units of the Imperial Russian Army during the January Uprising. It took place on May 26, 1863 near the village of Salicha (Salikha), Russian Empire (the village now lies in Khmelnytskyi Oblast, Ukraine). Insurgent forces were commanded by Edmund Różycki, and the battle ended in Polish victory.

Edmund Różycki, a talented Polish military officer, was tasked with carrying the uprising into Volhynia, Podolia and Ukraine, provinces of the Kingdom of Poland before the late-18th-century Partitions of Poland. Różycki agreed, on the condition that Józef Wysocki of Warsaw's National Government provides military support from eastern Galicia.

On May 8, 1863, Różycki together with his party marched from Żytomierz (today Zhytomyr) and headed westwards, to Galicia (Austrian Partition of Poland), hoping to meet reinforcements along the way. After a few days, the insurgents reached Starokonstantynów (today Starokostiantyniv) and their situation became desperate. No reinforcements arrived, other insurgent units in Ukraine had been destroyed by the Russians, and Poles were chased by three Russian units. Finally, on May 26 near the village of Salicha, the insurgents faced a much stronger and better-equipped detachment of the Imperial Russian Army.

Altogether, Polish forces had some 260 men, while Russians had 720 soldiers, including 120 Cossacks. Różycki decided to use the element of surprise, attacking Russian infantry before it got off their wagons. The insurgents carried out a ferocious attack, with scythes and bayonets. Russian forces were dispersed, and additional units of the Russian Army, which arrived to the battlefield, did not attack the Poles, fearing another defeat.

After the battle, Różycki and his men waited for two more days, hoping that the promised Galician reinforcements would join them. Since they did not arrive, the insurgents decided to enter Austrian territory, where their unit was dissolved.

== Sources ==
- Stefan Kieniewicz: Powstanie styczniowe. Warszawa: Państwowe Wydawnictwo Naukowe, 1983. ISBN 83-01-03652-4.
