= Lodomeria =

Historical Ruthenian duchy

Coat of arms

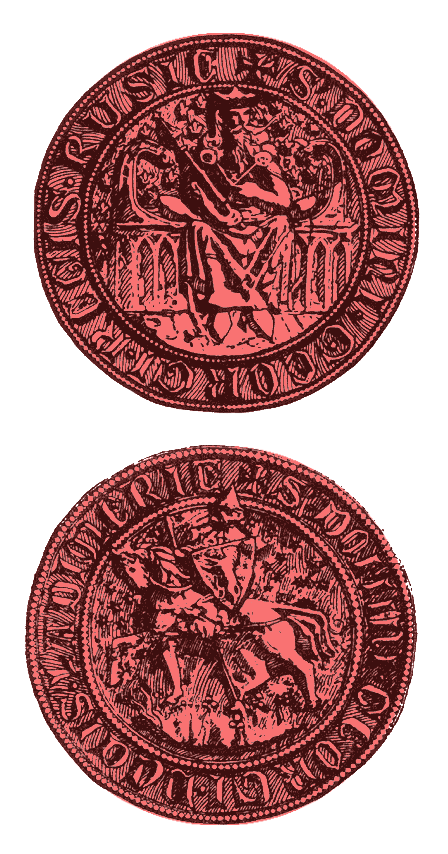
Seal of Giorgi, Regis Rusie, Ducis Ladimerie; ("Ladimerie" appears on the side with the knight)

Lodomeria (Ukrainian: Лодомерія, Lodomeriia; German: Lodomerien) is the Latinized name of Volodymyria, a synonymous term for the historical region of Volhynia, centered during the Middle Ages in the city of Volodymyr (Old Slavic: Володимѣръ, Volodiměrŭ). After the capital city, the medieval Principality of Volhynia in the Kievan Rus' was also known as the Principality of Volodymyr-in-Volhynia, and on those grounds a Latin term was coined, rendering as Lodomeria (or Ladomeria, Ladimeria, Ladimiria, Vladimiria). The most prominent use of those Latin terms during the medieval times were attested in royal titles of Hungarian kings, since the reign of king Andrew II (1205-1235), who was styled as King of Galicia and Lodomeria, thus expressing pretensions on supreme rule over those regions. Since both Galicia and Lodomeria (Volhynia) where thus included among the lands of the Hungarian Crown, those titles were used by Hungarian kings up to 1918.

Latin designation Lodomeria and its variants also appeared in Latin titles of various medieval princes who ruled or claimed Volhynia and its capital city of Volodymyr.

Upon the first partition of Poland in 1772, much of Galicia and some parts of Lodomeria (Volhynia) - with the city of Belz, were annexed by the Habsburg Monarchy, whose rulers were also kings of Hungary and thus holding titles on those lands, that were organized as the "Kingdom of Galicia and Lodomeria". Most of Volhynia (including the city of Volodymyr) remained as part of rump Poland until eventually being annexed in Third Partition of Poland (1795), when some western parts of historical Lodomeria (Volhynia) were assigned to Habsburgs and included into the newly created province of New Galicia, while central and eastern parts (including the city of Volodymyr) were annexed by the Russian Empire.

Lodomeria remained part of the Grand title of the emperors of Austria until 1918.

An item in American Notes and Queries published in 1889 identified Lodomeria as an ancient district of Poland situated in the eastern portion of the country (at that time part of the Russian Empire, Volhynian Governorate).

About 988, the Ruthenian Grand Prince Vladimir the Great (Ukrainian: Volodymyr, born c. 958, Grand Prince of Kiev from 980 to 1015) founded the town of Volodymyr, named after himself. In 1198, one of his descendants, Roman Mstislavich, called his own domain "the Kingdom of Galicia and Lodomeria". In 1340, King Casimir of Poland annexed Lodomeria to Poland.

== Origin of the title ==
The name "Volhynia" is first mentioned in Ruthenian chronicles as a region inhabited by a tribe called the Volhynians that was conquered by the Grand Prince of Kiev Vladimir the Great. Volhynia changed hands several times throughout the following centuries. About 1199, it was merged with the Principality of Halych to form the Principality (later Kingdom) of Galicia and Volhynia under Prince Roman the Great. After the death of Roman the Great in 1205, Andrew II of Hungary adopted the title of "King of Lodomeria" (as well as of Galicia), in reference to Volhynia. Although the Hungarians were driven out from Halych-Volhynia by 1221, Hungarian kings continued to add Galicia et Lodomeria to their official titles.

In 1527, the Habsburgs inherited those titles, together with the Hungarian crown. In 1772, Empress Maria Theresa, Archduchess of Austria and Queen of Hungary, decided to use those historical claims to justify her participation in the first partition of Poland. In fact, the territories acquired by Austria did not correspond exactly to those of former Halych-Volhynia. Volhynia, including the city of Volodymyr, was taken in 1795 by the Russian Empire, not Austria. On the other hand, much of Lesser Poland did become part of Austrian Galicia. Moreover, despite the fact that the claim derived from the historical Hungarian crown, Galicia and Lodomeria was not officially assigned to Hungary, and after the Ausgleich of 1867, it found itself in Cisleithania, or the Austrian-administered part of Austria-Hungary.

The full official name of the new Austrian province was "Kingdom of Galicia and Lodomeria with the Duchies of Auschwitz and Zator". After the incorporation of the Free City of Kraków in 1846, it was extended to "Kingdom of Galicia and Lodomeria, and the Grand Duchy of Kraków with the Duchies of Auschwitz and Zator" (German: Königreich Galizien und Lodomerien mit dem Großherzogtum Krakau und den Herzogtümern Auschwitz und Zator). Therefore, from 1772 to 1918, "Lodomeria" was claimed by the Austrian monarchs, even though Volhynia, the region the name had originally referred to, was part of the Russian Empire.

== Sources ==
- Font, Márta (2000). "On the frontiers of West and East: The Hungarian kingdom and the Galician principality between the eleventh and thirteenth centuries" (PDF). Annual of Medieval Studies at Central European University. 6: 171–180. Archived from the original on 20 February 2025.
- Font, Márta (2012). "Principles and Methods in the Policy of the Hungarian King, Andreas II concerning the Galician-Volhynian Principality". Principalities in lands of Galicia and Volhynia in international relations in the 11th-14th centuries. Colloquia Russica, I/2. Krakow: Uniwersytet Jagielloński. pp. 228–235.
- Font, Márta; Barabás, Gábor (2019). Coloman, King of Galicia and Duke of Slavonia (1208–1241): Medieval Central Europe and Hungarian Power. Leeds: Arc Humanities Press. ISBN 978-1-64189-024-3.
- Font, Márta (2021). The Kings of the House of Árpád and the Rurikid Princes: Cooperation and conflict in medieval Hungary and Kievan Rus' (PDF). Budapest: Research Centre for the Humanities. Archived from the original on 25 December 2025.
- Font, Márta (2023). "The Title rex Galiciae between Ambitions and Reality (c. 1100-r. 1400)". Unions and Divisions: New Forms of Rule in Medieval and Renaissance Europe. New York: Routledge. pp. 107–118. ISBN 978-1-000-68558-9.
- Wolff, Larry (2004). "Inventing Galicia: Messianic Josephinism and the Recasting of Partitioned Poland". Slavic Review. 63 (4): 818–840. doi:10.2307/1520422. JSTOR 1520422.
- Wolff, Larry (2010). The Idea of Galicia: History and Fantasy in Habsburg Political Culture. Stanford: Stanford University Press. ISBN 978-0-8047-7429-1.
