= Volhynian folk costume =

Traditional clothing of the Ukrainian Volyn

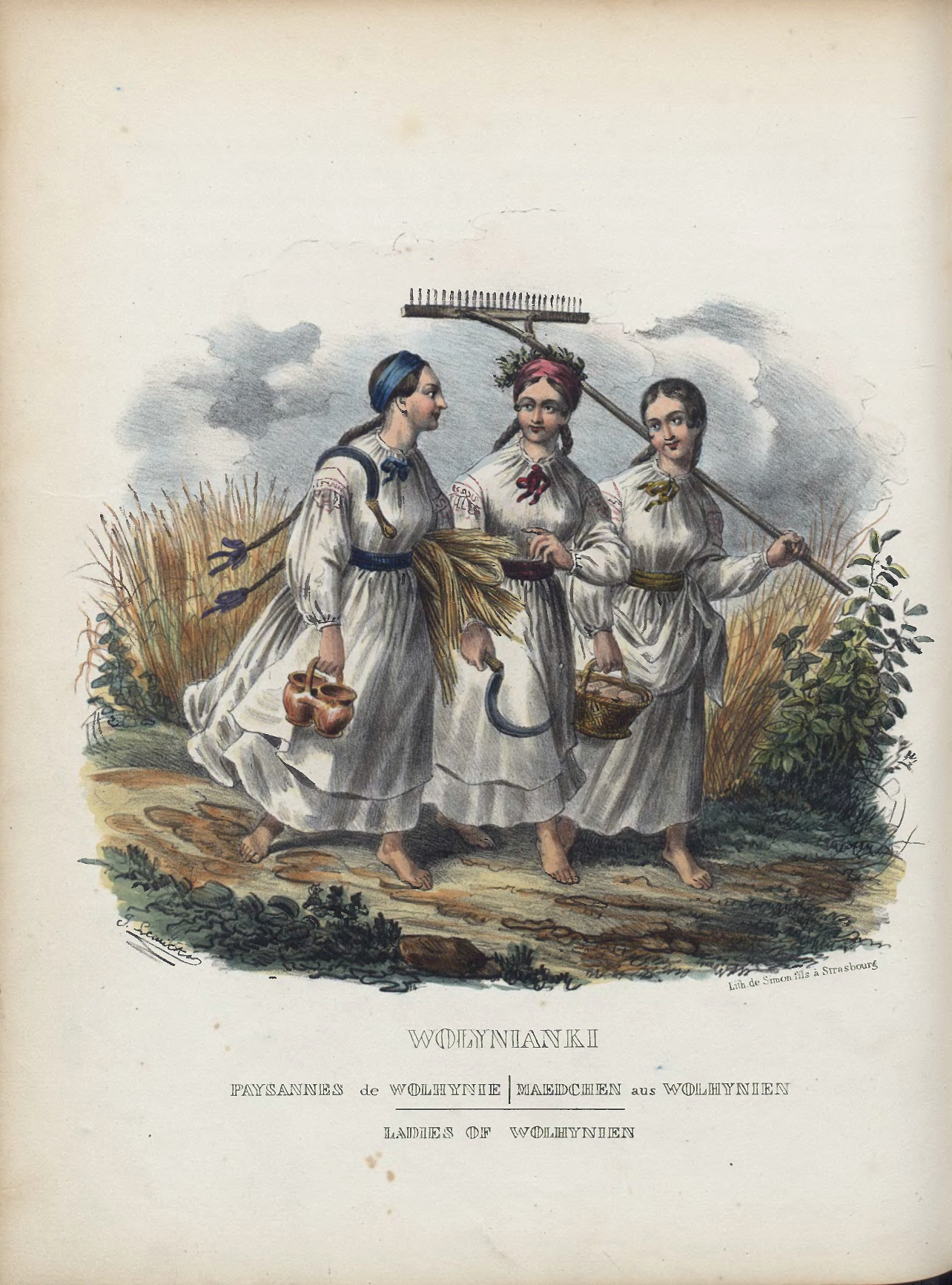
Young Volhynians.

Volhynian folk costume (Ukrainian: Волинський стрій) is a type of Ukrainian national clothing worn in Volhynia. The costume includes Polesia influences such as colourful ochipoks, fitted corset-like waistcoats and striped skirts, as well as Dnieper Ukraine: namitka headscarfs, kersetka vests and dark skirts.

The costume was heavily gendered with women generally wearing more colourful and fitted garments. Most clothing items were made from linen and decorated with embroidery, primarily red and black in colour. In warmer weather, Volhynians wore shirts and skirts (women) or pants (men); in colder months, they put on additional outer garments made from linen fabric or heavier materials such as wool. The head coverings included pieces of cloth, hats and straw hats for summer.

== Geography and history ==
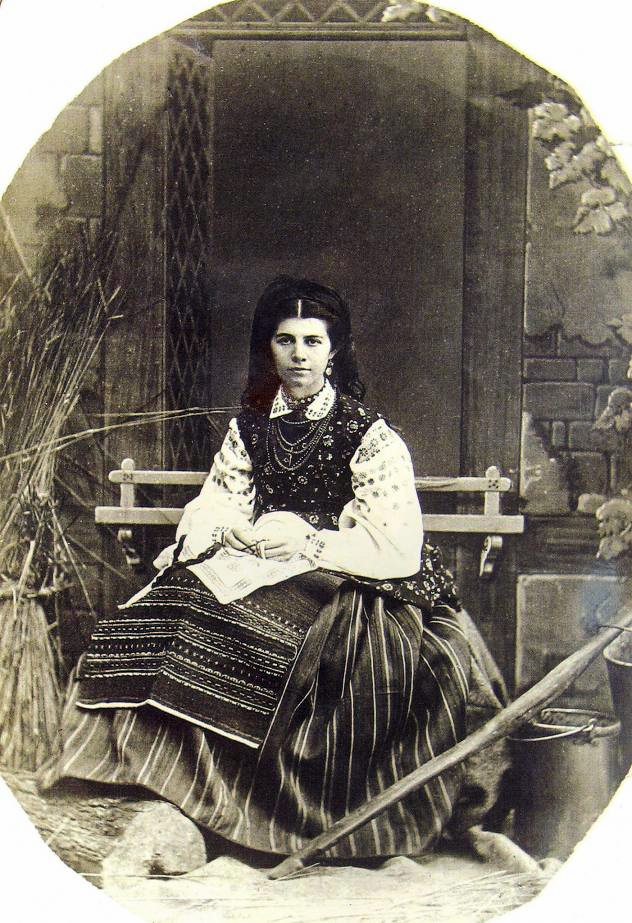
Olena Pchilka in a Volhynian shirt, waistcoat and litnyk skirt.

Volhynia encompasses the following region: south of Lviv Oblast, north-west of Volyn Oblast, Shumsk and Kremenets raions of Ternopil Oblast, south of Khmelnytskyi Oblast, north of Rivne Oblast, south-west of Zhytomyr Oblast. The main cities are Volodymyr, Lutsk, Rivne, Zdolbuniv, Kremenets and Starokostiantyniv.

The Volhynian costume has a strong Polish influence due to the fact that some of the modern territory of the Ukrainian Volhynia (Volyn) belonged to Poland from 1569 to 1939. It also shares traits with the costumes of neighbouring regions: Polissya, Halychyna, Dnieper Ukraine and the Polish Chełm Land.

Ethnographer Olena Pchilka researched the local embroidery patterns and clothing. The typical local embroidery design made of geometric floral patterns emerged in the middle of the 19th century. Examples include oak leaves and branches.

== Women's clothing ==
The main part of both women's and men's clothing was the shirt, sorochka (Ukrainian: сорочка), made primarily from linen. The women's shirts have a straight body, which sometimes was reinforced with a pidtochka, an additional piece of sturdier cloth sewn to the shirt from waist down. Festive shirts were made whole, without the pidtochka. The overall length of the shirt reached the knees, except in the eastern regions, where the hem goes down beyond the hem of the skirt.

Some shirts' sleeves have a top part (Ukrainian: уставка, romanized: ustavka), which is pleated near the neck opening just like the body; the sleeves of others are attached directly to the neck. The white or black-and-red satin stitch or pattern darning embroidery either covered the sleeve completely, or was added only to the top part. Western Volhynians added a thin string of embroidered ornament near the sleeve trimming. The sleeves could be finished with a pulled or ruffled cuff, or be shortened and left freely hanging.

The eastern Volhynian shirts have a stand-up collar, which is decorated with knitted drawn thread work, while western ones had a wide sailor collar. Southern and western Volhynian shirts often had turnover collars. The body of the southern Volhynia women's shirt had an opening decorated with geometric and plant ornaments.

Typical embroidery motifs included geometric diamonds, octagrams, broken lines and crosses. The limited colour palette of the traditional Volhynian embroidery was expanded at the beginning of the 20th century by around 20 additional colours to the traditional redwork or blackwork.

Volhynian waistcoats were sewn from cotton or cashmere, tightly fitted, waist-long or longer; they had a cloth belt and a ruffled hem and were fully embroidered. The waistcoat was lined with sturdy homespun fabric and had metal or celluloid buttons that went through cutout buttonholes. Western Volhynian waistcoats were shorter and made of black corduroy.

The main lower body garment of Volhynian women was a homespun skirt made from hemp, wool, cotton, linen or wool blend. Most skirts were brightly coloured, striped or chequered; with a straight silhouette, tied up with a ribbon and gathered at the top. Typical holiday/church garments included a colourful striped skirt called litnyk (Ukrainian: літник). Another type of a skirt is an andarak (Ukrainian: андарак) made from wool and decorated with bright checkers or stripes. Daily-worn skirts would often have a section of unbleached fabric in the front. Other skirts would be worn with a white cotton apron with an embroidered hem (typically, with black-and-red geometric ornaments) or a green or dark blue two-sided wool one. The top of the apron had ribbons to tie it up while the hem was decorated with another ribbon. The horizontal stripes of the skirt had to harmonise with the lateral shirt ornaments.

Volhynian women started making their skirts from colourful industrial chequered cotton and wool in the beginning of the 20th century, using the same silhouette: a rectangular skirt gathered at the waist. Another new development of that time was the appearance of urban sleeveless dresses in the countryside, "skirts with a vest" (Ukrainian: спідниця зі стаником, romanized: spidnytsia zi stanykom), which were named after the fabric they are made of, for example, a silk "skirt" would be called Ukrainian: спідниця шовкова, romanized: spidnytsia shovkova. These dresses were made of six rectangular pieces of fabric and had cotton lining, colourful cotton velvet hems and waist pleats; the neckline was either square or round, with metal snaps or small porcelain buttons. The armhole and the neckline were adorned with silk or black cotton velvet, or a multicoloured ribbon. The edge was adorned with either black velvet inserts encircled with metal snaps, or an ornament embroidered with colourful worsted thread using the horodky openwork method (Ukrainian: городки).

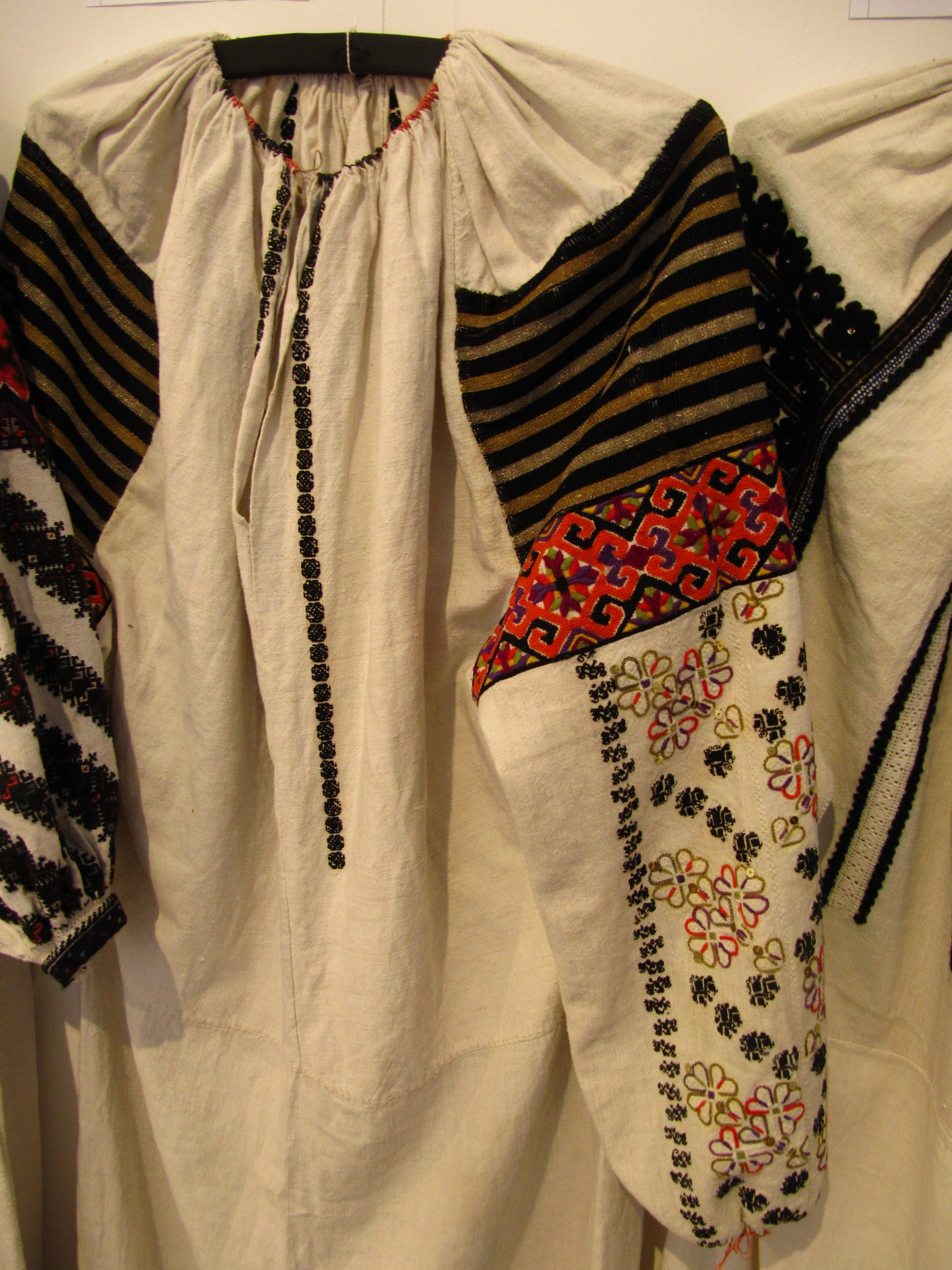
Ivan Honchar museum vyshyvanka with a pidtochka.

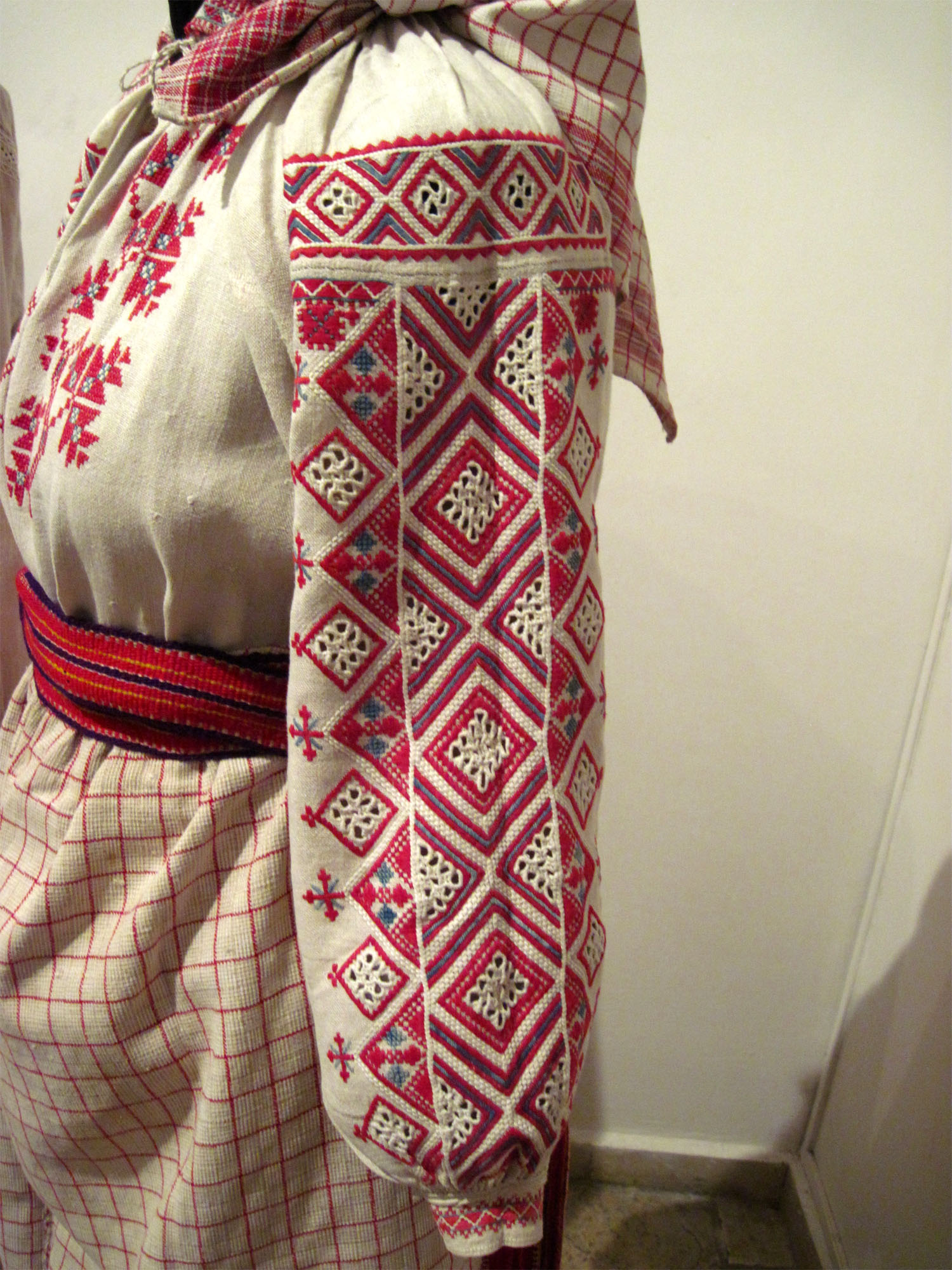
A Rivne region shirt with a thin string of embroidery at the cuff.

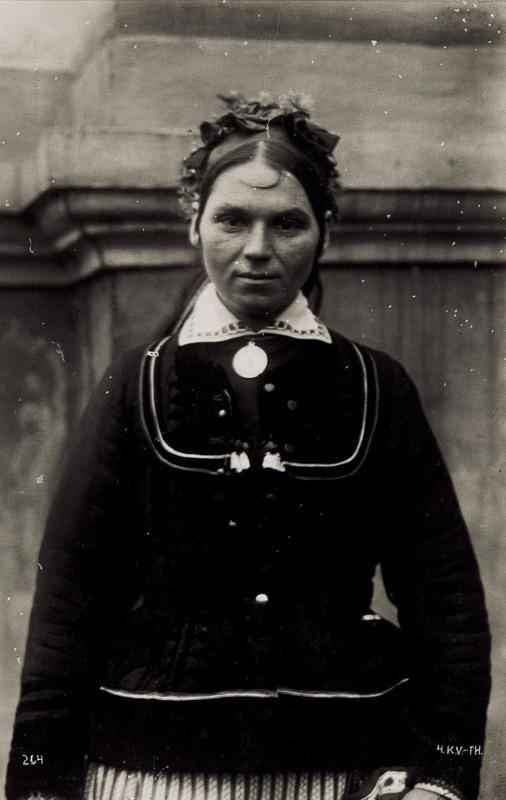
A peasant woman from Volodymyr wearing a waistcoat.

== Men's clothing ==
Male shirts were made of either homespun fabrics or of industry-made cotton mitkal. The collar was either stand-up or turnover, adorned with satin-stitch or cross-stitch embroidery. The opening was usually put at the centre of the garment or, in Western regions, on the left-hand side; it had a single tin or knitted button and a loop to close it. The hem of the shirts meant to be worn untucked usually was decorated with a narrow red border. The eastern Volhynian male shirts had their shoulders embroidered with red-and-blue or white threads. The earlier shirt designs included no embroidery at the front except for the collar and cuffs; the front panel embroidery is a later development. Men wore their shirts untucked and tied them with belts.

Men wore trousers of two main types: the long straight kholoshni (Ukrainian: холошні) made from blue-and-white striped linen-cotton blended fabric and the linen nohavytsi (Ukrainian: ногавиці). Kholoshni were gathered at the belt, they had a single cutout at the front, which closed them with a single button and a cutout buttonhole. Nohavytsi, on the other hand, were made of a special homespun fabric that had alternating unbleached and white threads.

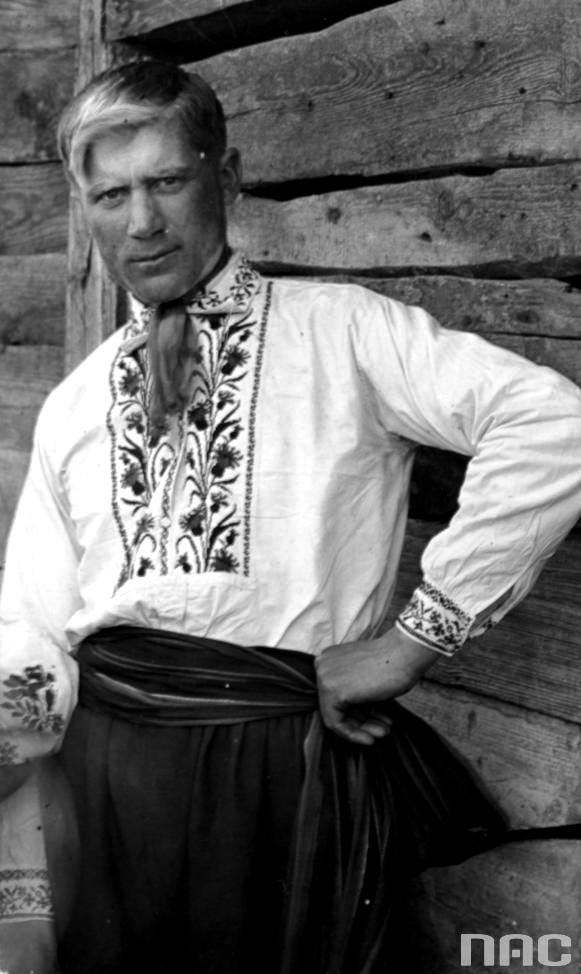
Ukrainian from Volyn.

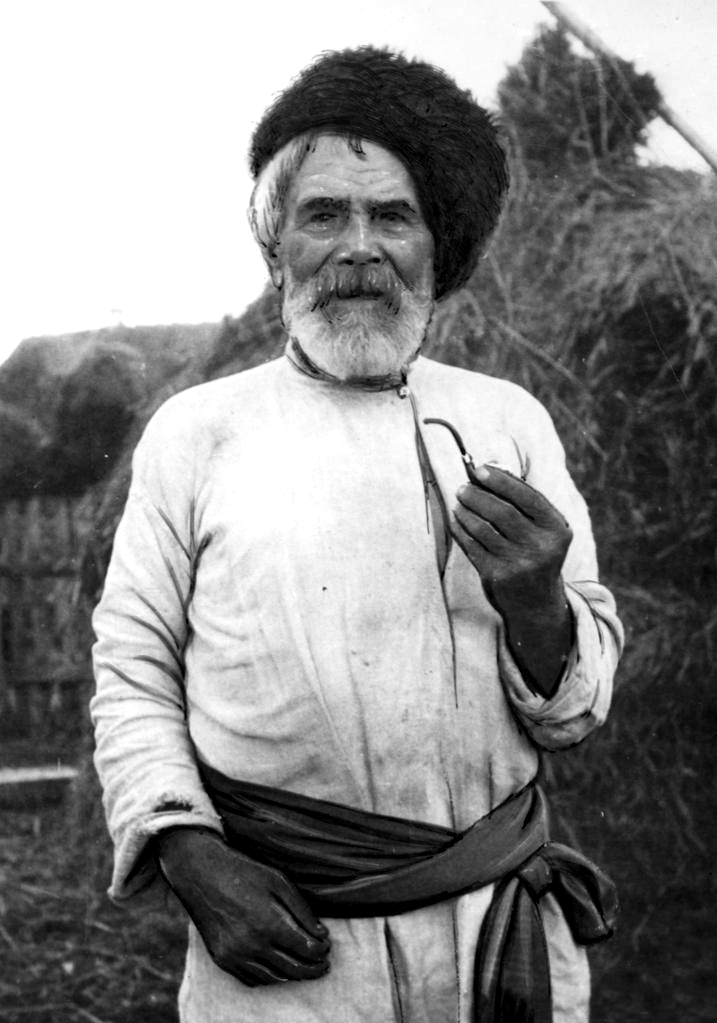
A left-hand opening in a Sarny district shirt.

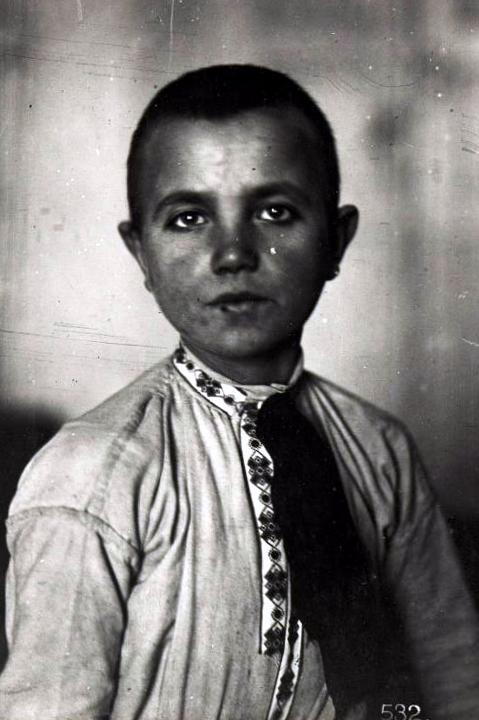
A young Volhynian boy, 1917.

== Outer garments ==
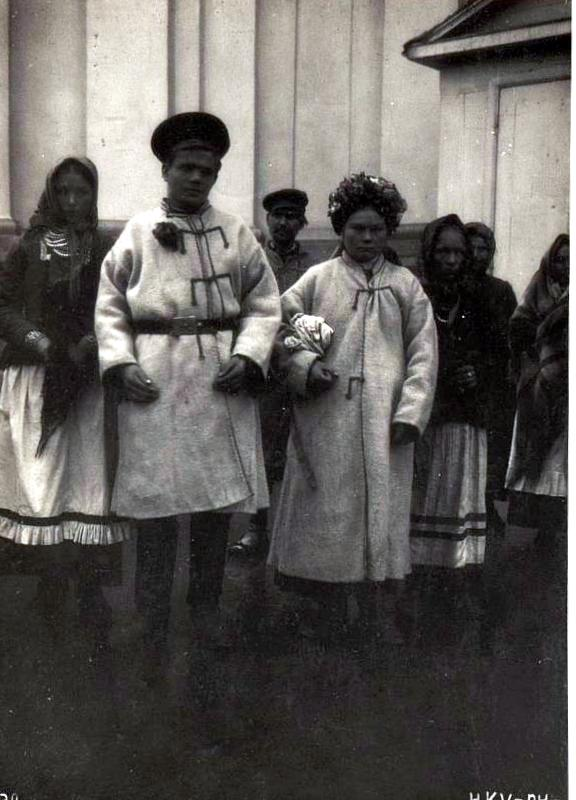
Volhynian peasant wedding, 1917. Groom and bride wear a svyta.

Both men and women wore long coats called svyta (Ukrainian: свита; опанча; куртина; сермяга), which reached at least to the knees. Svyta had a straight back, sewn-in side wedges that created folds, and a stand-up, turnover, or falling collar. Sometimes svyta had a big hood attached to the collar. Side and waist seams, top of the lap, sleeve edges and pocket openings were embroidered with blue, green or red worsted ribbons, or black, brown, or yellow wool threads. Women's svyta was more decorated compared to the men's.

Knee-long kaftans made from multicoloured striped homespun fabric had no fasteners; women's kaftans could also be made from cashmere with calico lining, shoulder and waist pleats, fastened with metal hook-and-eye closures. The Volhynian women's kaftan had a black velvet falling collar adorned with navy blue ribbons and long straight sleeves with black velvet cuffs. Several similar garments include the knee-long cherkeska (Ukrainian: черкеска) made of homespun broadcloth, men's chemerka (Ukrainian: чемерка), which reached below the knees and had a pleated hem, and a nearly-identical chugai (Ukrainian: чугай), which had two double sets of hook-and-eye closures. Cherkeskas and chemerkas had the same type of fasteners, collar and cuffs as kaftans. A shorter garment, the kutsaya vest (Ukrainian: куцая, lit. "reduced") got its name from its below-waist length. The hook-and-eye closures were sewn to the left side of the vest; it had a falling collar, its small lapels and cuffs were decorated with black ribbon.

Women's kapota (Ukrainian: капота) was made from broadcloth and reached below the knees. The sides of the garment were adorned with semicircles and horodky embroidery; the left side had a fastener. Kapota had a dark blue sailor collar with a round back decorated with embroidery. Kapota could be worn by men too. An older type of knee-long women's outer clothing is kutsan (Ukrainian: куцан, or spentser Ukrainian: спенцер), also made from broadcloth, but, unlike others, it had sewn-in wedges that created folds and a small stand-up collar. South-western Volhynians wore shortened kutsans made from dark brown cloth. Another outer garment is kakhtanik (Ukrainian: кахтаник, кафтаник, каптаник), a dark grey, dark blue or raspberry-coloured lined cardigan with long and narrow sleeves.

Kabaty (Ukrainian: кабати) is a Western Volhynian 19-century unisex garment made fitted for women and loose for men. Kabaty for warm weather were stitched together from cotton fabric while the winter ones were made from wool or wool-blended fabric; they had very narrow stand-up collars and decorated with colourful embroidery.

In winter time, Volhynians wore white kozhukhs with sheep fur collars, two side buttons and pockets. The right lap was embroidered from the top and up to the waist. Western Volhynian women also wore shorter vests decorated with black sheep fur and embroidery, as well as bekeshi (Ukrainian: бекеші), a longer wool coat.

Men wore striped cloth sashes decorated with tassels (homemade from linen or wool, usually 24 cm wide and 2,5 m long), or leather belts with metal buckles; sometimes the belt would have a tobacco poach and a loop to hold a knife. Women's sashes were normally made from fabric or woven, they were narrower than men's.

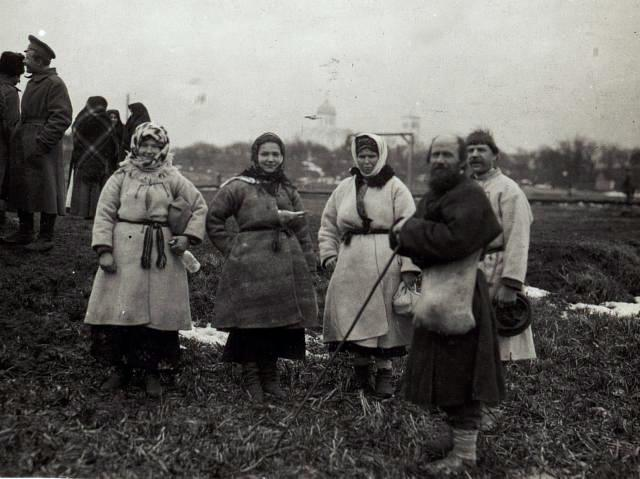
Volhynian peasants on the Vodokhreshche day.

== Head covering and hairstyles ==
Women wore headscarfs and namitka wimples (Ukrainian: намітка) as well as ochipoks. The headscarfs (kerchiefs) were the most popular daily head coverings for both city and village residents. The wimples were made from cotton gauze embroidered with red cotton threads, from homespun fabric, or from soft red chintz, with a string to tie it around the head. Another typical head covering was a "wimple with a kerchief" (Ukrainian: хустка з чепцем) made from two pieces: a knit bonnet and a headscarf wrapped around it. Namitka wimples are an older type of head covering; they were made from a narrow piece of cloth draped under the chin and at the back of the head.

Unmarried Volhynian women parted their hair in the middle and wove it into two braids. They wore flower crowns, headscarfs and kozubenkas (Ukrainian: козубенька), which are 8-cm tall firm cylinders covered with colourful fabric and ribbons. The flower crowns were adorned with rooster feathers dyed green and ribbons hanging from the back. Married women wore kymbalka (Ukrainian: кимбалка), a cylindrical ochipok with a hard wooden top wrapped in a netting. Their unbraided hair could be wrapped around the kymbalka, or cut around the ear level and parted in the middle. Western Volhynian newlywed women would not wear a head covering for two more weeks after the wedding.

Another type of a common head covering is a towel-like headscarf made from a 3 metre long piect of linen fabric with embroidery at both ends. The rushnyk would be tied at the back of the head and left hanging; in the southern part of Volhynia it could reach the ground. This headcovering replaced the namitka wimple.

Men wore textile hats with four corners or a round top, shelomok or rogatka (Ukrainian: шеломок, рогатка), and cylindrical fur hats. A summer straw hat was a typical head covering for warm weather. Men cut their hair in the round (Ukrainian: під макітру) or left the back hair to grow longer, akin to a mullet, known as pidvorota (Ukrainian: підворота.

The ancient Volhynian women wore metal temple rings and silver crescent-shaped pendants as well as glass bracelets imported from Kyiv. Metal jewellery survived in the form of raspberry-like round segments. More modern female jewellery included patsyory (a necklace made by wrapping several strings of hollow glass beads around the neck), coral and porcelain bead necklaces, often worn with another string with three small icons, mendeli (Ukrainian: менделі); gerdanas (Ukrainian: ґердани), narrow seed bead woven necklaces and other items. Unmarried women decorated their necklaces with ribbons.

Male adornments were simpler: small metal buttons with glass centres that were sewn to the shirt.

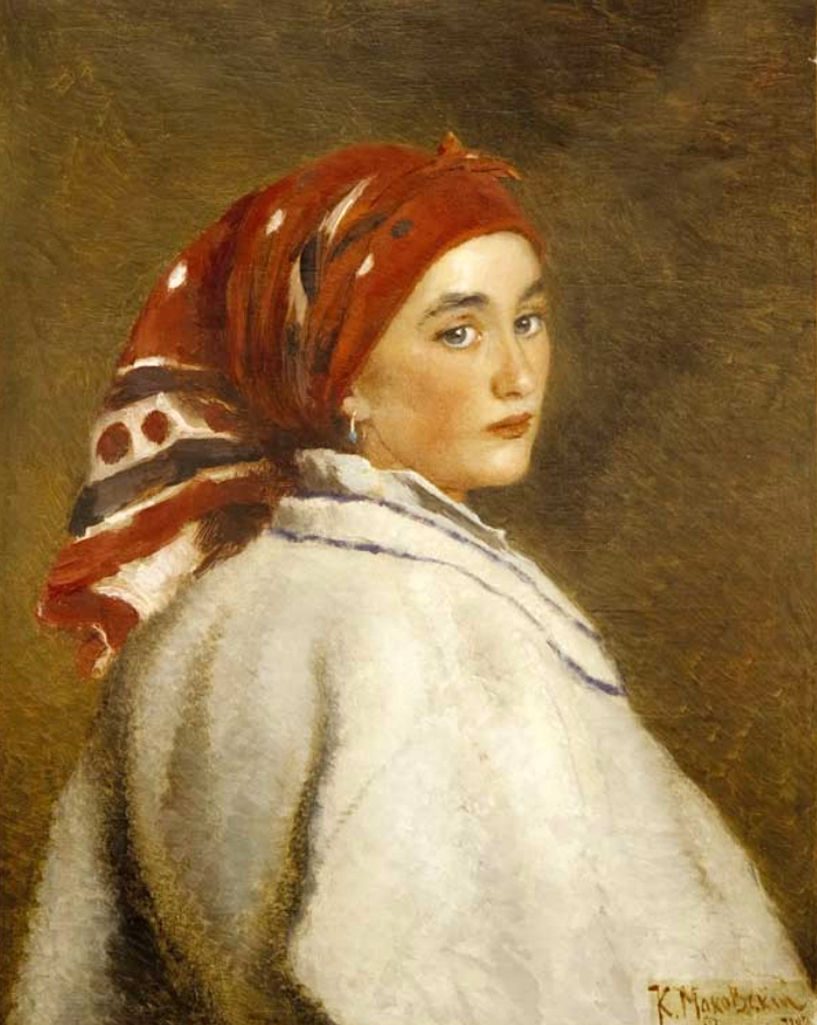
Peasant from Volhynia, Konstantin Makovsky.

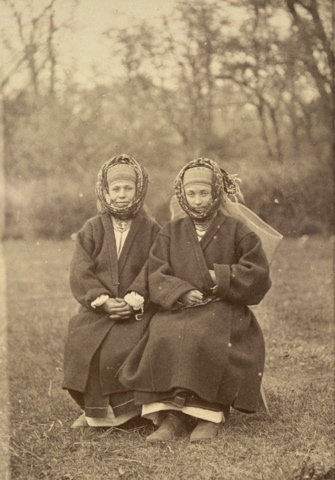
Wimple with kerchief. Podillya.

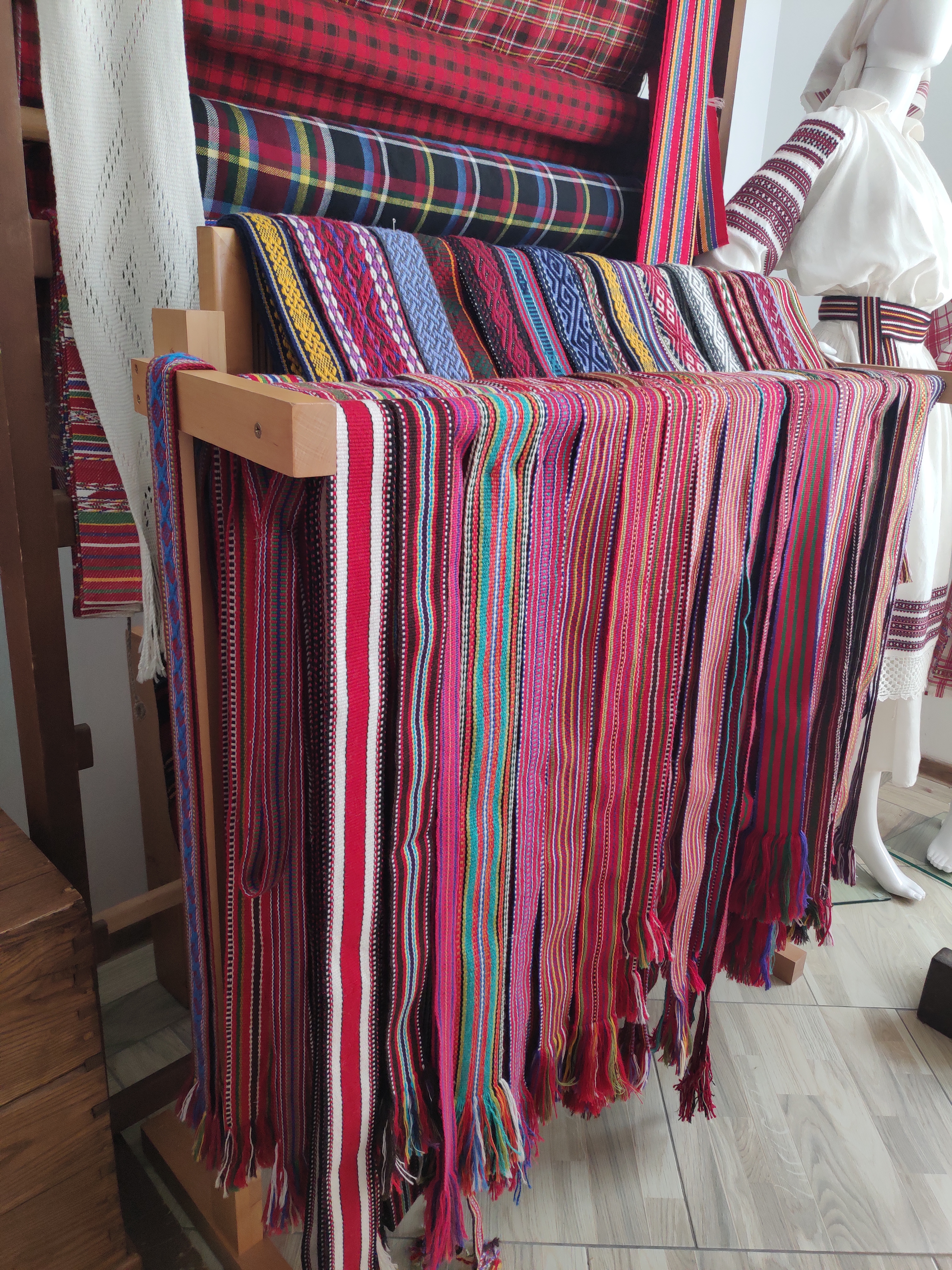
Women's sashes from Rivne.
