= Edmund Różycki =

Polish general

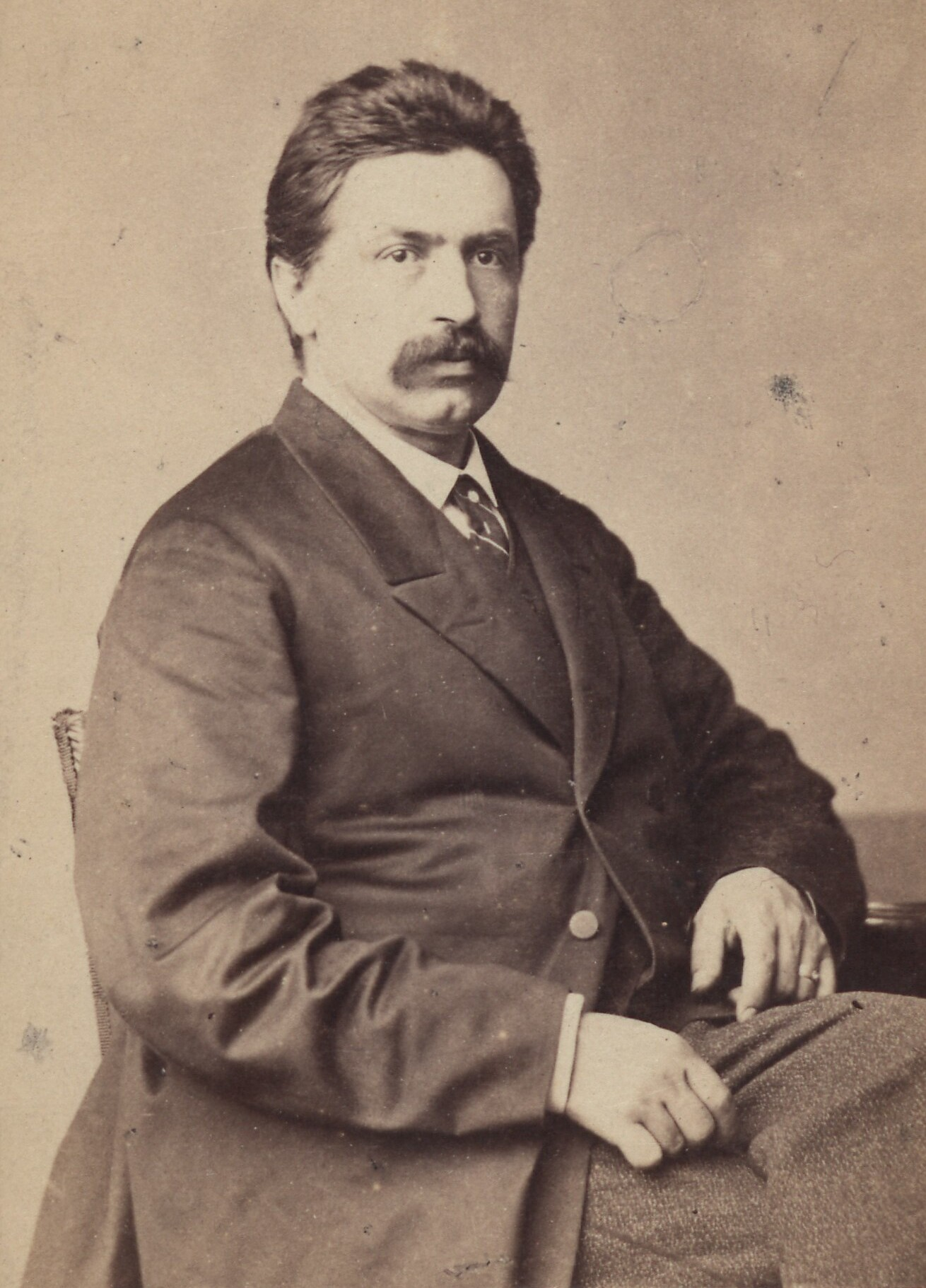
Edmund Różycki.

Edmund Różycki (January 13, 1827, in Volhynia – May 23, 1893, in Kraków) was a Polish general in the January Uprising, and the overall commander of the uprising in Volhynia and Podolia. He was also an officer in the Tsarist army.

He was notable for being called "Bat’ko" (Ukrainian for father) by his troops, and marching into battle singing Ukrainian songs.
