= Volhynia =

Historical region in Central and Eastern Europe

Volhynia: Волинь; Wołyń; Volynia
- Historical region
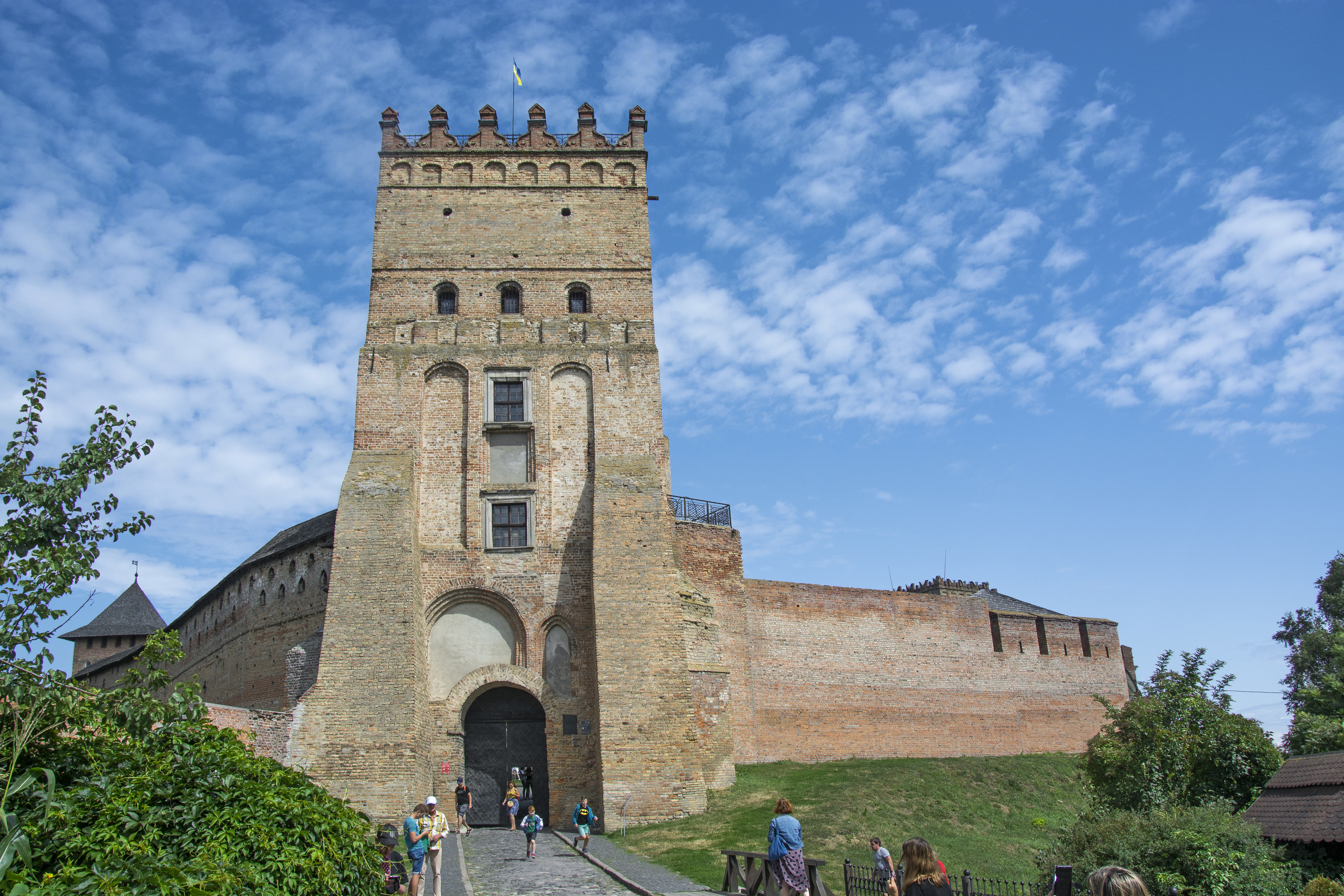
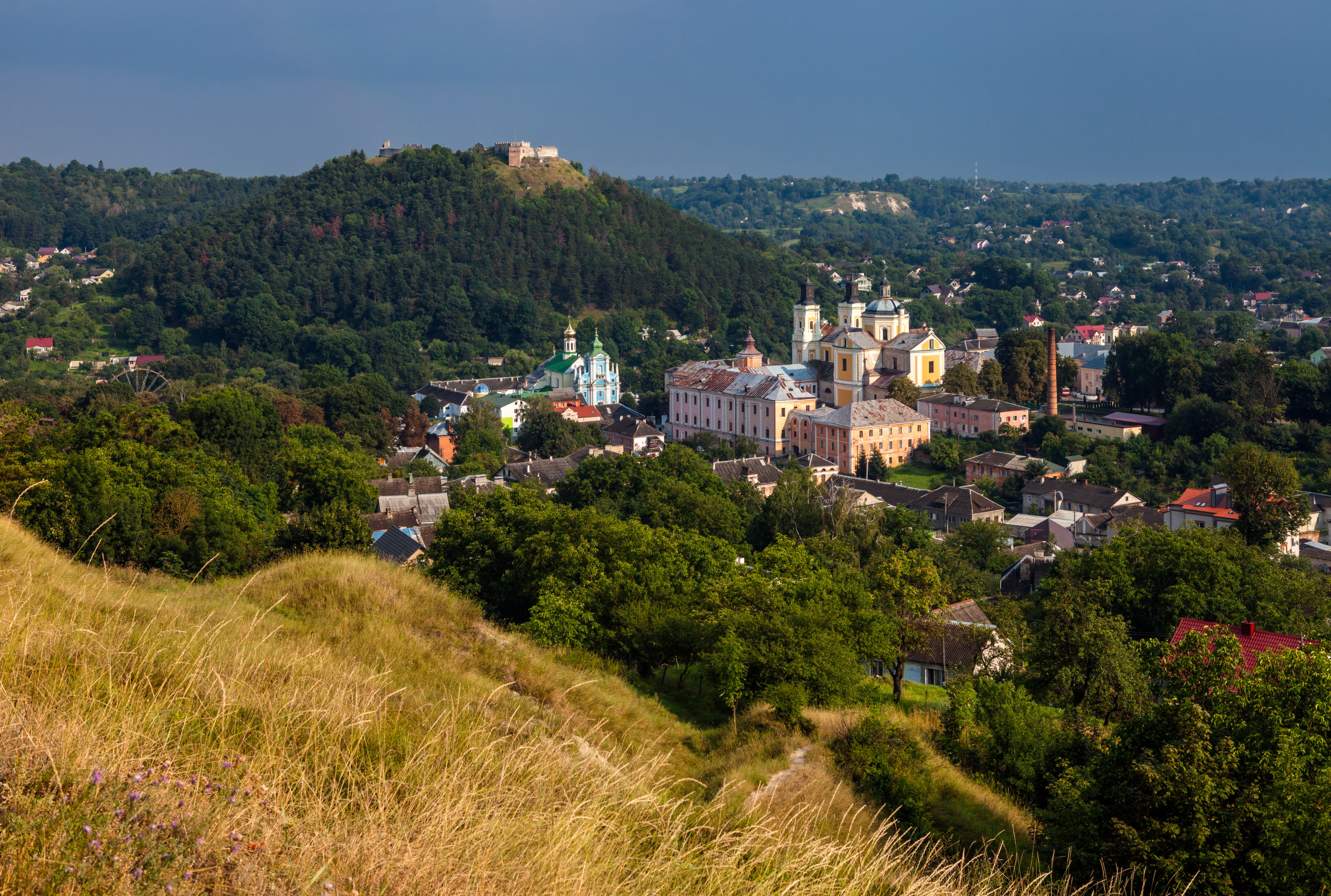
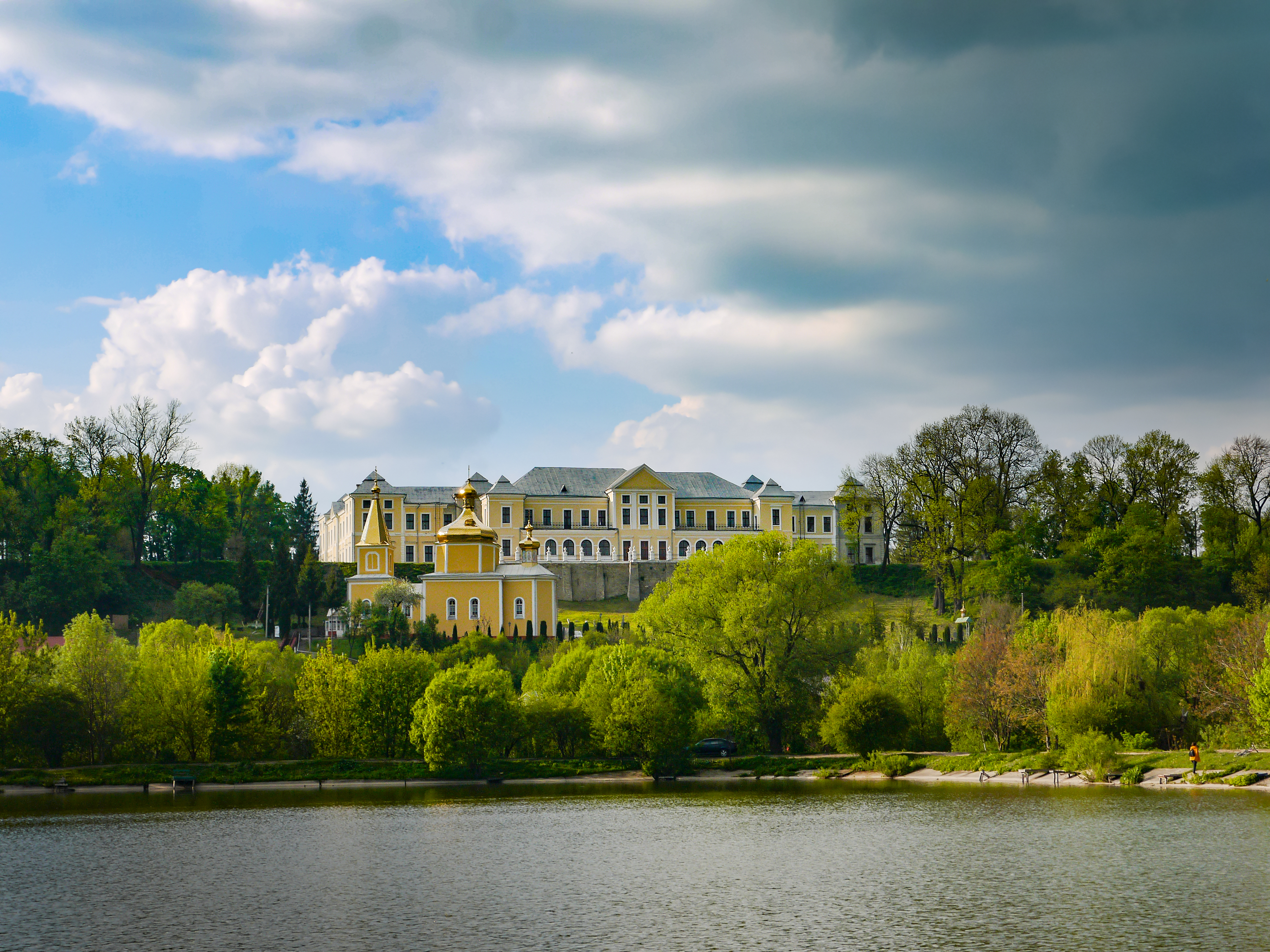
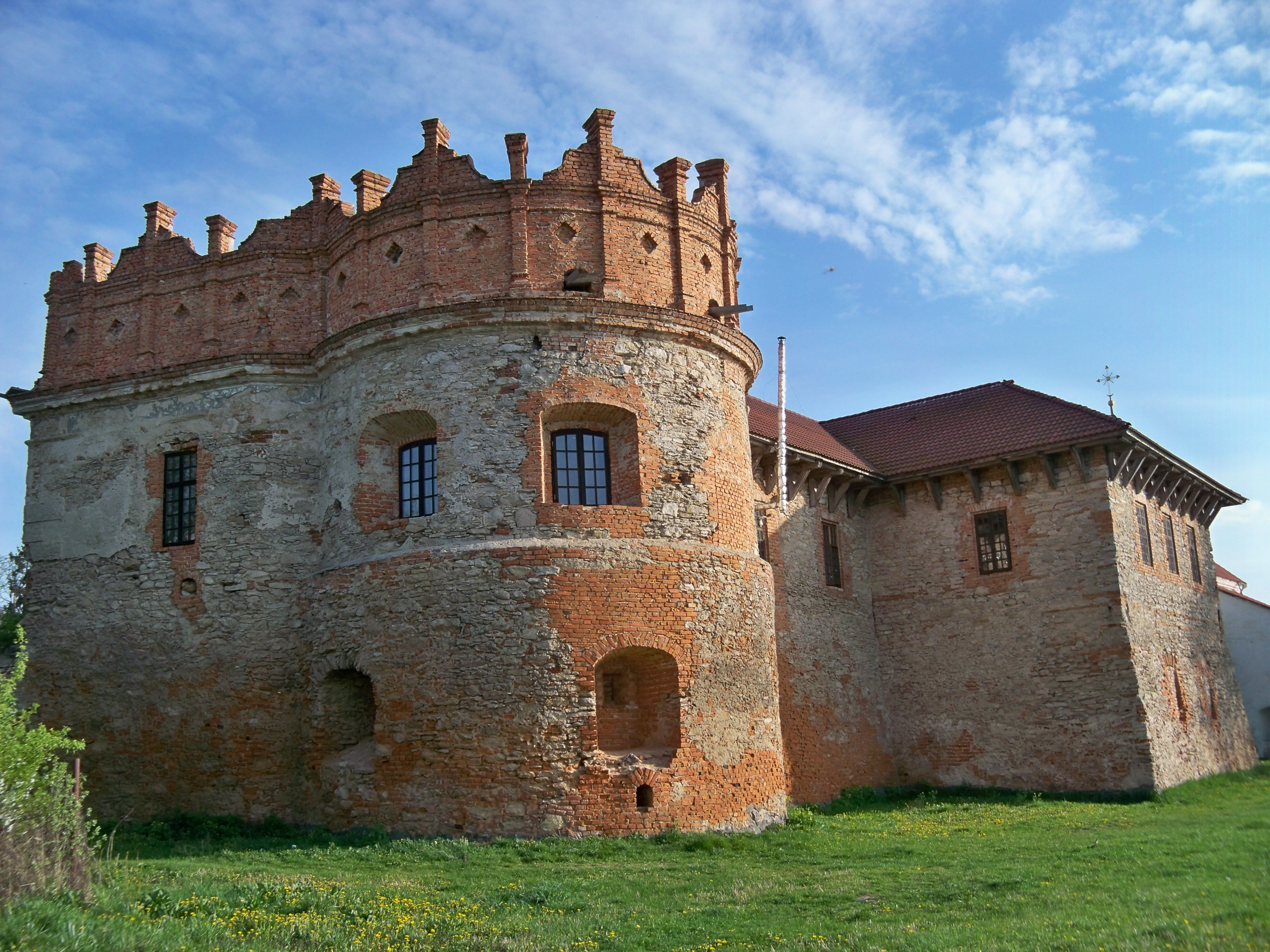
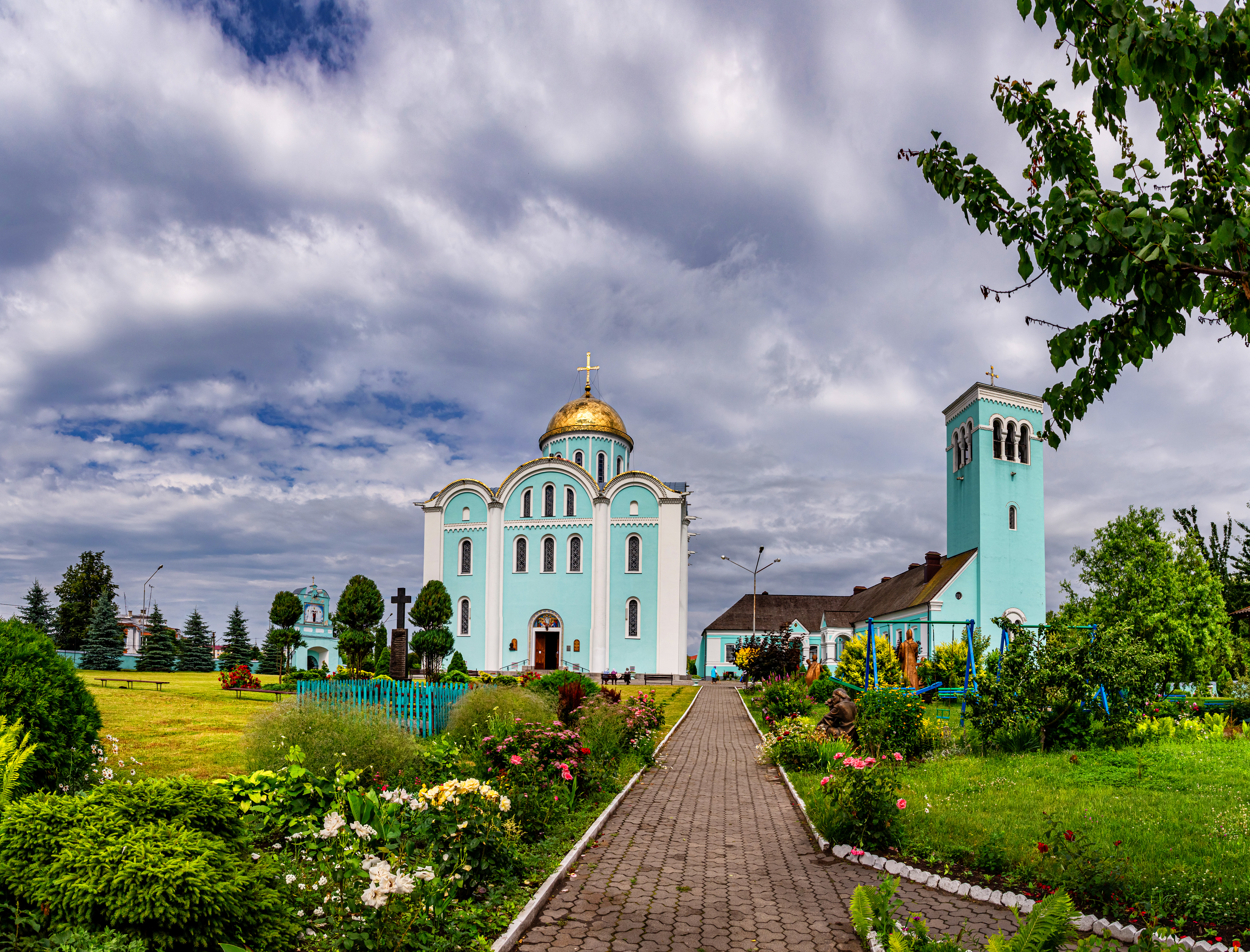
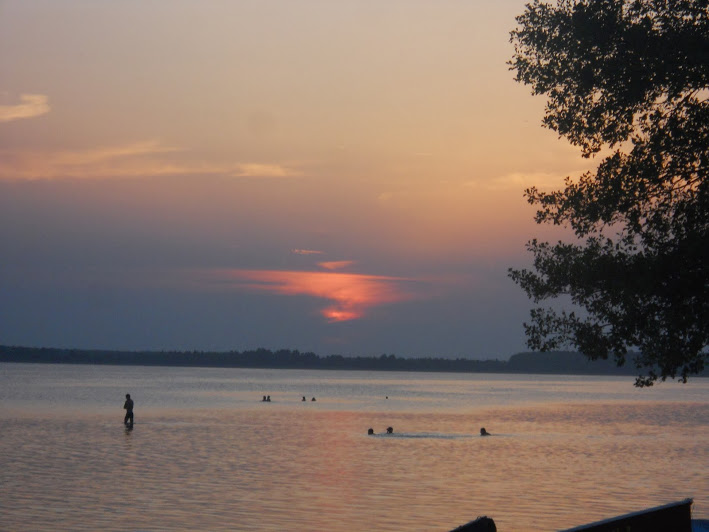
- From top, left to right: Lubart's Castle in Lutsk; Kremenets; Vyshnivets Palace; Starokostiantyniv Castle; Dormition Cathedral in Volodymyr; Lake Svitiaz

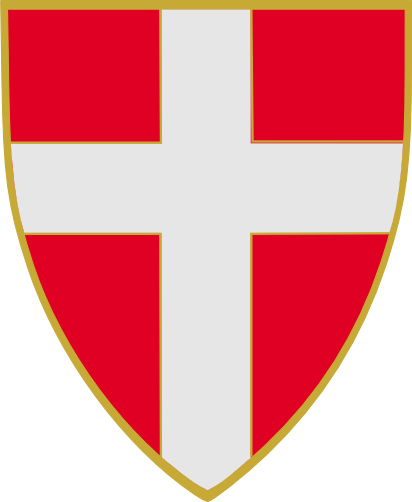
- Coat of arms

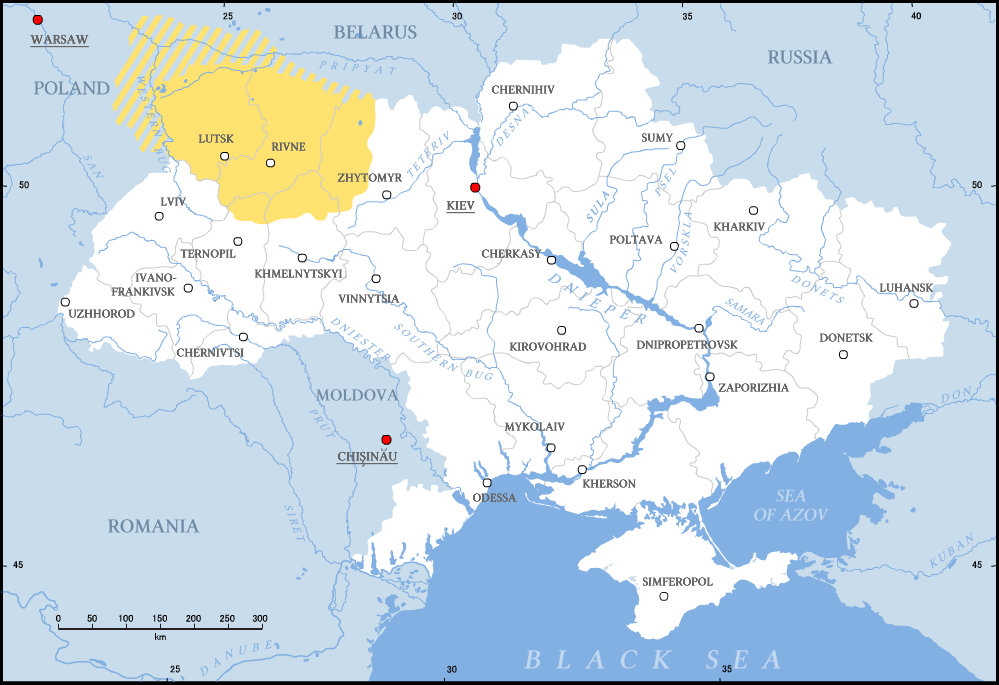
- Location of Volhynia (yellow) in Ukraine
- Coordinates: 50°44′20″N 25°19′24″E
- Country: Poland; Belarus; Ukraine
- Region: Southeastern Poland, Southwestern Belarus, Western Ukraine
- Parts: Volyn Oblast, Rivne Oblast, Zhytomyr Oblast, Ternopil Oblast, Khmelnytskyi Oblast, Lublin Voivodeship, Brest Region
- Demonym: Volhynian

Volhynia or Volynia (/voʊˈlɪniə/ voh-LIN-ee-ə; see #Names and etymology) is a historic region in Central and Eastern Europe, between southeastern Poland, southwestern Belarus, and northwestern Ukraine. The borders of the region are not clearly defined, but in Ukraine it is roughly equivalent to Volyn Oblast, Rivne Oblast, western part of Zhytomyr Oblast and the northern parts of the Khmelnytskyi Oblast and Ternopil Oblast. The territory that still carries the name is Volyn Oblast.

Volhynia has changed hands numerous times throughout history and been divided among competing powers. For centuries it was part of the Polish-Lithuanian Commonwealth. After the Russian annexation during the Partitions of Poland, all of Volhynia was made part of the Pale of Settlement on the southwestern border of the Russian Empire. Important cities include Rivne, Lutsk, Zviahel, and Volodymyr.

== Names and etymology ==
- Ukrainian: Волинь, romanized: Volynʹ, pronounced [woˈlɪnʲ];
- Polish: Wołyń [ˈvɔwɨɲ];
- Russian: Волынь, romanized: Volynʹ, pronounced [vɐˈlɨnʲ];
- Lithuanian: Voluinė or Volynė;
- Slovak: Volyňa;
- Czech: Volyň [ˈvolɪɲ];
- Romanian: Volînia or Volânia;
- Hungarian: Volhínia;
- German: Wolhynien or Wolynien (both [voˈlyːni̯ən]); Volhynian German: Wolhynien, Wolhinien, Wolynien or Wolinien (all [voˈliːni̯ən]);
- Yiddish: װאָהלין, romanized: Vohlin, or װאָלין, Volin.

The alternative name for the region is Lodomeria (Ukrainian: Володимирія), after the city of Volodymyr, which was once a political capital of the medieval Volhynian Principality.

According to some historians, the region is named after a semi-legendary city of Volin or Velin, said to have been located on the Southern Bug River, whose name may come from the Proto-Slavic root *vol/vel- 'wet'. In other versions, the city was located over 20 km (12 mi) to the west of Volodymyr near the mouth of the Huczwa River, a tributary of the Western Bug.

== Geography ==
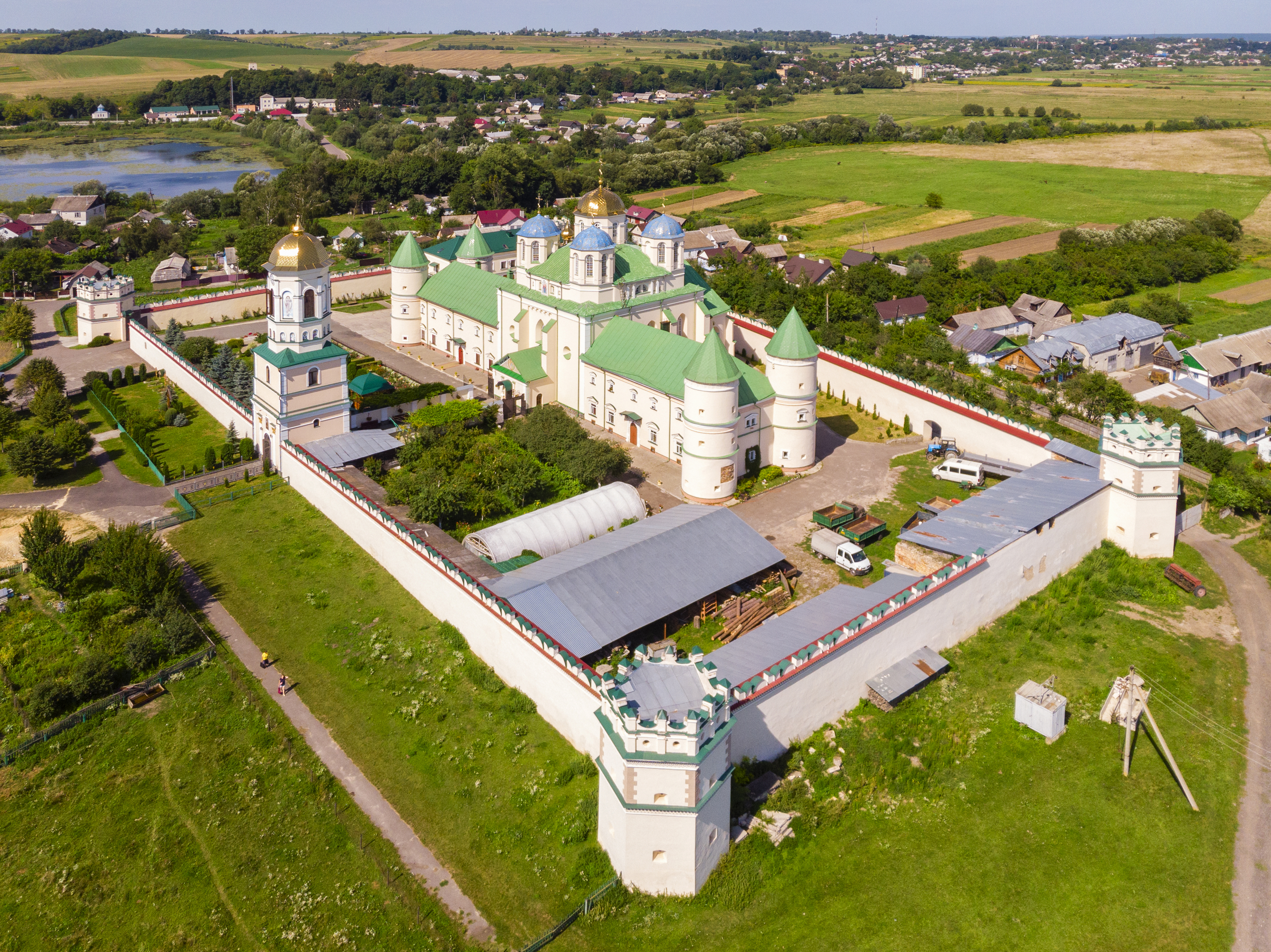
Mezhyrich Abbey in Ostroh was endowed by the Ostrogski princes in the 15th century.

Geographically it occupies northern areas of the Volhynian-Podolian Upland and western areas of Polesian Lowland along the Pripyat valley as part of the vast East European Plain, between the Western Bug in the west and upper streams of Uzh and Teteriv rivers. Before the partitions of Poland, the eastern edge stretched a little west along the right-banks of the Sluch River or just east of it. Within the territory of Volhynia is located Little Polisie, a lowland that actually divides the Volhynian-Podolian Upland into separate Volhynian Upland and northern outskirts of Podolian Upland, the so-called Kremenets Hills. Volhynia is located in the basins of the Western Bug and Pripyat, therefore most of its rivers flow either in a northern or a western direction.

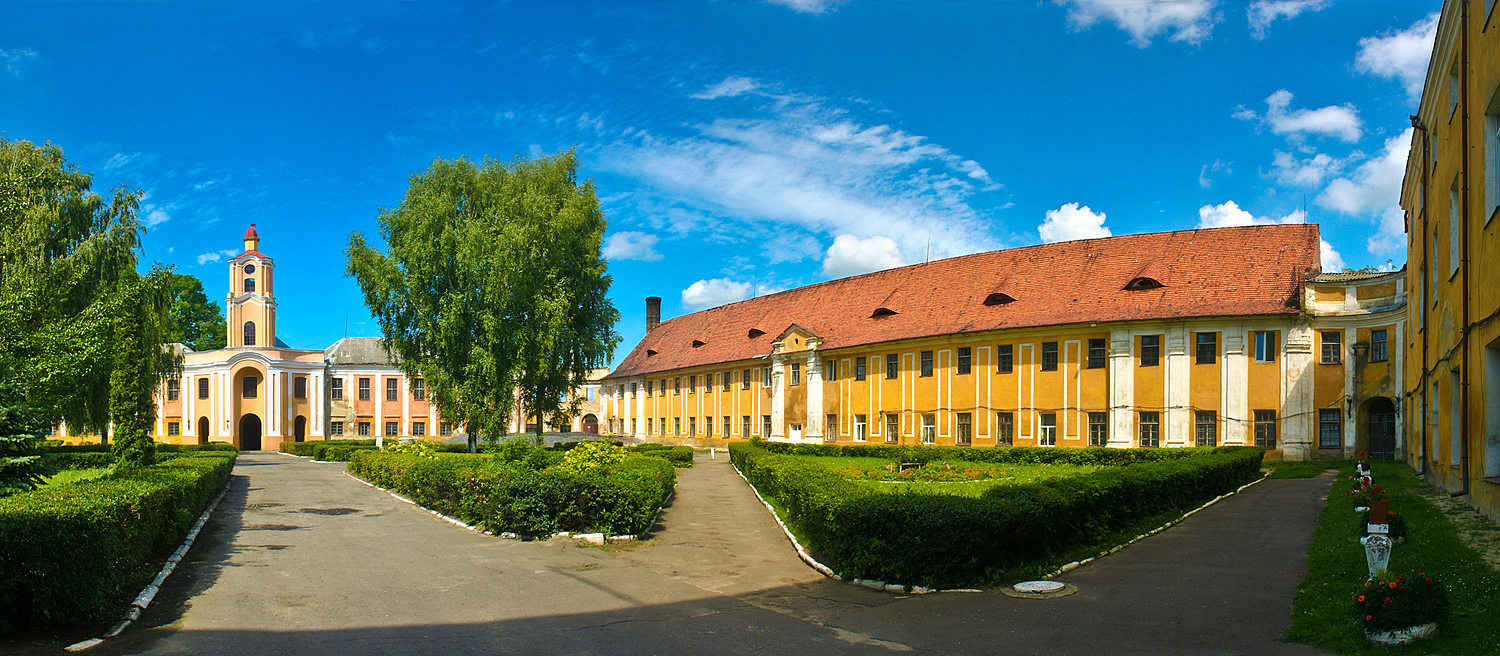
Olyka Castle

Relative to other historical regions, it is northeast of Galicia, east of Lesser Poland and northwest of Podolia. The borders of the region are not clearly defined, and it is often considered to overlap a number of other regions, among which are Polesia and Podlasie.

The territories of historical Volhynia are now part of the Volyn, Rivne and parts of the Zhytomyr, Ternopil and Khmelnytskyi oblasts of Ukraine, as well as parts of Poland (see Chełm). Major cities include Lutsk, Rivne, Kovel, Volodymyr, Kremenets (Ternopil Oblast) and Starokostiantyniv (Khmelnytskyi Oblast). Before World War II, many Jewish shtetls (small towns), such as Trochenbrod and Lozisht, were an integral part of the region. At one time all of Volhynia was part of the Pale of Settlement designated by Imperial Russia on its southwesternmost border.

== History ==
The first records can be traced to the Old East Slavic chronicles, such as the Primary Chronicle, which mentions tribes of the Dulebes, Buzhans and Volhynians. The land was mentioned in the works of Al-Masudi and Abraham ben Jacob that in ancient times the Walitābā and king Mājik, which some read as Walīnānā and identified with the Volhynians, were "the original, pure-blooded Saqaliba, the most highly honoured" and dominated the rest of the Slavic tribes, but due to "dissent" their "original organization was destroyed" and "the people divided into factions, each of them ruled by their own king", implying existence of a Slavic federation which perished after the attack of the Pannonian Avars.

Volhynia may have been included in (or was in the sphere of influence of) the Kievan Rus' as early as the tenth century. At that time Princess Olga sent a punitive raid against the Drevlians to avenge the death of her husband Grand Prince Igor (Ingvar Röreksson); she later established pogosts along the Luha River. In the opinion of the Ukrainian historian Yuriy Dyba, the chronicle phrase «и оустави по мьстѣ. погосты и дань. и по лузѣ погосты и дань и ѡброкы» (and established in place pogosts and tribute along Luha), the path of pogosts and tribute reflects the actual route of Olga's raid against the Drevlians further to the west, up to the Western Bug's right tributary Luha River.

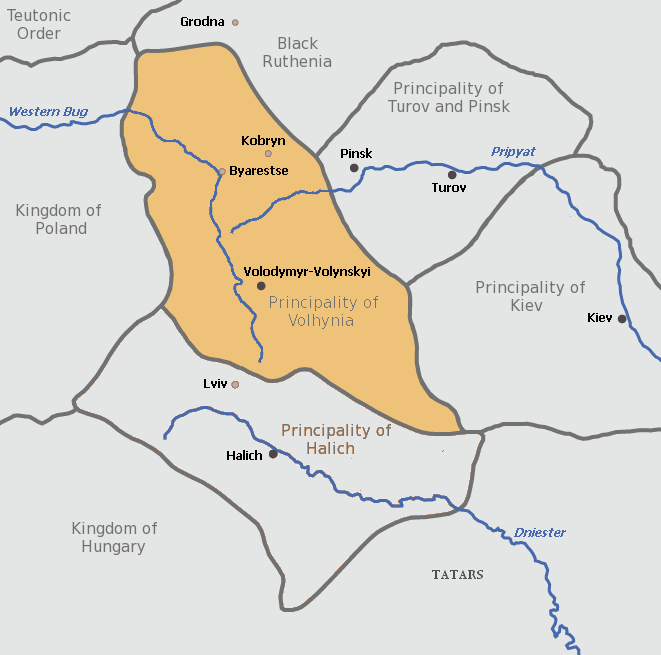
Principality of Volhynia in the 12th century

As early as 983, Vladimir the Great appointed his son Vsevolod as the ruler of the Volhynian principality. In 988, he established the city of Volodymer (Володимѣръ). Since the late 12th century, history of the Volhynia is closely connected with that of the neighboring Principality of Galicia. These two successor states of the Kievan Rus' formed the united Galicia–Volhynia polity, on several occasions between the late 12th and the 14th centuries. They were united firstly under prince Roman the Great (1199-1205), but disintegrated already during the War of the Galician Succession (1205–1245). Upon interfering in Galician-Volhynian affairs, Hungarian king Andrew II (1205-1235) took the title King of Galicia and Lodomeria, thus expressing his pretensions on the supreme rule over both Galicia and Lodomeria (Volhynia). Once included among the lands of the Hungarian Crown, those titles were used by Hungarian kings up to 1918.

Volhynian Voivodeship within the Polish–Lithuanian Commonwealth

After the disintegration of the Galicia–Volhynia circa 1340, the Kingdom of Poland and the Grand Duchy of Lithuania divided the region, Poland taking western Volhynia and Lithuania taking eastern Volhynia (1352–1366). During this period many Poles and Jews settled in the area. The Roman and Greek Catholic churches became established in the province. In 1375, a Roman Catholic Diocese of Lodomeria was established, but it was suppressed in 1425. Many Orthodox churches joined the latter organization in order to benefit from a more attractive legal status. Records of the first agricultural colonies of Mennonites, religious refugees of Dutch, Frisian and German background, date from 1783. After 1569, Volhynia was organized as a voivodeship within the larger Lesser Poland Province of the Polish–Lithuanian Commonwealth. Future Polish King Michał Korybut Wiśniowiecki spent a part of childhood in Volhynia.

=== Late modern period ===
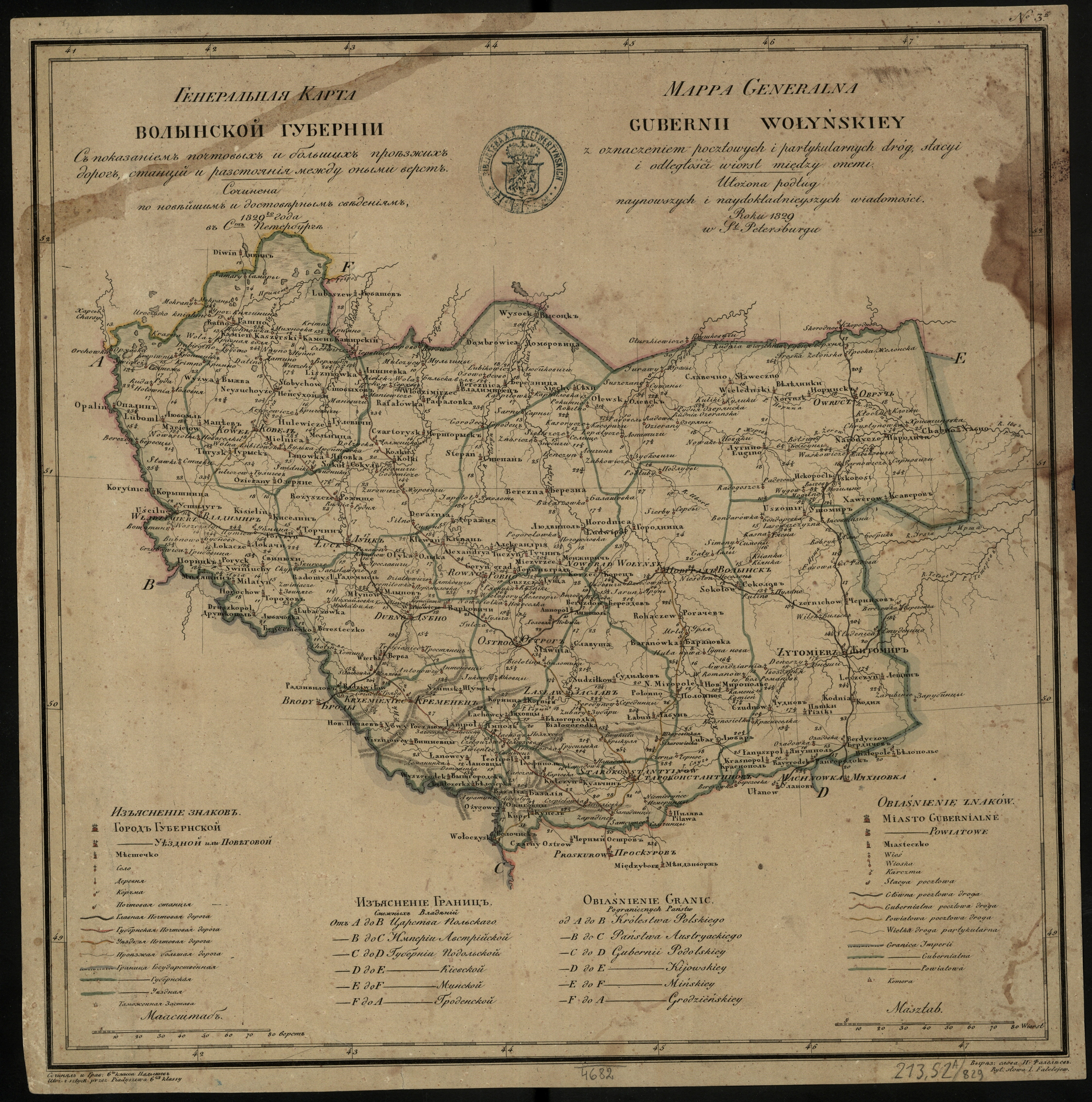
Volhynia Governorate - Pâdyšev, Vasilij Pietrovič (1829) with the capital Zhytomir and including district cities Kovel, Lutsk, Kremenets, Dubno, Volodymyr, Zaslav, Rivne, Starokostiantyniv, Ostroh and Ovruch.

A small south-western part of the historical Volhynia (with the city of Belz) was annexed by Austria in the First Partition of Poland in 1772, and included into the newly created Kingdom of Galicia and Lodomeria (with Lodomera representing Volhynia), while the rest of Volhynia reamined within the Polish kingdom. In 1783, a porcelain factory was founded in Korzec by Józef Klemens Czartoryski.

After the Third Partition of Poland in 1795, eastern and central parts Volhynia were annexed as the Volhynian Governorate of the Russian Empire, while the most western parts of the historical Volhynia were incorporated into the newly formed Habsburg province of West Galicia. It was planned to make Zviahel the new capital of the region, but eventually its centre was transferred to Zhytomyr.

The Volhynian Governorate covered an area of 71,852.7 square kilometres. Following its annexation, the Russian government greatly changed the religious make-up of the area: it forcibly liquidated the Ukrainian Greek Catholic Church, transferring all of its buildings to the ownership and control of the Russian Orthodox Church. Many Roman Catholic church buildings were also given to the Russian Church. The Roman Catholic Diocese of Lutsk was suppressed by order of Empress Catherine II.

As part of the schooling reform of the early 19th century, an educational district was established in Volhynia under the supervision of Adam Jerzy Czartoryski, headed by Tadeusz Czacki. As a result, Kremenets Lyceum and a network of Polish schools were created in the region, constributing to the increased prestige of Polish language and culture among local inhabitants. Several battles of the Polish Uprising of 1863 against Russia were fought in the region, including the Battle of Salicha.

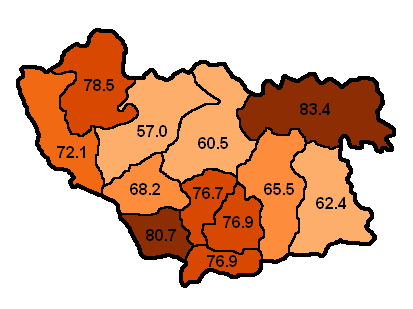
Percentage of Ukrainian-speakers in the uezds of the Volhynia Governorate according to the 1897 census.

In 1897, the population amounted to 2,989,482 people (41.7 per square kilometre). It consisted of 73.7 percent East Slavs (predominantly Ukrainians), 13.2 percent—400,000 Jews, 6.2 percent Poles, and 5.7 percent Germans. Most of the German settlers had immigrated from Congress Poland. A small number of Czech settlers also had migrated here. Their main regional center was Kvasyliv. Although economically the area was developing rather quickly, upon the eve of the First World War it was still the most rural province in Western Russian Empire.

=== World War I ===
During World War I, Volhynia was the place of several battles, fought by the Austrians, Germans and the Polish Legions against Russia, eg. the Battle of Kostiuchnówka. Ukrainian Sich Riflemen, who were stationed in the region during the war, noted the weak national identity of local majority, many of whom would identify as "Rus" or "Little Russian" rather than Ukrainian. In order to alleviate this situation, numerous Ukrainian schools were created in Volhynia by the riflemen's command.

After the 1917 February Revolution and the formation of the Russian Provisional Government, Ukrainian nationalists declared the autonomous Ukrainian People's Republic. The territory of Volhynia was split in half by a frontline just west of the city of Lutsk. Due to an invasion of the Bolsheviks, the government of Ukraine was forced to retreat to Volhynia after the sack of Kyiv. Military aid from the Central Powers as a result of the Treaty of Brest-Litovsk brought peace in the region and some degree of stability. Until the end of the war, the area saw a revival of Ukrainian culture after years of Russian oppression and the denial of Ukrainian traditions. After German troops were withdrawn, the whole region was engulfed by a new wave of military actions by Poles and Russians competing for control of the territory. The Ukrainian People's Army was forced to fight on three fronts: Bolsheviks, Poles and the Russian Volunteer Army.

=== Interwar period ===
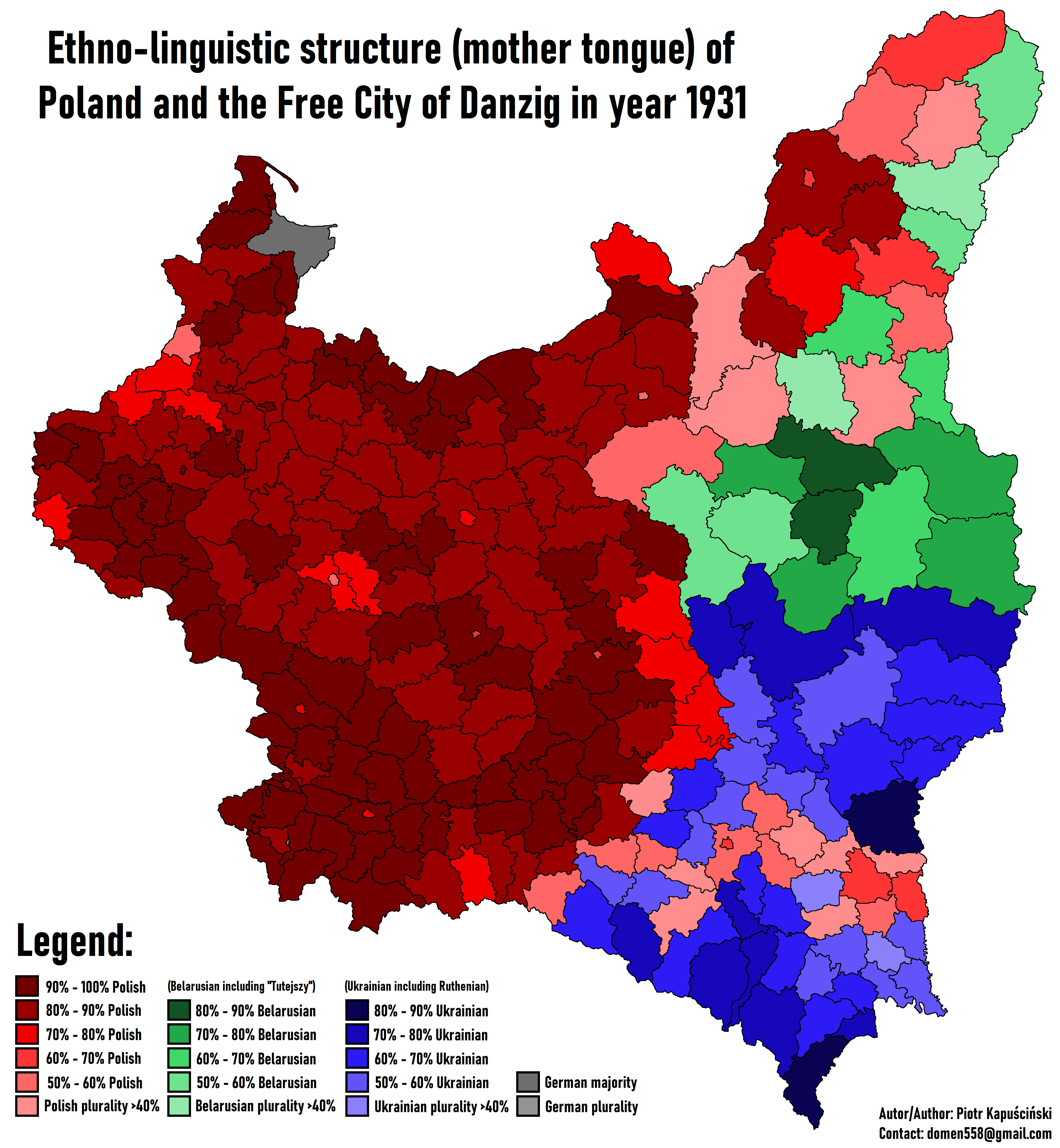
Ukrainian-speakers constituted an absolute majority of the population in all powiats of the Wołyń Voivodeship according to the 1931 Polish census.

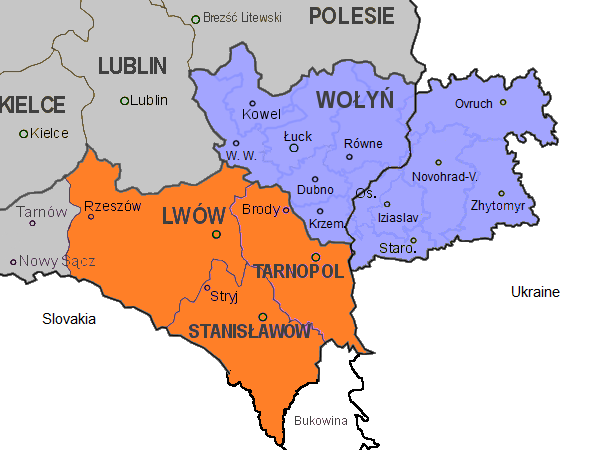
Map of divided Volhynia (blue) between Ukrainian and Polish (Wołyń) part, and Eastern Galicia (orange) in 1939

In 1919, Volhynia became part of the Polish-controlled Volhynian District. The decision to annex the region to Poland was taken by the Polish National Committee under the leadership of Roman Dmowski. In 1921, after the end of the Polish–Soviet War, the treaty known as the Peace of Riga divided Volhynia between Poland and the Soviet Union, with Poland retaining the larger part, in which the Volhynian Voivodeship was established with the capital in Łuck, and the largest city being Równe.

Starting from 1921, mass settlement of Polish soldiers (osadniks) started in the region with the support of authorities, which organized purchase of landholdings for that goal. By 1937, around 100,000 Polish settlers resided in the area. However, the Polish population had little contact with the Ukrainian majority, which prevented any significant Polonization of native inhabitants.

Most of eastern Volhynian Governorate became part of the Ukrainian SSR, eventually being split into smaller districts. During that period, a number of the Marchlewszczyzna Polish national districts was formed in the Soviet-controlled part of Volhynia. In 1931, the Vatican of the Roman Catholic Church established a Ukrainian Catholic Apostolic Exarchate of Volhynia, Polesia and Pidliashia, where the congregation practiced the Byzantine Rite in Ukrainian language.

From 1935 to 1938, the government of the Soviet Union deported numerous nationals from Volhynia in a population transfer to Siberia and Central Asia, as part of the dekulakization, an effort to suppress peasant farmers in the region. These people included Poles of Eastern Volhynia (see Population transfer in the Soviet Union).

=== World War II ===
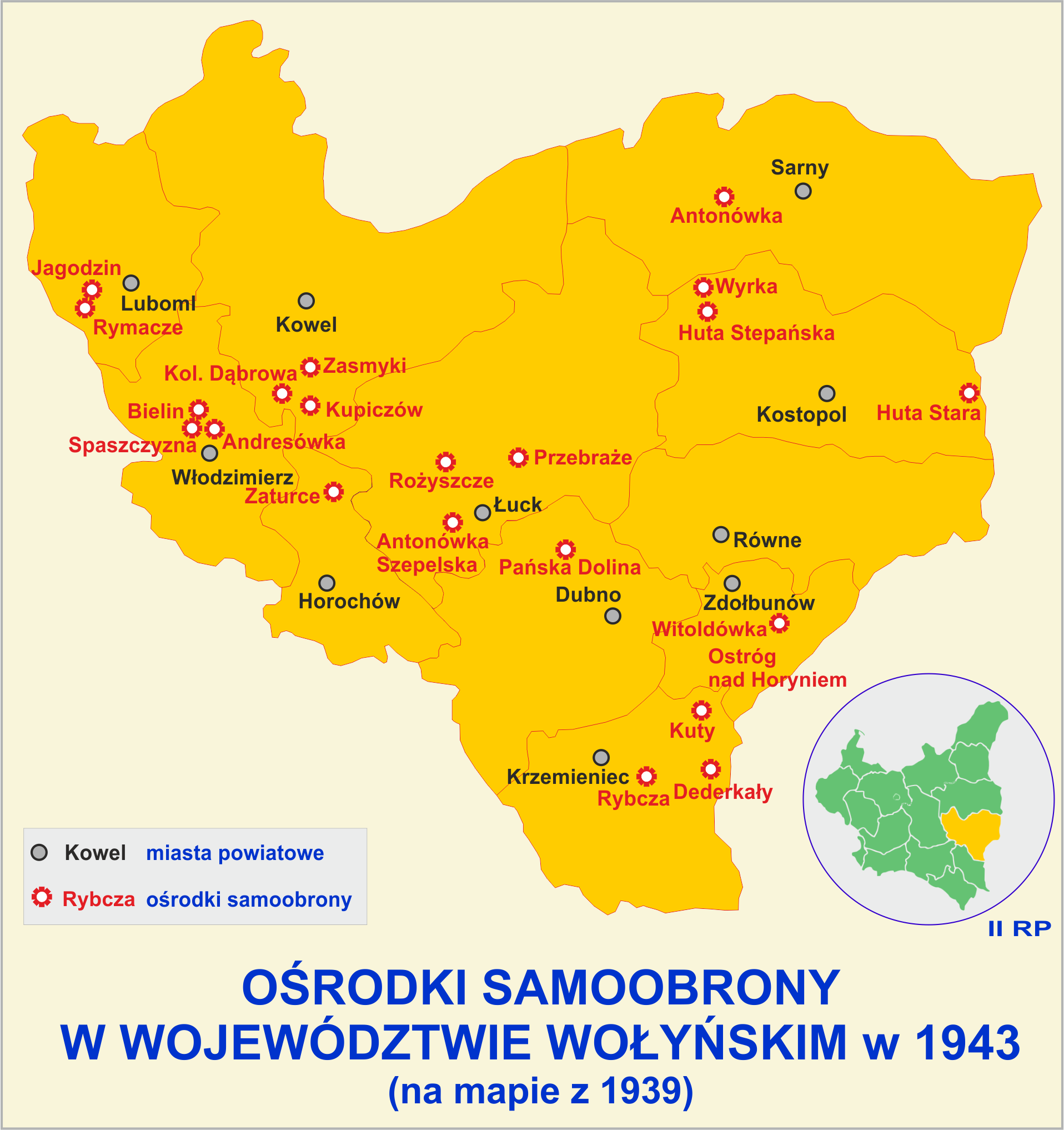
Polish self-defense centres in pre-war Polish Volhynia during German occupation in 1943

Following the signing of the Molotov–Ribbentrop Pact in 1939, and the subsequent invasion and division of Polish territories between the Reich and the USSR, the Soviet Union invaded and occupied the Polish part of Volhynia. In the course of the Nazi–Soviet population transfers which followed this (temporary) German-Soviet alliance, most of the ethnic German-minority population of Volhynia were transferred to those Polish areas annexed by Nazi Germany. Following the mass deportations and arrests carried out by the NKVD, and repressive actions against Poles taken by Germany, including deportation to the Reich to forced labour camps, arrests, detention in camps and mass executions, by 1943 ethnic Poles constituted only 10–12% of the entire population of Volhynia.

During the German invasion, the Germans operated the Stalag 346, Stalag 357 and Stalag 360 prisoner-of-war camps in Volhynia. Most of the region's Jewish population of approximately 460,000 was shot as part of the Holocaust perpetrated by Germans and local collaborators, with victims being buried in large pits. The main massacre took place between August and October 1942. It is estimated that about 1.5% survived the Holocaust.

In 1943, up to 100,000 Poles in Volhynia were massacred by the Ukrainian Insurgent Army. The number of Ukrainian victims of Polish retaliatory attacks in the region until the spring of 1945 is estimated at approx. 2,000−3,000.

The Soviet Union annexed Volhynia to Soviet Ukraine after the end of World War II. In 1944, the communists in Volhynia suppressed the Ukrainian Catholic Apostolic Exarchate. Ethnic Germans were expelled from Volhynia following the end of the war, claiming that Nazi Germany had used them as part of its Generalplan Ost. The expulsion of Germans from eastern Europe was part of broader mass population transfers after the war. Most of the remaining ethnic Polish population were expelled to Poland in 1945. Since the dissolution of the Soviet Union in the 1990s, Volhynia has been an integral part of Ukraine.

== Important relics ==
- Peresopnytsia Gospel

== Gallery ==
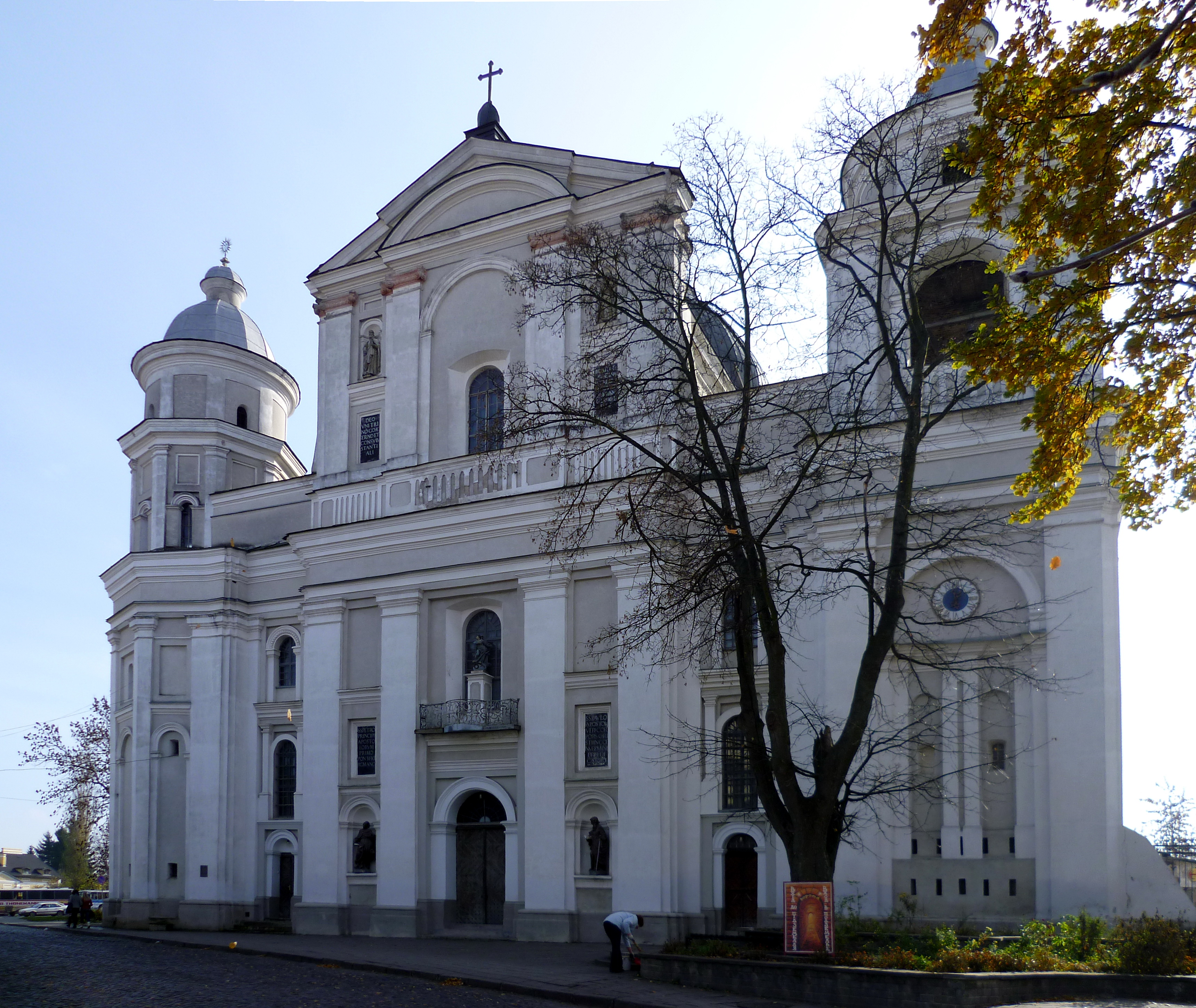
Saint Peter and Paul Cathedral, Lutsk

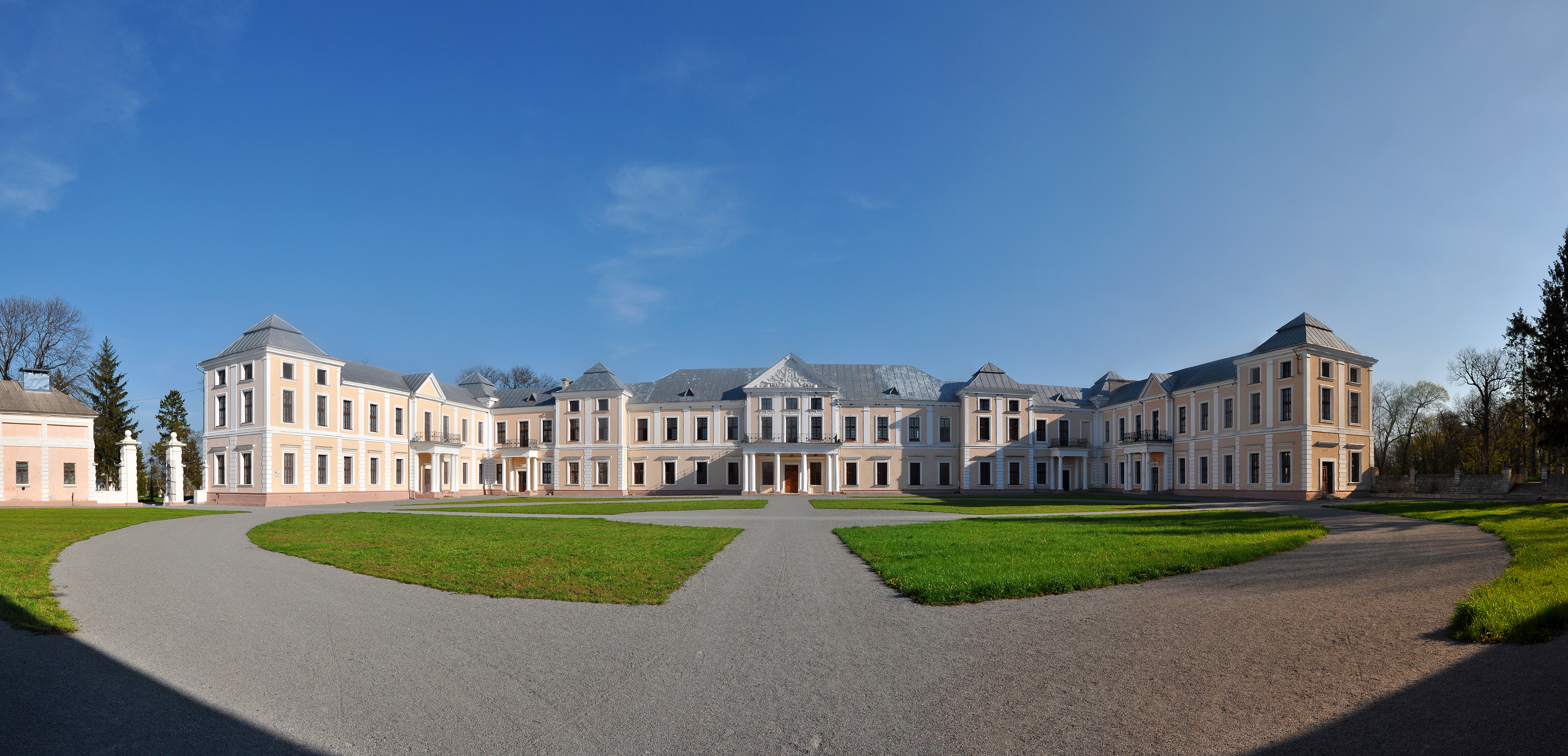
Vyshnivets Palace

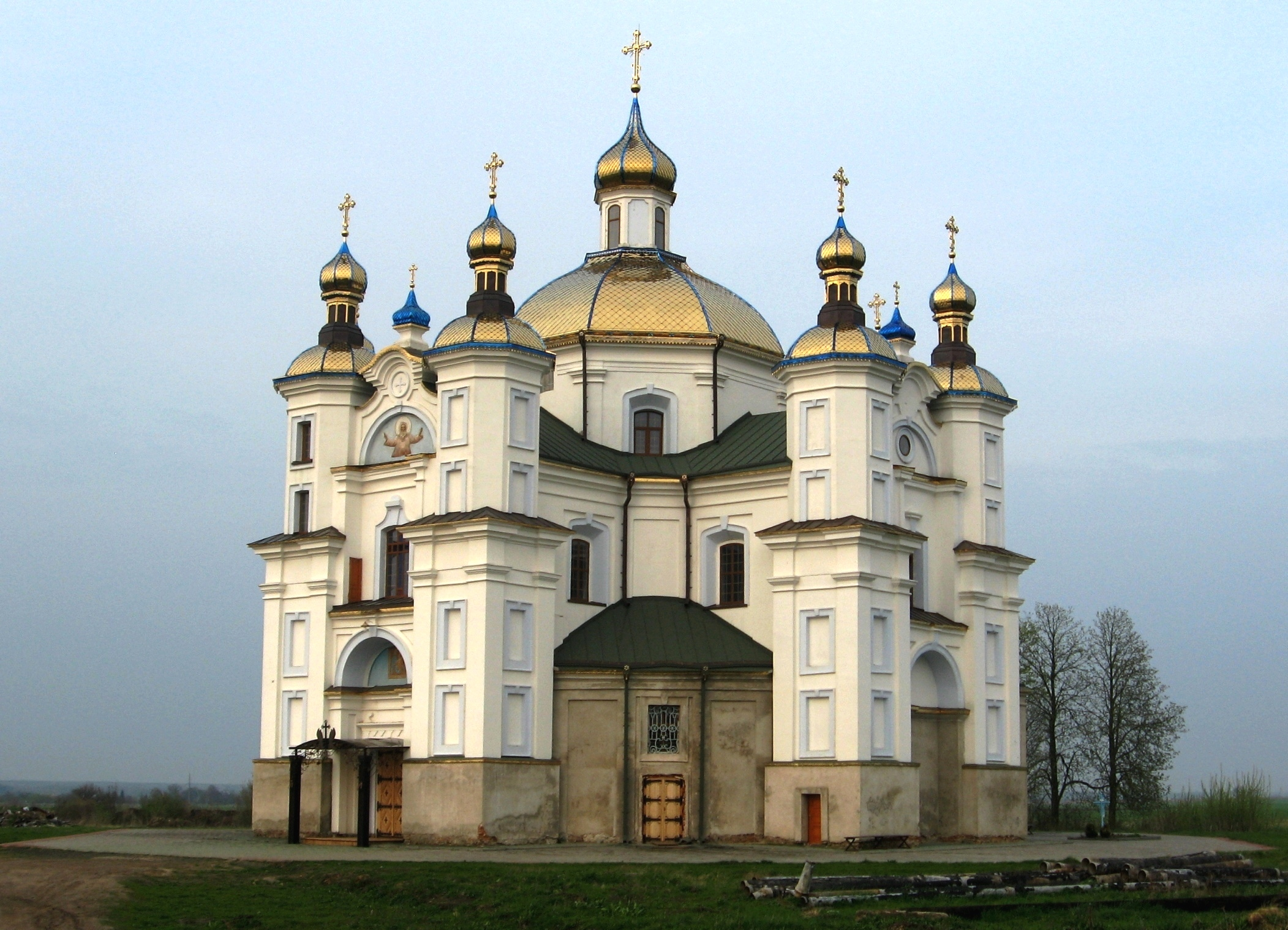
Church of the Intercession in Piddubtsi

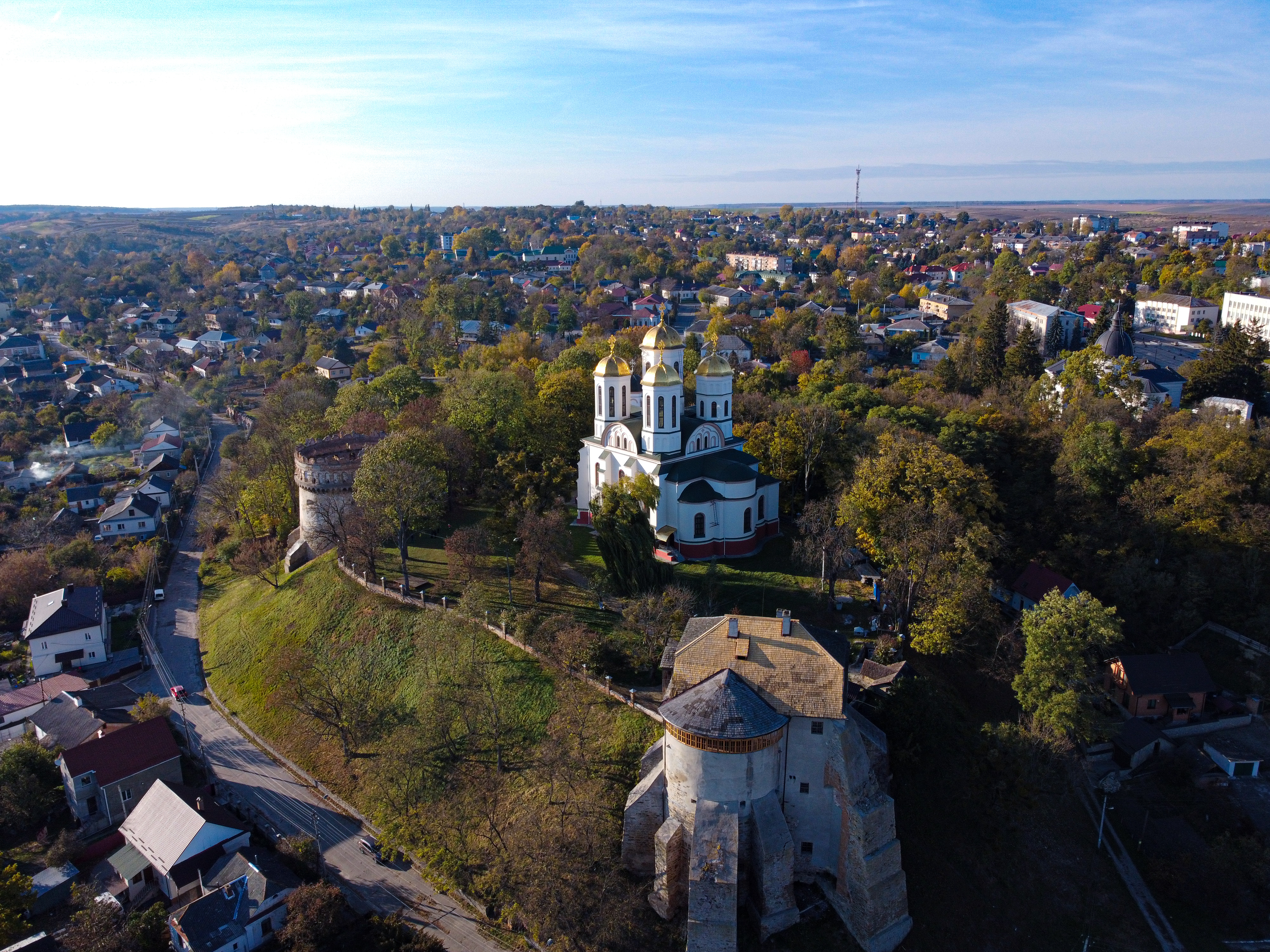
Ostroh Castle

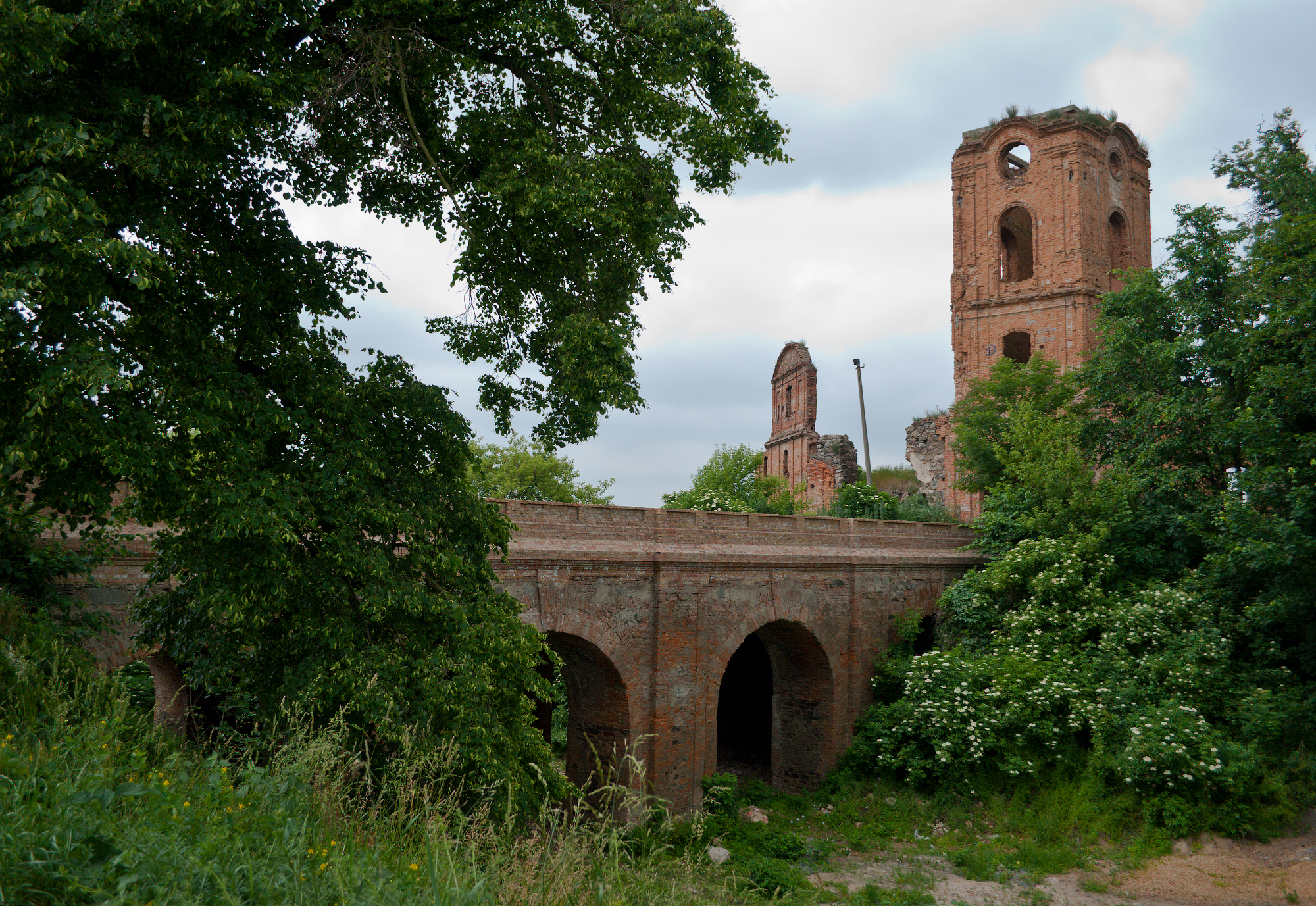
Korets Castle ruins

== See also ==
- Volhynians
- Principality of Volhynia
- Kingdom of Galicia–Volhynia
- Volhynian Voivodeship (1569–1795)
- Volhynian folk costume
- Ostrogski family

== Sources ==
- Andriyashev, Alexander (1887). Очерк истории Волынской земли [Essay on the History of Volyn land] Archived 2022-08-09 at the Wayback Machine (in Russian) at Runivers.ru in Djvu and PDF formats. Kyiv: Imperial University of Saint Vladimir.
- Ciancia, Kathryn (September 2017). "Borderland Modernity: Poles, Jews, and Urban Spaces in Interwar Eastern Poland". The Journal of Modern History. 89 (3): 531–561. doi:10.1086/692992. S2CID 149342133.
- Font, Márta (2012). "Principles and Methods in the Policy of the Hungarian King, Andreas II concerning the Galician-Volhynian Principality". Principalities in lands of Galicia and Volhynia in international relations in the 11th-14th centuries. Colloquia Russica, I/2. Krakow: Uniwersytet Jagielloński. pp. 228–235.
- Font, Márta (2021). The Kings of the House of Árpád and the Rurikid Princes: Cooperation and conflict in medieval Hungary and Kievan Rus' (PDF). Budapest: Research Centre for the Humanities. Archived from the original on 2025-12-25.
- Font, Márta (2023). "The Title rex Galiciae between Ambitions and Reality (c. 1100-r. 1400)". Unions and Divisions: New Forms of Rule in Medieval and Renaissance Europe. New York: Routledge. pp. 107–118.
- Litwin, Henryk (October 2016). "Central European Superpower". Business Ukraine. pp. 26–29. Archived from the original on 2020-08-09.PDF version at the Wayback Machine (archived 2016-11-12).
- Merten, Ulrich (2015). Voices from the Gulag: Oppression of the German Minority in the Soviet Union. Lincoln, NE: American Historical Society of Germans from Russia. ISBN 9780692603376
- Potocki, Jan (1805). Histoire anciènne du gouvernement de Volhynie: pour servir de suite à l'histoire primitive des peuples de la Russie (in French) at Polona. Saint Petersburg: Imperial Academy of Sciences.
