= Volhynians =

Medieval East Slavic tribe

The Volhynians (Ukrainian: Волиняни, Volyniany, Polish: Wołynianie) were an East Slavic tribe of the Early Middle Ages and the Principality of Volhynia in 987–1199.

== Historiography ==
=== Russian perspective ===
Russian historiography on regions like Volhynia, specifically before the emergence of the Soviet Union in 1922, brought together Eastern European lands as justification for Romanov rule. From this two branches of historiography can be traced into the 20th century. The split stems from different arguments surrounding the stability of the Kievan Rus' prior to the Mongol Invasion in the 13th Century. Solov'ev and Kliuchevskii declared the state of the Kievan Rus' to be dissolving at the time of the invasion, while others, typically Soviet historians, like Grekov argued that the main principalities of the Kievan Rus', like Galica-Volhynia at this time, were stable en route to being invaded by the Mongols.

=== Ukrainian perspective ===
The Ukrainian study of their own respective medieval past begins with the study of the Cossack Chronicles. The Chronicles, authored in the 17th and 18th centuries, traces Ukrainian history from biblical eras into the time of the Khazars. in the 1920s Soviet censorship restricted the study and publication of literary work that demonstrated a separate national and historical background for Ukraine as something non-Muscovite, and therefore non-Russian.

The era of Romanticism in the 19th century brought with it the idea of human ingenuity as the most relevant driving historical force, and authors like Maksymovych and Kostomarov published works like Books of Genesis of the Ukrainian People to popularize this theory. These works were primarily pro-Ukrainian and othered influences like Poland and Lithuania in the general development of Eastern Europe. Volhynia has at different points in time existed in Ukrainian, Polish, Belarusian, and Lithuanian spaces and so must be qualified in this argument as solely Ukrainian in the perspective of Maksymovych and Kostomarov.

Mykhailo Hrushevs'ky in the early 20th century generated what is widely considered the most complete repudiation of the Soviet conception of Ukrainian history. His work History of Ukraine-Rus', 1898-1937 reached global audiences and presented a concrete path for Ukrainian history that did not link them directly to the Muscovite succession.

== Origins and heritage ==
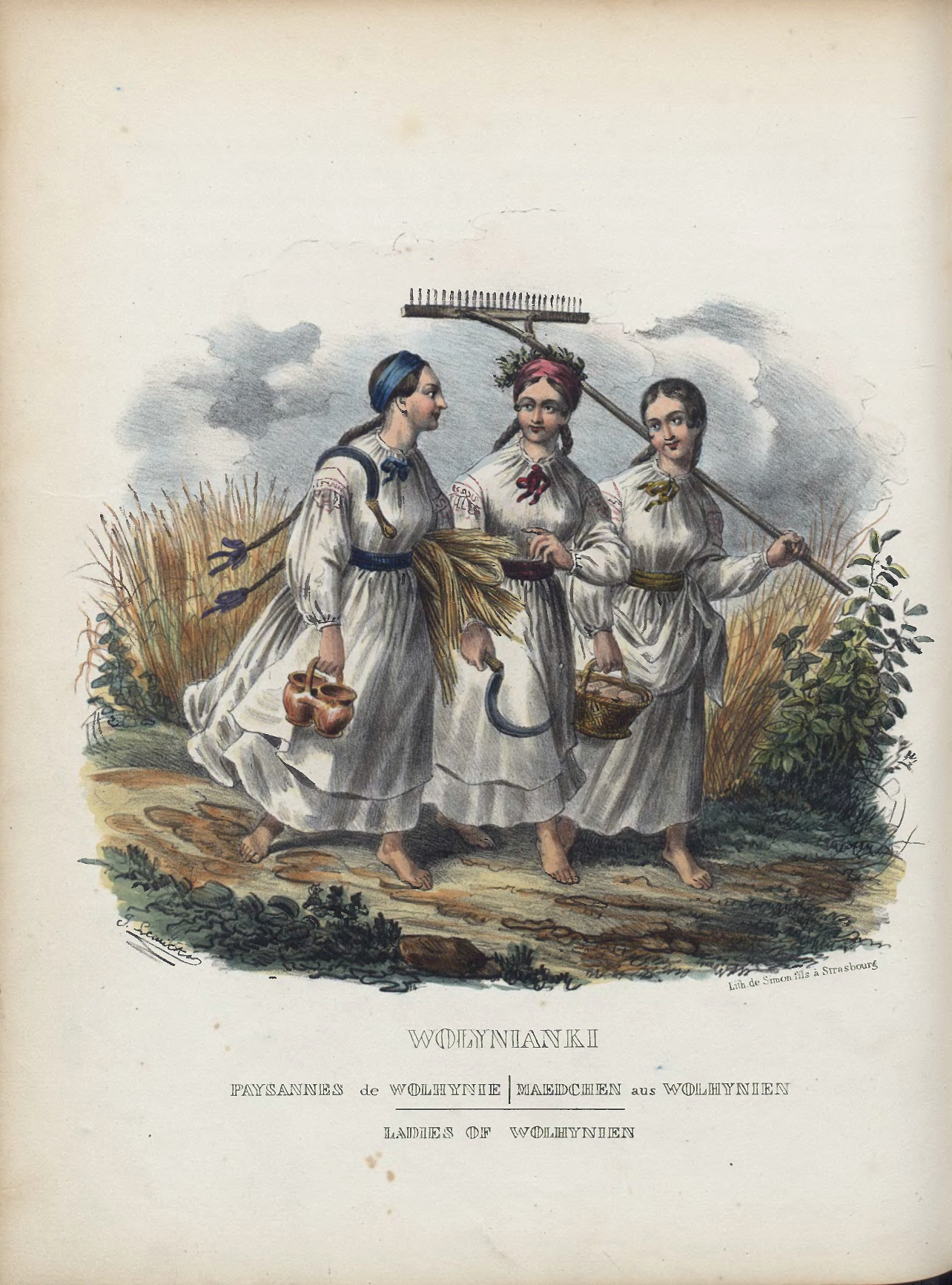
Volynians (Polish: Wołynianki)

Among many East Slavic Tribes, the Volhynians are mentioned in the Primary Chronicle and lived along the Bug river in the region of Volhynia, that covered present-day sections of eastern Poland, western Ukraine and southern Belarus. The Encyclopedia of Ukraine lists the Volhynians among the proto-Ukrainian tribes that inhabited Ukrainian territory from the 7th century onward. According to the information from the chronicle, it is considered that the Volhynians are descendants of the Dulebes and Buzhans.

According to the tradition recorded by Al-Masudi and Abraham ben Jacob, in ancient times the Walitābā and their king Mājik, which some read as Walīnānā and identified with the Volhynians, were "the original, pure-blooded Saqaliba, the most highly honoured" and dominated the rest of the Slavic tribes, but due to "dissent" their "original organization was destroyed" and "the people divided into factions, each of them ruled by their own king", implying existence of a Slavic federation which perished after the attack of the Avars.

== Christianization ==
In the 10th century the Volhynians came under the rule of Kievan Rus'. In 981 and 993 Vladimir the Great secured the lands along the San and beyond the Bug. Vladimir adopted Christianity, believing it would strengthen the state, and ordered all his people to be baptized in 988–989. A Volhynian eparchy was established in the 990s. Both previously and well after the Christianization of the East Slavs, the Volhynians practiced pagan and animalistic rituals despite Vladimir's decree.

In order to maintain Christianity, Vladimir the Great placed his son Vsevolod as prince over Vladimir, Volhynia's most prominent city.

== Power and succession ==
For much of the 9th and 10th centuries when Kievan rule was established Volhynia acted in line but semi-independently from the prince-hood.

In the late 11th Century Kievan rule fell into decline after the death of Yaroslav the Wise and Volhynia, as one portion of a fragmented Kievan Rus', shifted into an aristocratic rule in which the territory was controlled by Boyars. These Boyars, due in majority part to their geographic position relative to the capital of the Kievan Rus' were controlled by the Grand Prince of Kiev in a way that allowed Volhynia to adopt the systems and customs, such as Christianity, in a concrete way. In 1146, Volhynia reverted to a patriarchal succession state when Iziaslav Mstislavich decided his son would take the throne, rather than continue allowing the Kievan prince or an associate of the prince to control the principality.

The end of the 10th century brought with it the merger of Galicia and Volhynia. After the conclusion of several conflicts and the ending of the Rostyslavych princely line, Galicia was incorporated into Volhynia by Roman the Great in 1199.

== Trade and connections ==
Trade routes used by the Varangians to access Constantinople served as the foundation for a foreign trade economy

Much of Volhynia's influence as a powerful principality of the Kievan Rus' developed from geographical proximity. The kingdoms of Hungary, Poland, and Lithuania all increased the relevance of Volhynia as a center of trade for the Kievan Rus'. The commercial gains of this southwest region promoted moving from Eastern Europe into the Black Sea

Even domestically, the movement of ideas promoted glasswork and artisanship among the most populated regions in the Kievan Rus', including Vladimir.

== See also ==
- Volhynia
- Volhynian Germans (Volhynia Germans; de: Wolhyniendeutsche, Wolyniendeutsche, Woliniendeitsche)
- List of Medieval Slavic tribes
- Galicia-Volhynia
