= Ukrainian national clothing =

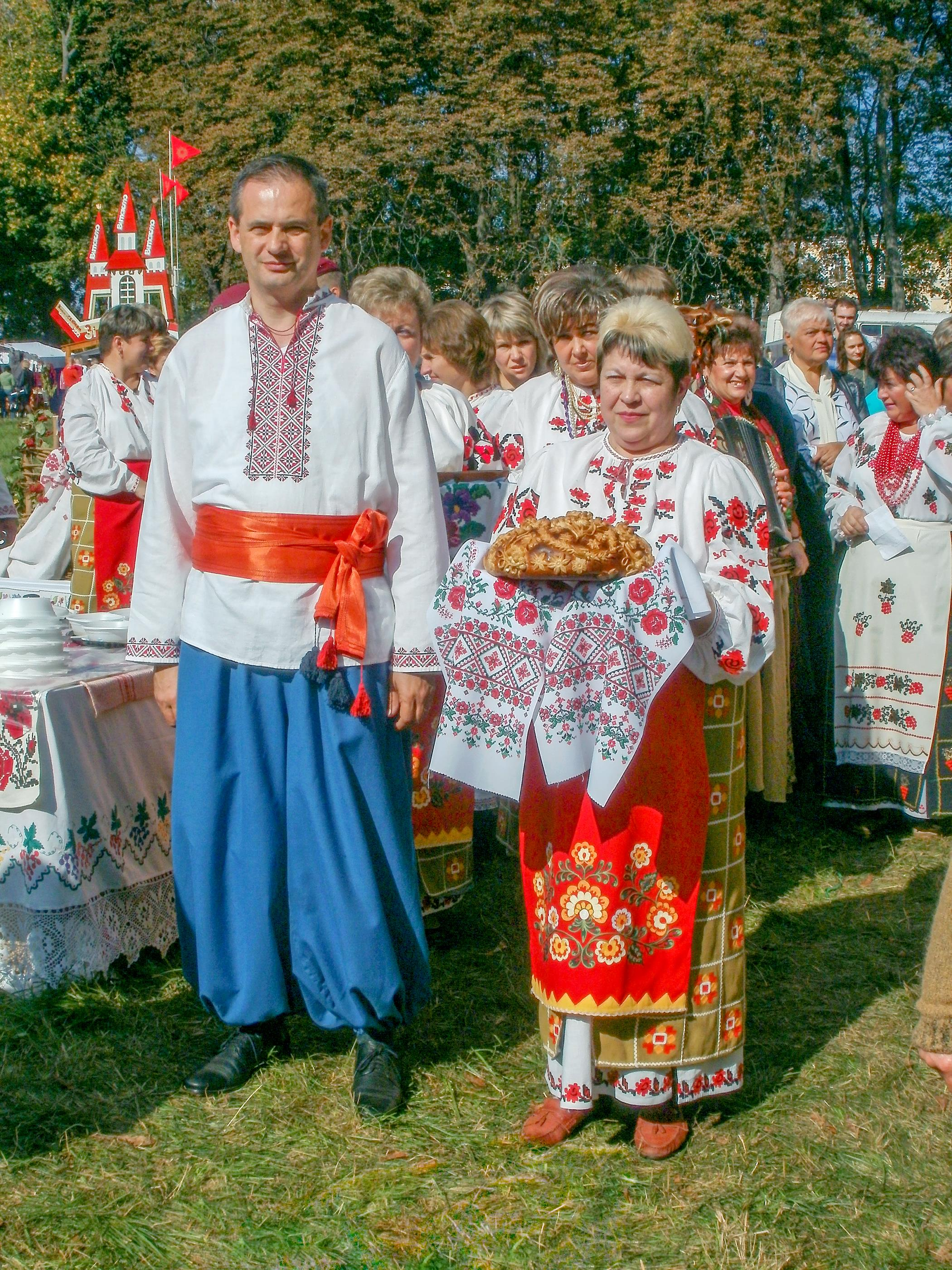
Ukrainian man and woman wearing traditional clothing

Ukrainian national clothing is the clothing worn by people living in Ukraine, mainly ethnic Ukrainians. The most famous Ukrainian clothing items are the embroidered shirt (vyshyvanka), a cloth sash and a vinok flower crown. The clothing styles differed between the four macroregions of Ukraine: Polissia, Lisostep, Step and Carpathians. Traditional clothing differentiated people by gender and social status, by place of residence and wealth.

== History ==
Ukrainian national costume and garment-making techniques took shape during the Cossack era, roughly the 16th and 17th centuries—and were preserved and actively developed during the second half of the 19th century within the Russian and Austro-Hungarian Empires. Its diversity was particularly rich in the Kherson and Yekaterinoslav governorates. A major upsurge in Ukrainian culture was observed during the Revolution of 1917; Ukrainian national ornamental motifs even appeared on military uniforms, worn by both rank-and-file soldiers and officers of the Ukrainian People's Army. This momentum was sustained during the early years of Soviet rule, the New Economic Policy and the policy of Ukrainisation, prior to the onset of the Stalinist repressions.

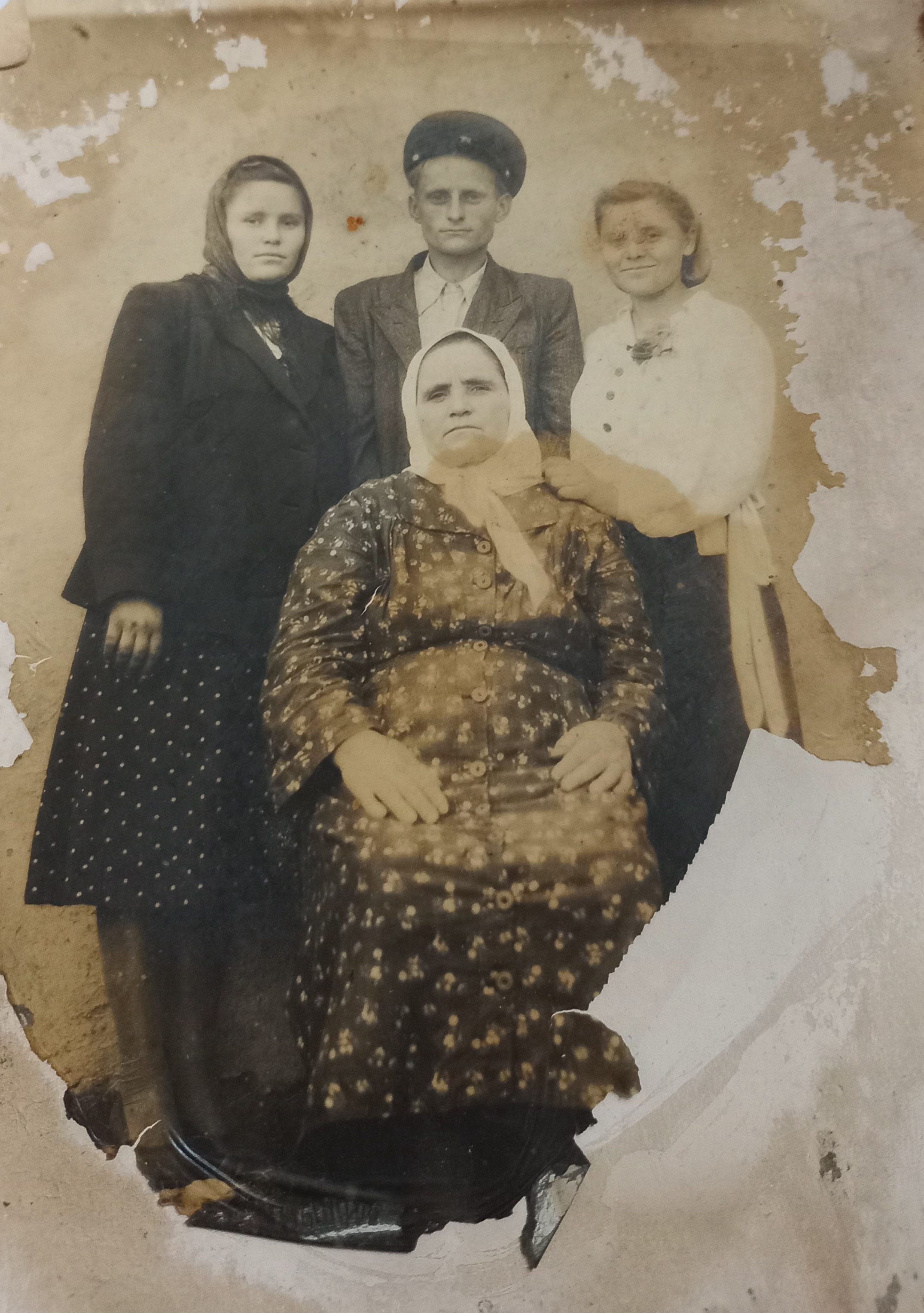
Residents of the village of Novooleksandrivka, Kirovohrad Oblast, Ukrainian SSR; early 1950s. As a result of the dekulakisation campaign, which continued even after World War II, almost all traditional folk costumes in the region were destroyed and replaced by clothing conforming to standard all-Soviet styles

Under the Stalins rule particularly amidst collectivisation, the dekulakisation campaign, and the forced replacement of the Ukrainian language with Russian the lives of Ukrainians in the Ukrainian SSR were utterly transformed. Traditional costumes, necklaces, and jewelry virtually vanished from everyday life; their owners were branded "nationalists" and "kulaks", and their possessions were confiscated or destroyed by the OGPU and NKVD between the 1930s and the 1950s. This process obliterated centuries-old traditions of garment creation and intergenerational transmission; from the 1930s onward, such attire was relegated to the status of stage props for official performance ensembles, while regional diversity and symbolism were effectively erased. Ukrainians who survived the famine of 1932–1933, escaped execution under the Law of Spikelets, and avoided deportation to the Gulag yet found themselves held captive by the Kolkhoz system were compelled to wear the same standardized work and casual clothing found throughout the rest of the USSR. A similar fate befell the traditional folk costumes of Western Ukraine, though on a much smaller scale. During the Khrushchev Thaw, there was a certain flourishing and popularisation of Ukrainian culture, which was also reflected in Sergei Parajanov's famous film, Shadows of Forgotten Ancestors, but traditional Ukrainian costume was never revived en masse due to the severe demographic losses of the Ukrainian population as a result of Bolshevik policies and World War II.

During decommunisation in modern Ukraine, there has been a gradual popularisation of Ukrainian folk life, including clothing.

== Shirts ==
The embroidered sorochka shirt (Ukrainian: сорочка), also known as vyshyvanka, is the most important element of the Ukrainian costume. Vyshyvankas were typically made from hemp of linen and differed significantly between regions, in both cut and decor.

The earliest vyshyvankas appeared in Ukrainian villages in the middle of the 18th century despite the fact that Ukrainian embroidery is known from 10 to 11 centuries, but it is limited to goldwork for the feudal nobility. After villagers started making vyshyvankas, they acquired a new symbolic meaning as magic talismans and even started being seen as wearer's substitution: for example, selling one's own vyshyvanka would result in selling one's happiness. Wedding shirts were especially prominent: they had a lot of symbolic adornments and had to be made from a single piece of fabric; one of the wedding traditions was the exchange of the groom's wedding shirt made by the bride for the bride's footwear, another one included newlyweds wiping their hands with their spouse's shirt after the marriage's consummation. Wedding shirts were kept for the rest of the person's life as amulets and put into the woman's grave after her death.

The typical silhouette of a Ukrainian shirt included a long straight sleeve that ends with a wristband cuff; the typical adornment was located at the cuff, the sleeve above the elbow and the shoulder, which is a custom adopted from Byzantium along with Christianity. The cut, colours, sewing and decorating techniques, the shape of the collar, the sleeve's shape and manner of attachment to the body are varied between regions.

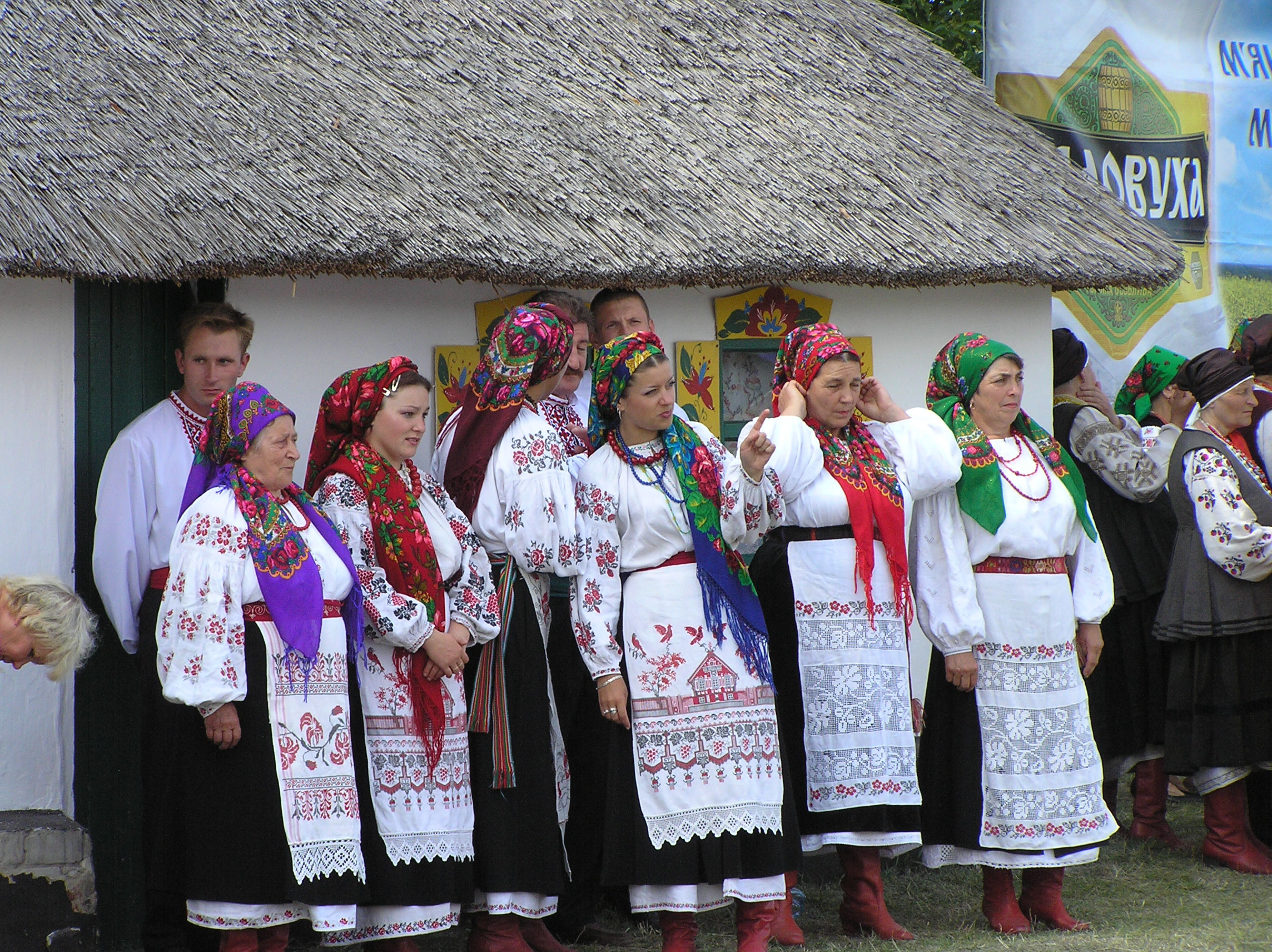
Sorochyntsi Fair

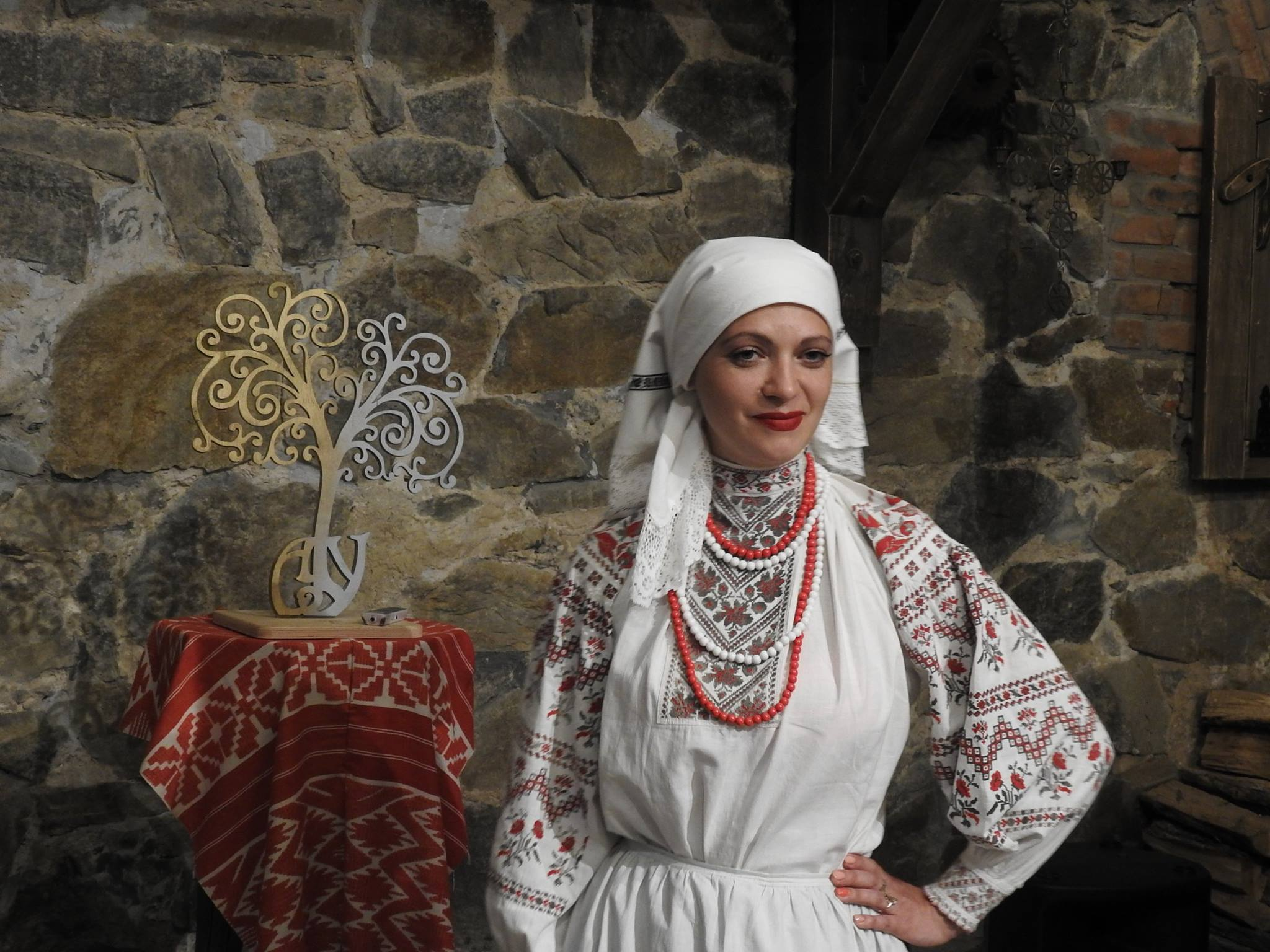
A reconstruction of the early 20th century costume

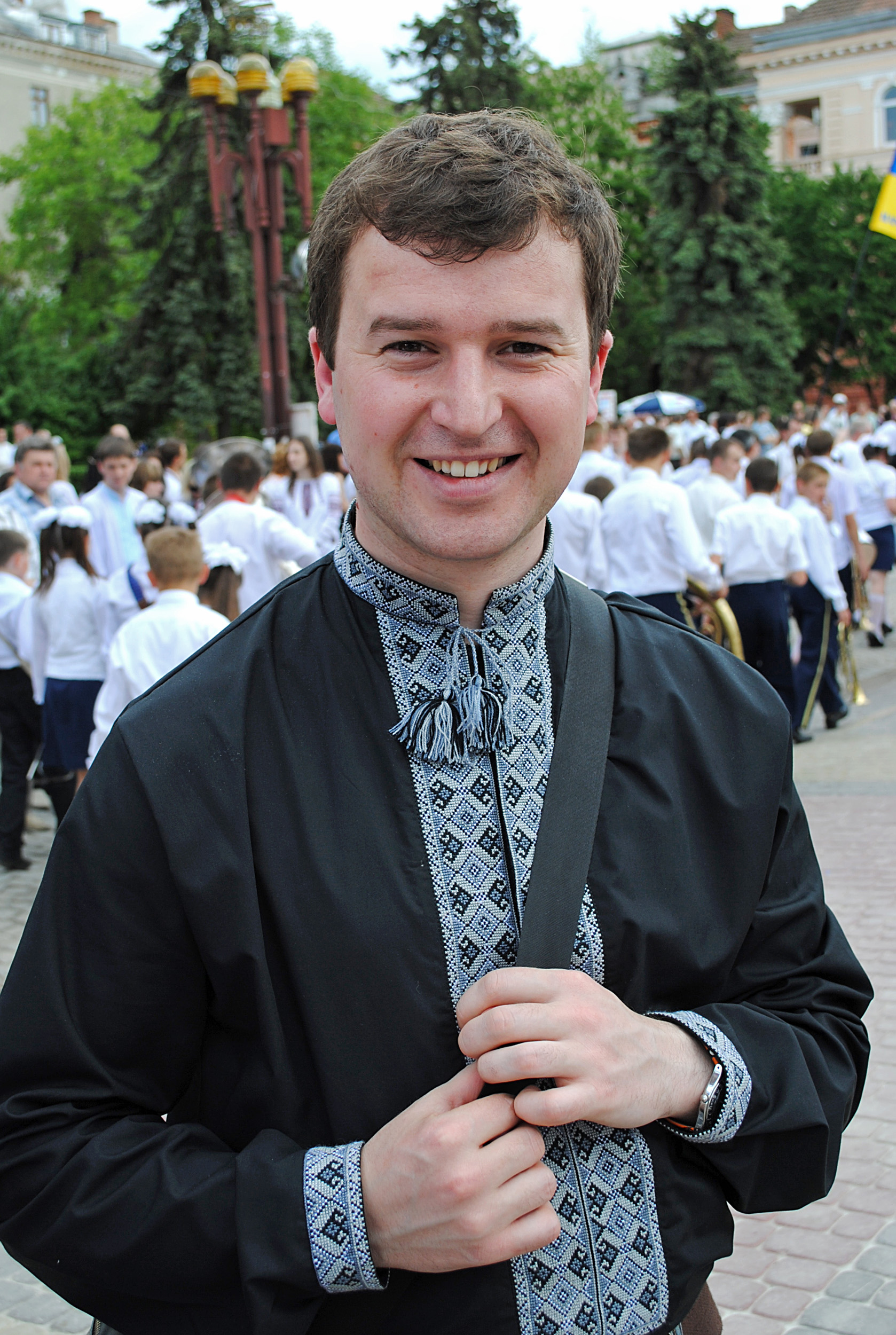
Ukrainian politician in a vyshyvanka

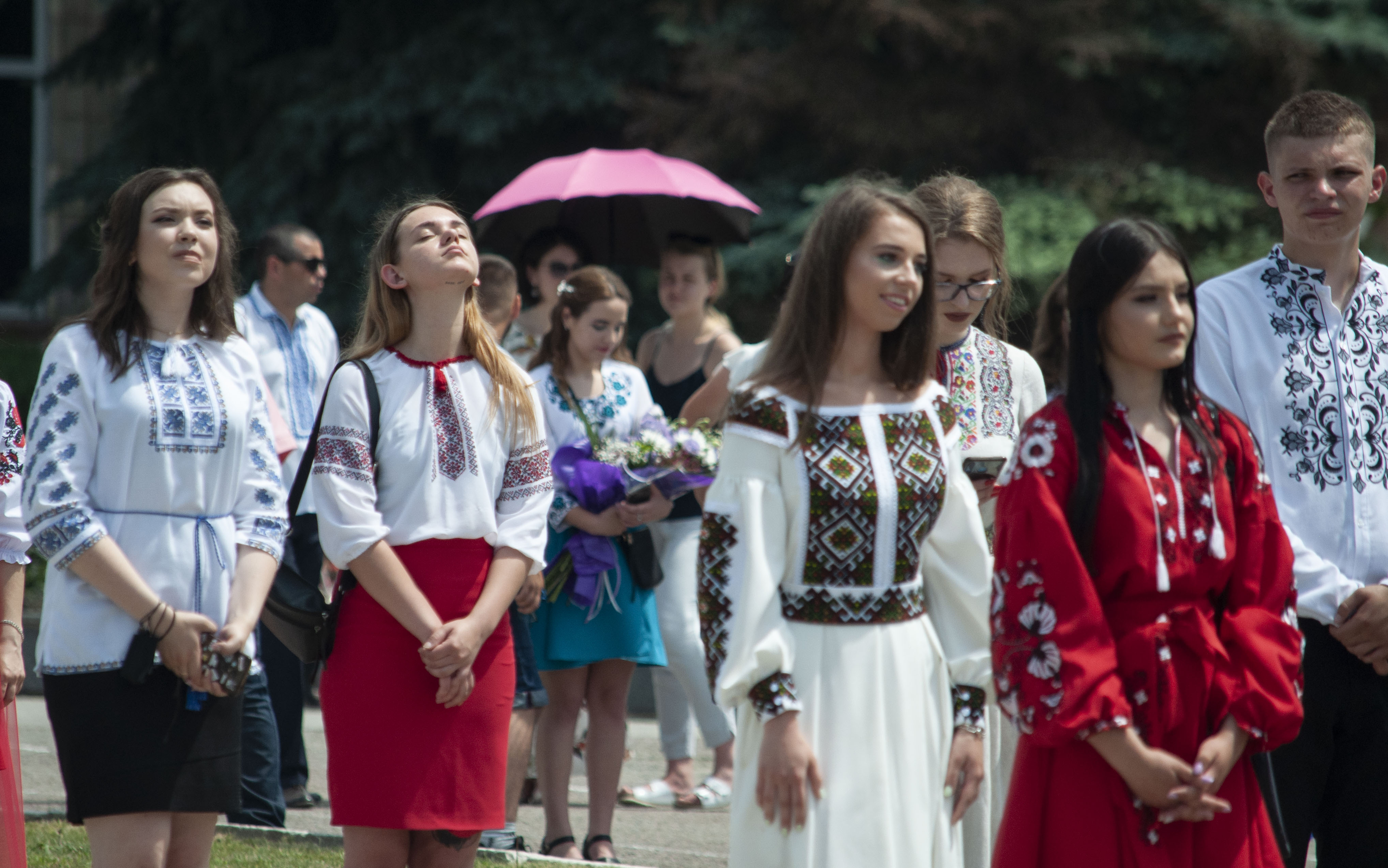
Graduation day in the Chortkiv Medical College

== Sashes and head coverings ==
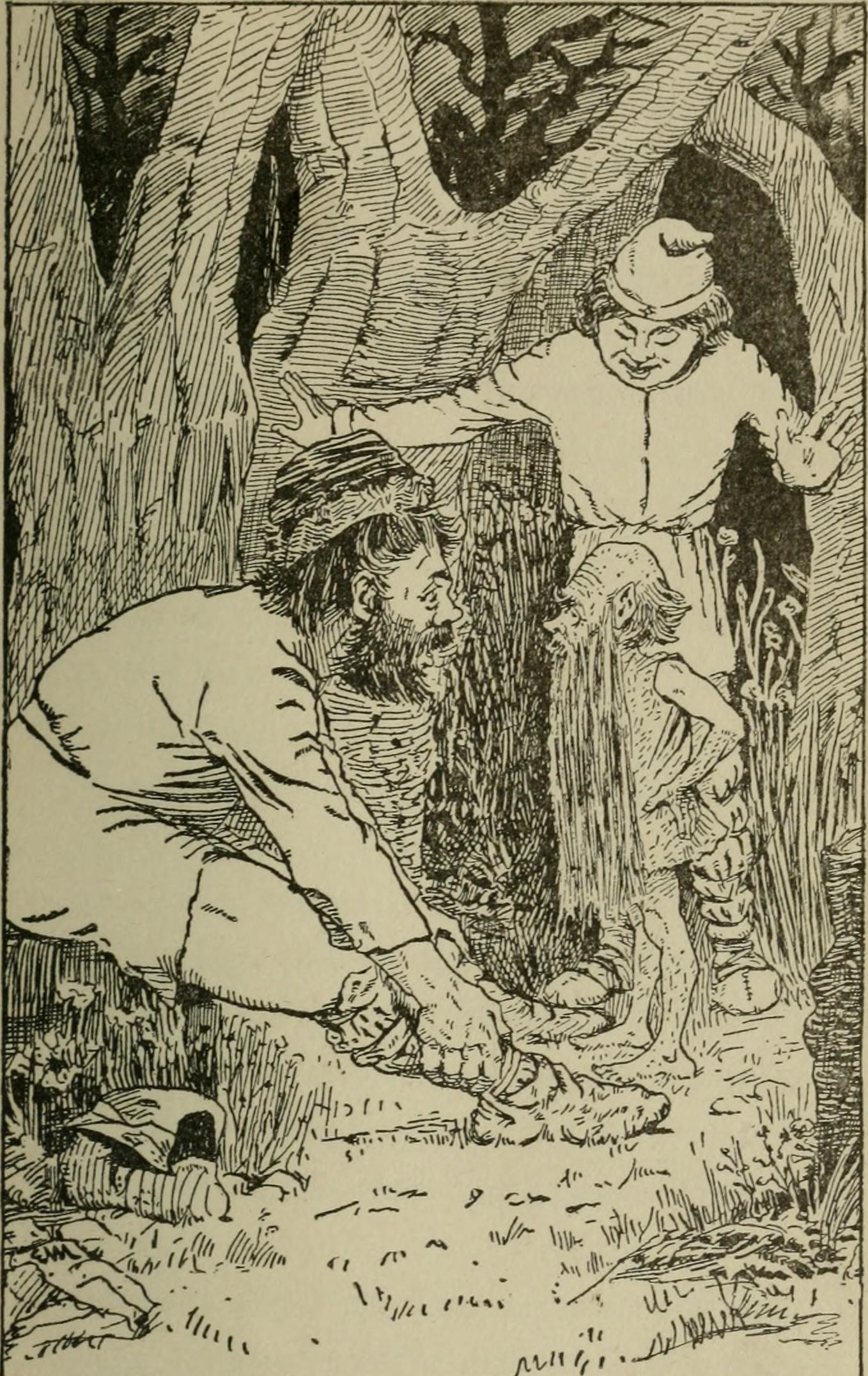
"Cossack fairy tales and folk-tales", the unsashed character Oh

Sashes were also used as symbols: of fertility, libido and child-bearing, as well as a representation of protection, unity and connectedness. Folklore characters who wore no belt were considered dangerous, such as witches and chthonic monsters like berehynias, mermaids and mavkas. People believed that stepping over a red wedding cloth sash would ease childbirth. Other than red cloth, a wedding sash could be made of an embroidered rushnyk cloth, especially with the Tree of life pattern.

Vinok, or the wreath, is the third national symbol of Ukraine. Flower crowns were worn by unmarried women and brides during the wedding, but the symbolic meaning of the wreath is wider: vinok is an ancient pagan talisman, it is used in the winter holiday season divination and other rituals. In winter time, wreaths were made from hay, wool, feathers and dried plants and leaves. Regional vinok variants include the feathered karabulya (Ukrainian: карабуля) from Carpathian Bukovina, silk ribbon wreaths of Kyiv and Poltava oblasts and others.

The married women's head covering, ochipok, was mainly an indicator of the wearer's marital status: she had to cover her hair after the wedding ceremony. The ochipok was in turn often covered by a piece of cloth (a namitka wimple or a khustka kerchief).

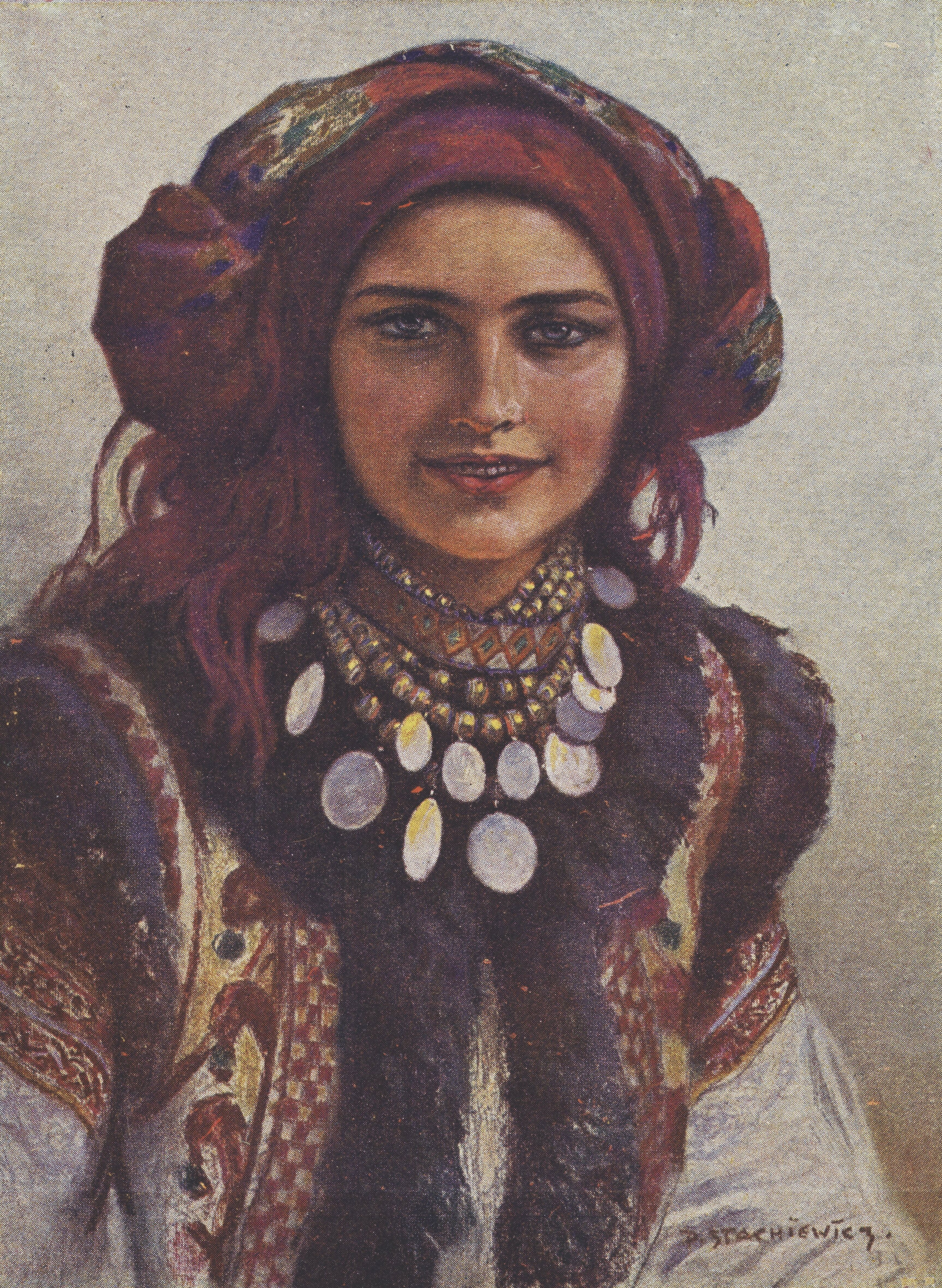
Hutzul. Piotr Stachiewicz

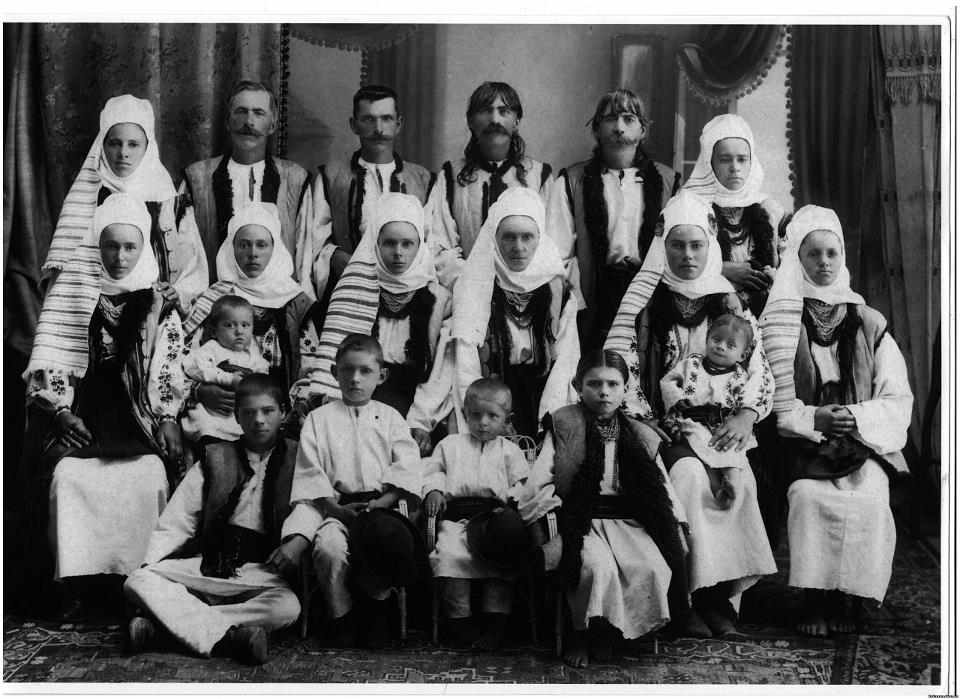
Namitky wimples and male haircuts from Bukovyna

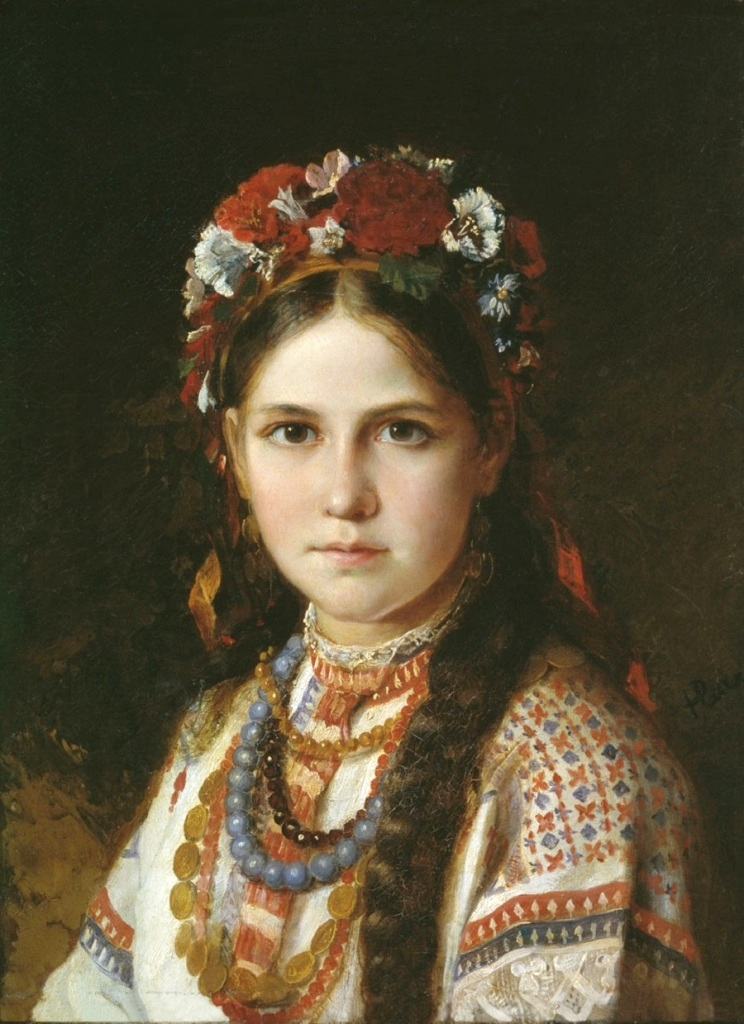
Ukrainian girl by Nikolay Rachkov wearing a wreath and a vyshyvanka

== Shoes ==
Polissya Ukrainians wore bast shoes (lychaky) while Carpathians had their postoly shoes made from leather; choboty boots with a seamed or seamless shaft were popular throughout Ukraine. The groom gifted choboty to the bride and her mother; this custom is centered at the Christmas Eve story by Nikolai Gogol. They were also featured in many winter divination rituals.

The cherevyky (Ukrainian: черевики) dress boots made from leather and colourful Saffian became popular among villagers in the 19 century. The colour of the materials would inform the name of the whole garment: green (zelenі) cherevyky were called zelenytsi (Ukrainian: зелениці) while the Poltava yellow-and-black ones were known as chornobryvtsi (marigolds).

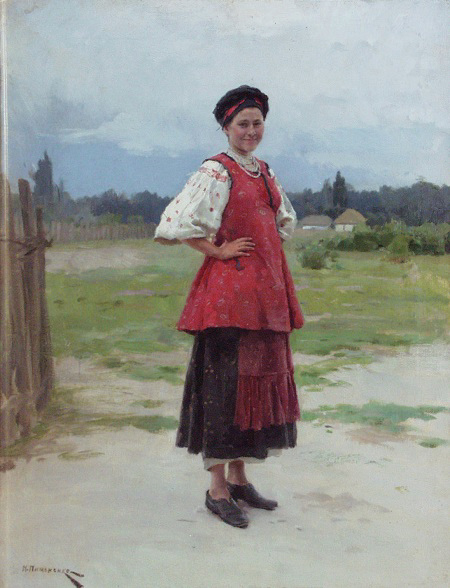
Young woman by Mykola Pymonenko wearing an ochipok and cherevyky

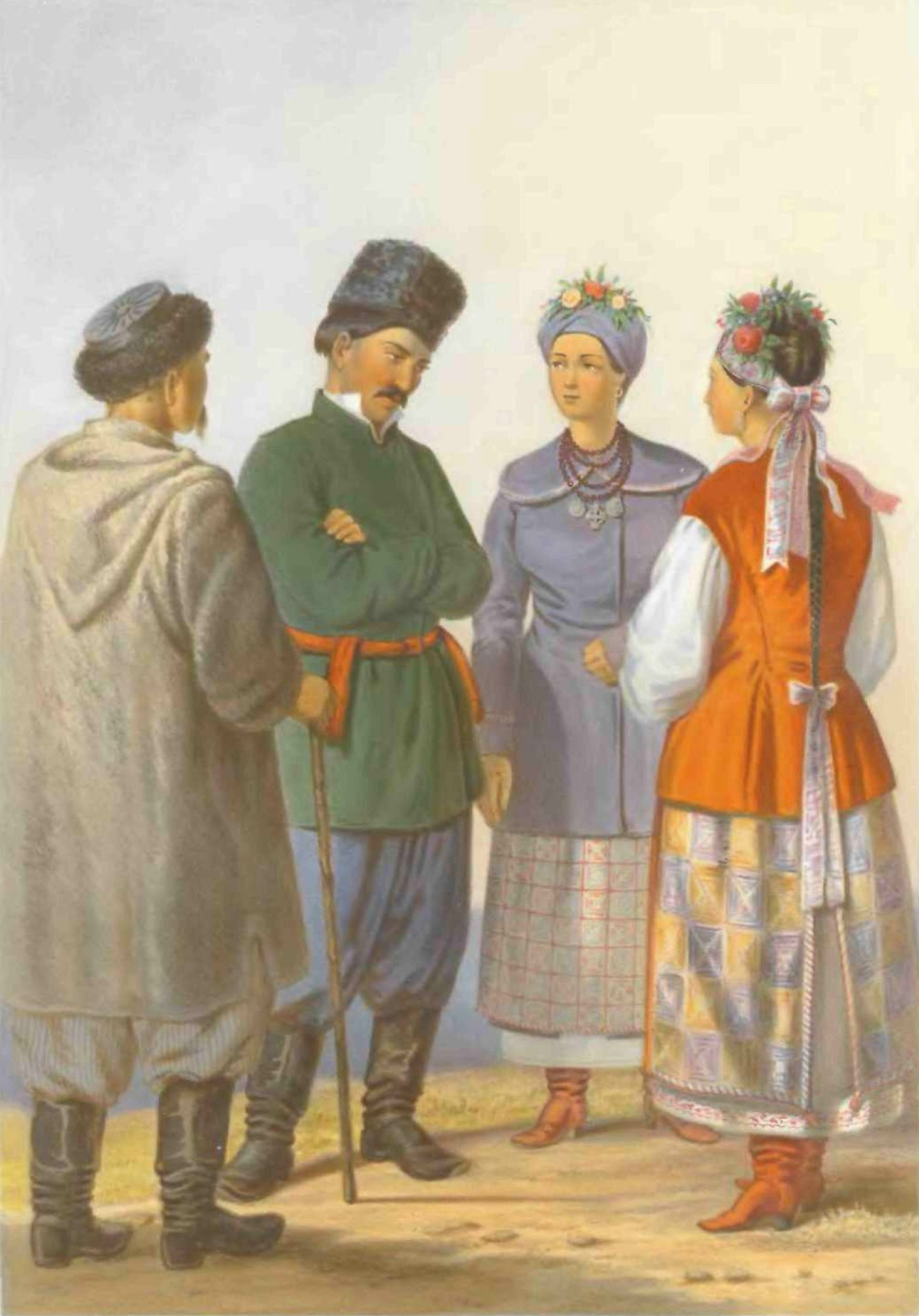
Ukrainians wearing different boots

== Outer garments ==
Kozhukh fur coats are prominent in Ukrainian culture as fertility-related symbols: the kozhukh turned inside out covered the bench from which the parents blessed their children's wedding; it also covered the seat of the bride during the unbraiding and the marital bed. A kozhukh worn wrong side out was worn by the bride's mother before the marriage. Kozhukhs could be decorated with black and grey wool, appliqué, embroidery and sewn-up colourful stings.

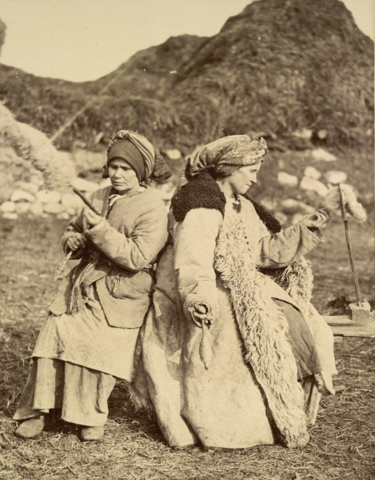
Women from Chernihiv region Ukraine wearing kozhukhs

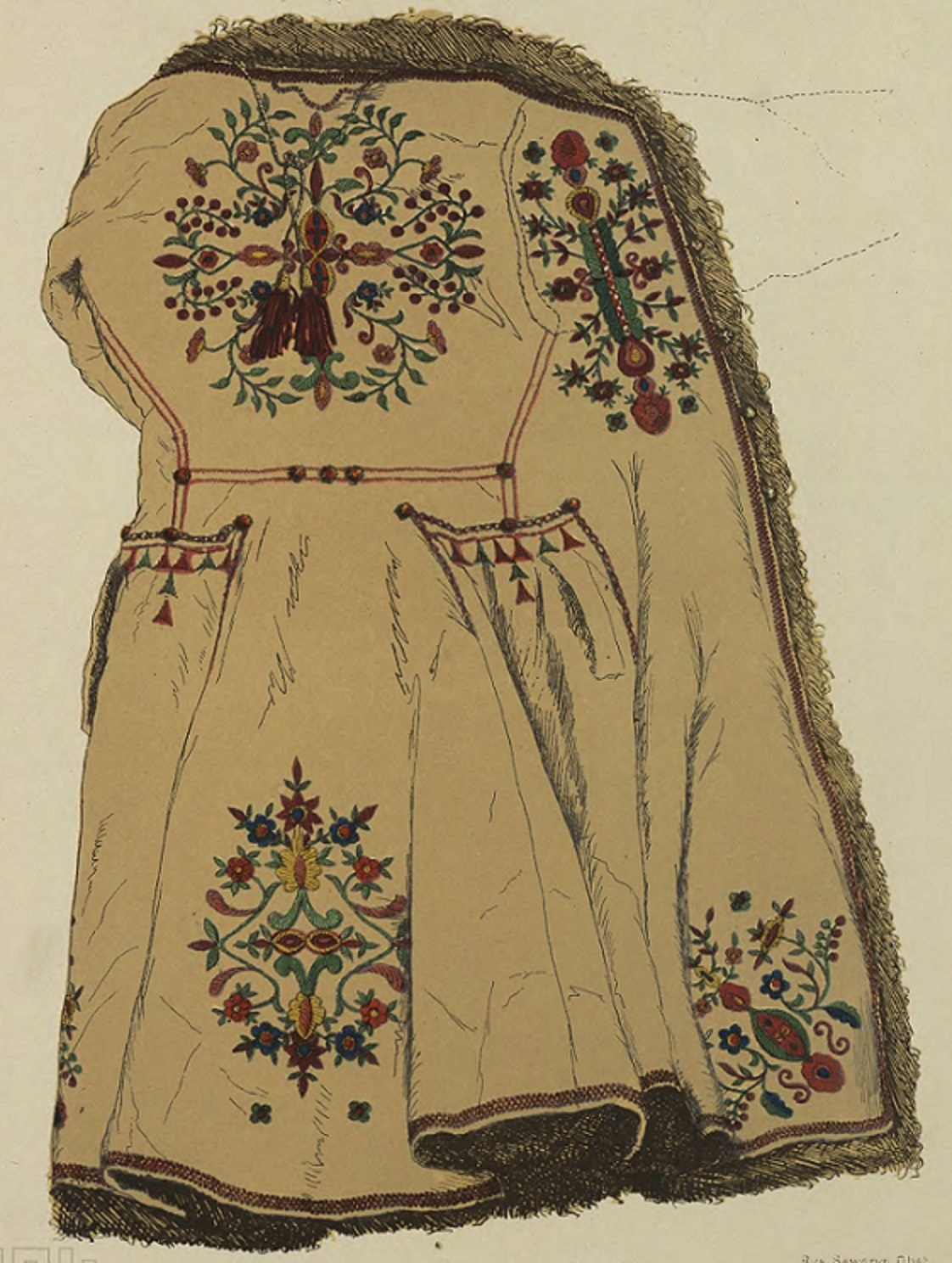
Embroidered kozhukh, 19 century

== Colour and motifs ==
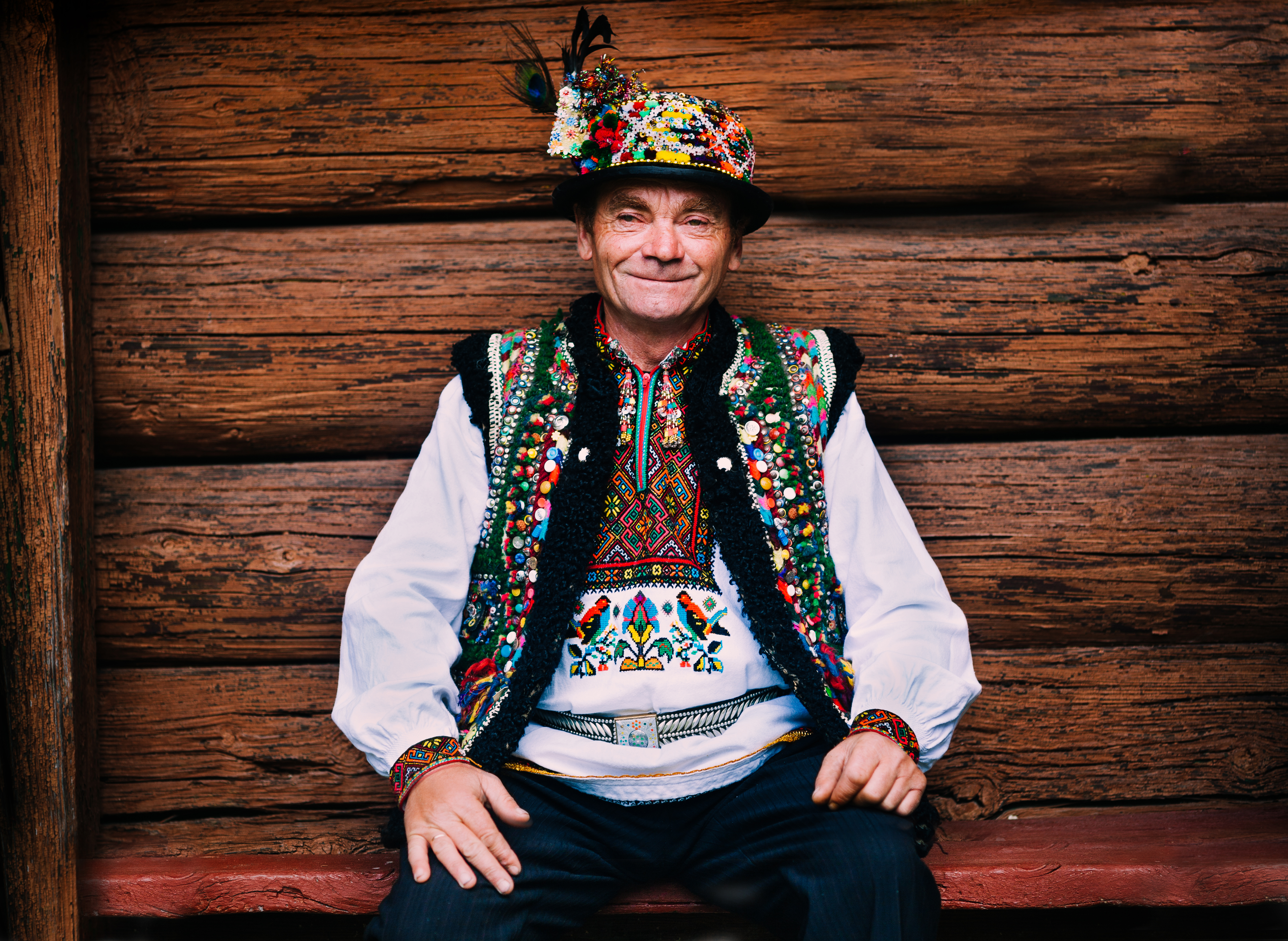
A Hutsul wearing a vyshyvanka under a vest

The most prominent colour of Ukrainian clothing is red. It can be found in every region, especially on festive clothing where it dominates. Polesian daily clothing is also decorated with red and white ornaments while Podoliyan costume was mainly using black and white; Hutsuls used a lot of orange and yellow while the clothing of Carpathian Ruthenia and Lemko Region employed blue even on festive wear.

Ukrainian embroidery decorated various items of clothing; historically, the most popular techniques were types of counted-thread embroidery such as pattern darning (both linework nyz and brickwork zanyzuvannya) and satin stitch, but later they lost their popularity due to the rise of cross-stitch embroidery. The typical motifs for clothing are geometric (lines, squares and diamonds; it is the most ancient type) and floral (mostly employed in the Western parts of Ukraine). Starting from the 1880s, Ukrainians added popular motifs printed in fashion magazines to their embroidery repertoire.

== Regional clothing ==
=== Polissia ===
The Polesia region includes Volhynian Polissya, Zhytomyr Polissya, Kyiv Polissia, Chernihiv Polissya and Novhorod-Siversky Polissya. The clothing of this region has Polish, Belarusian and Russian influences.

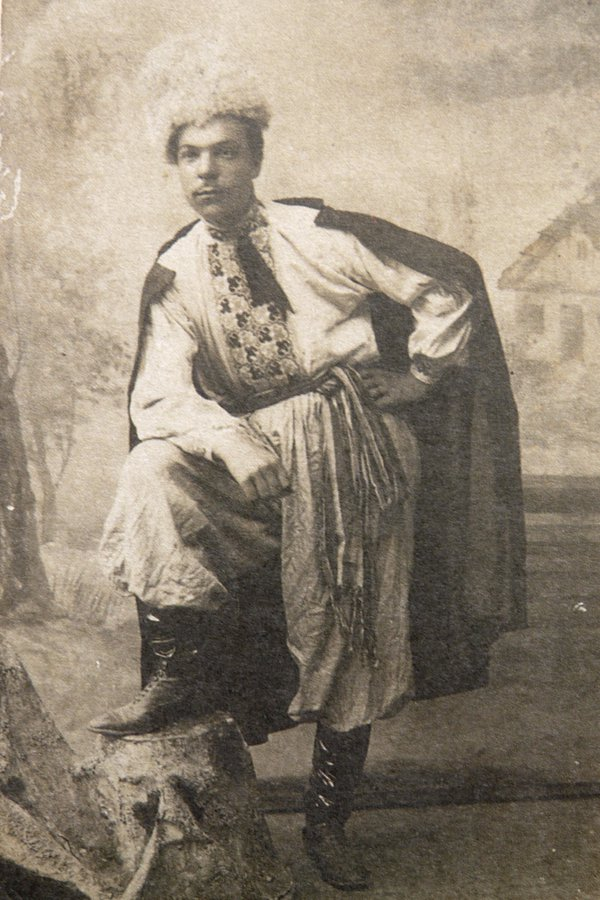
A man in a traditional dress from the outskirts of Mena in Chernihiv region, 1917

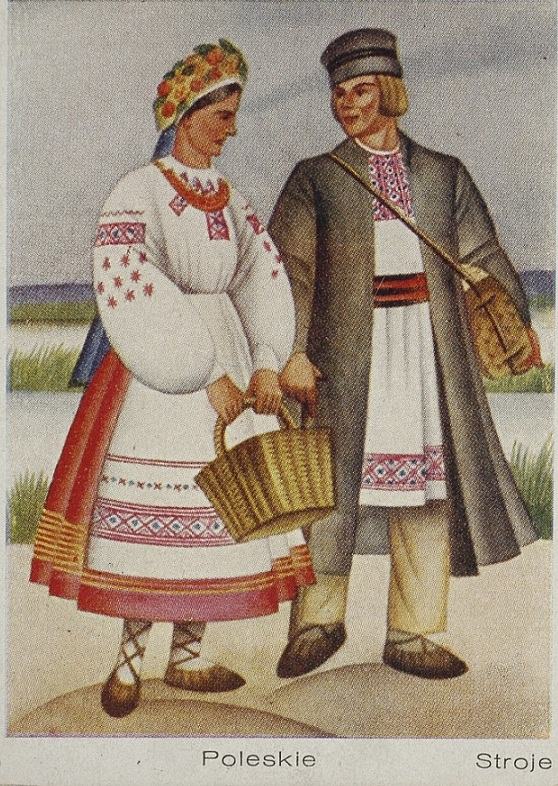
Traditional folk costume of Polissia, including bast shoes (lychaky)

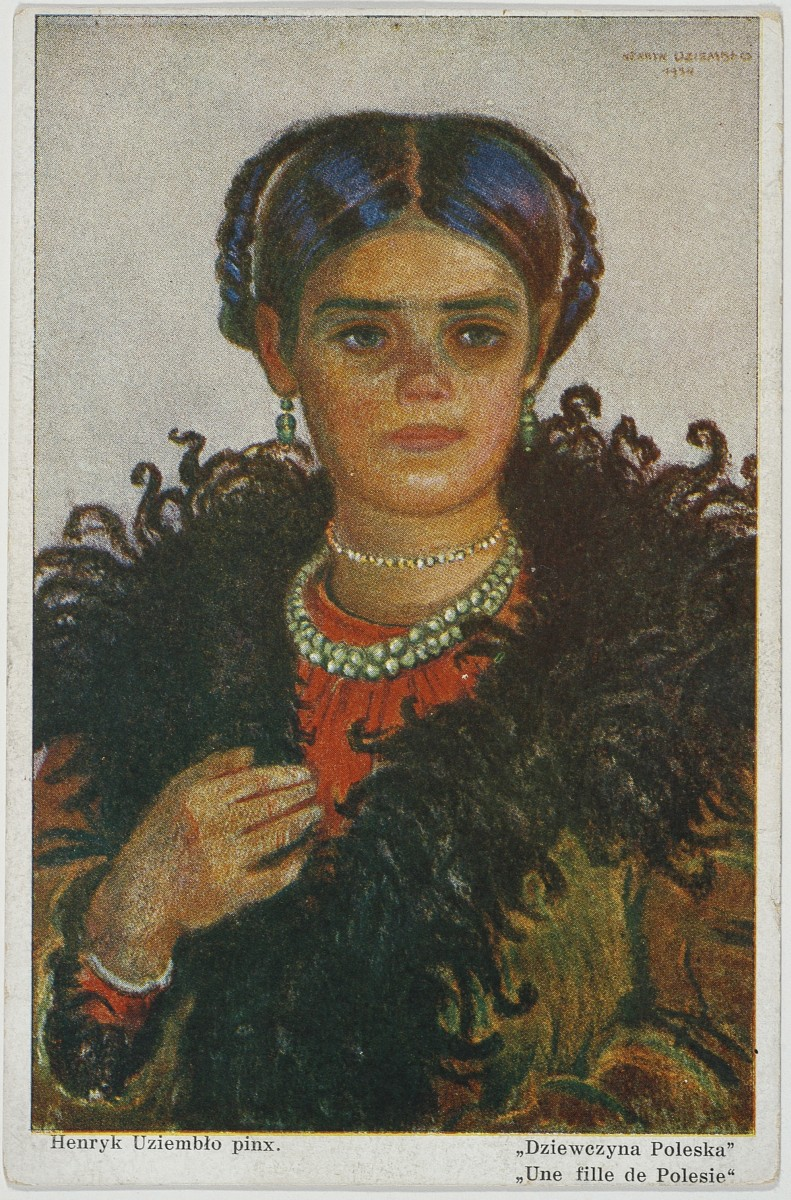
Portrait of a Polissian girl, 1934

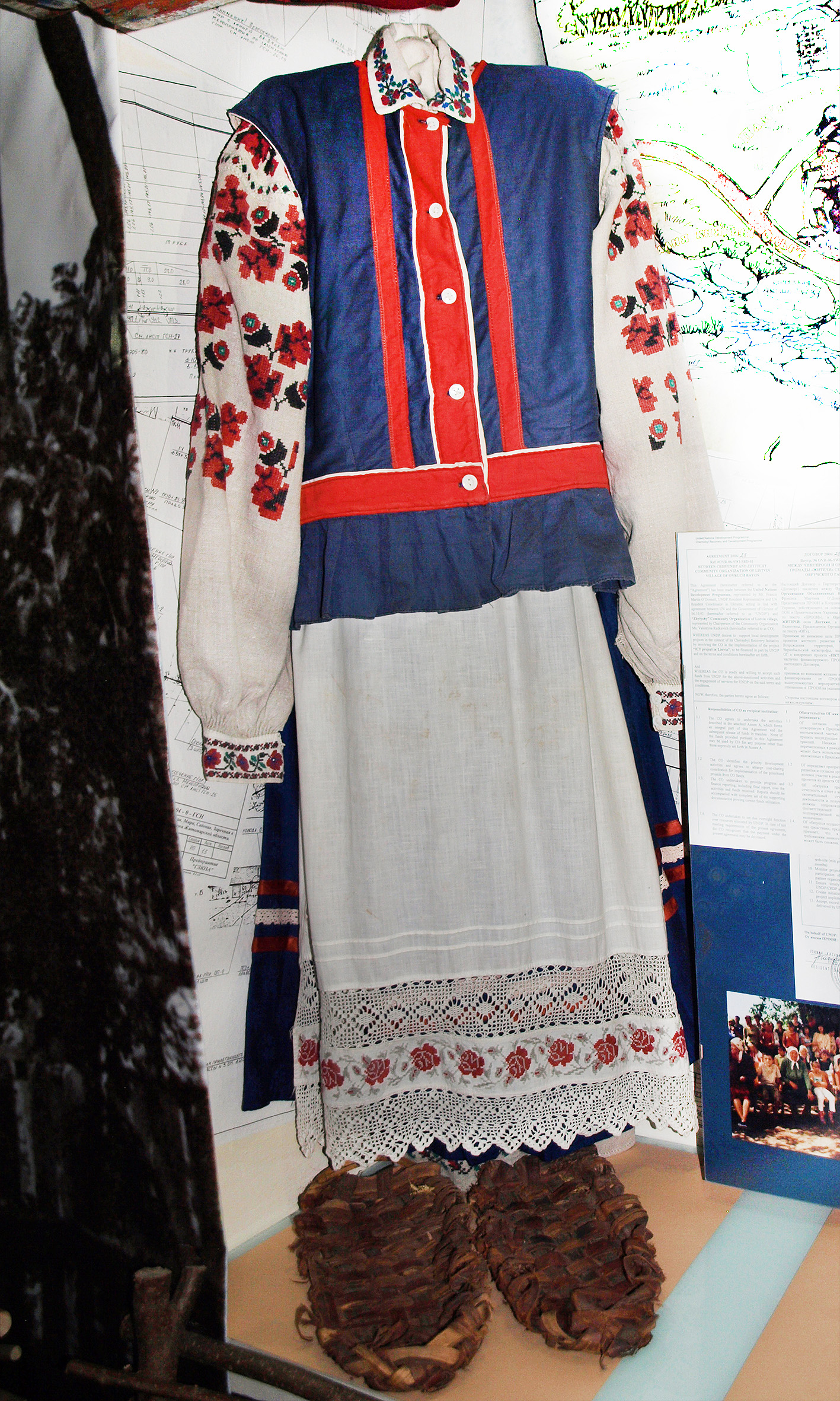
Traditional female dress of the Chornobyl area

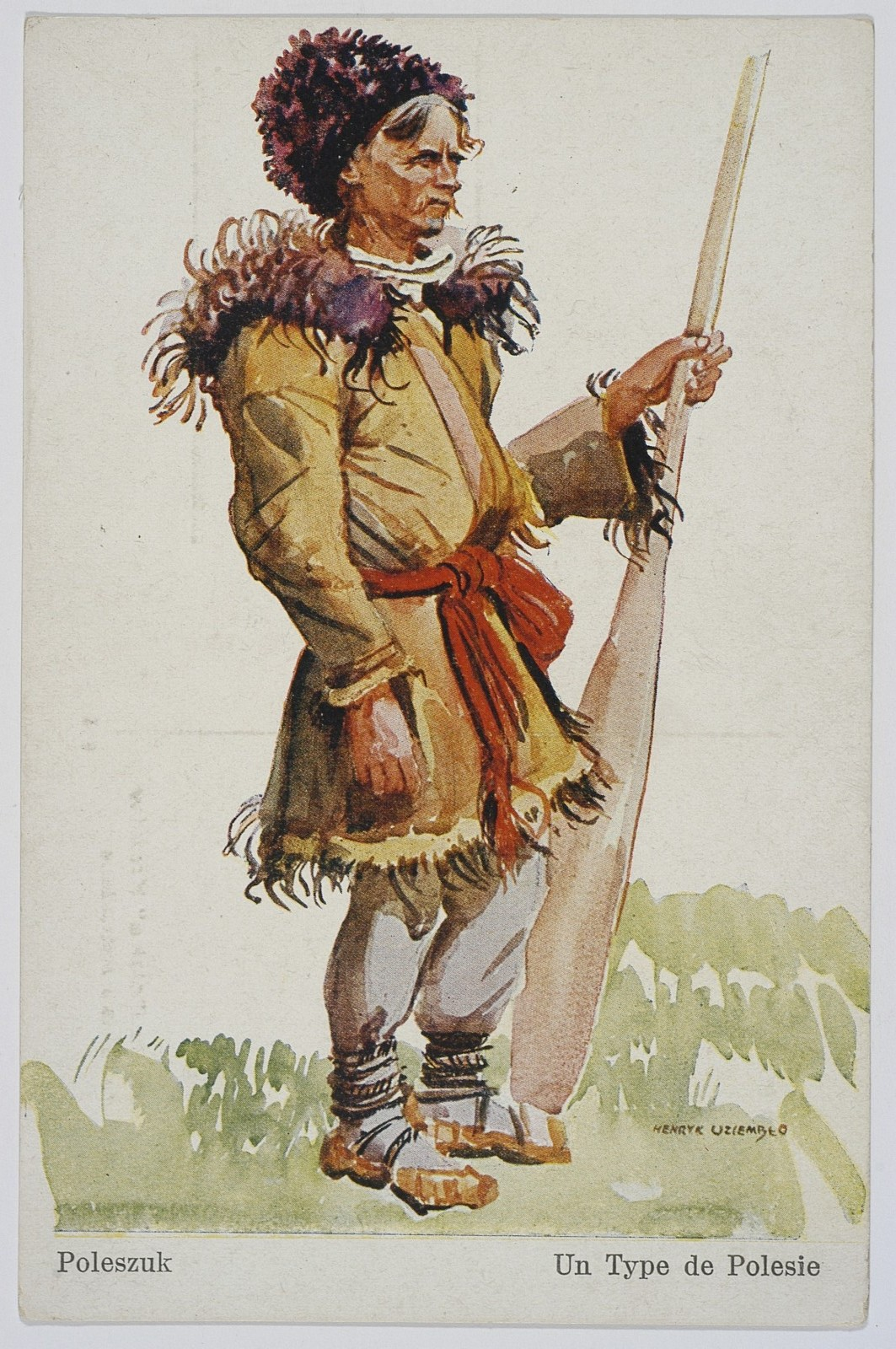
A Polishchuk man, 1930s

=== Lisostep ===
The Lisostep region includes Volyn, Galicia, Opillia, Podillia, the Middle Dnieper region, Poltavshchyna and Slobozhanshchyna. The typical Lisostep clothing ensemble includes a variety of sleeveless garments worn with wide or fitted skirts for women and trousers for men. The clothes are colourful and have both geometric and floral ornaments.

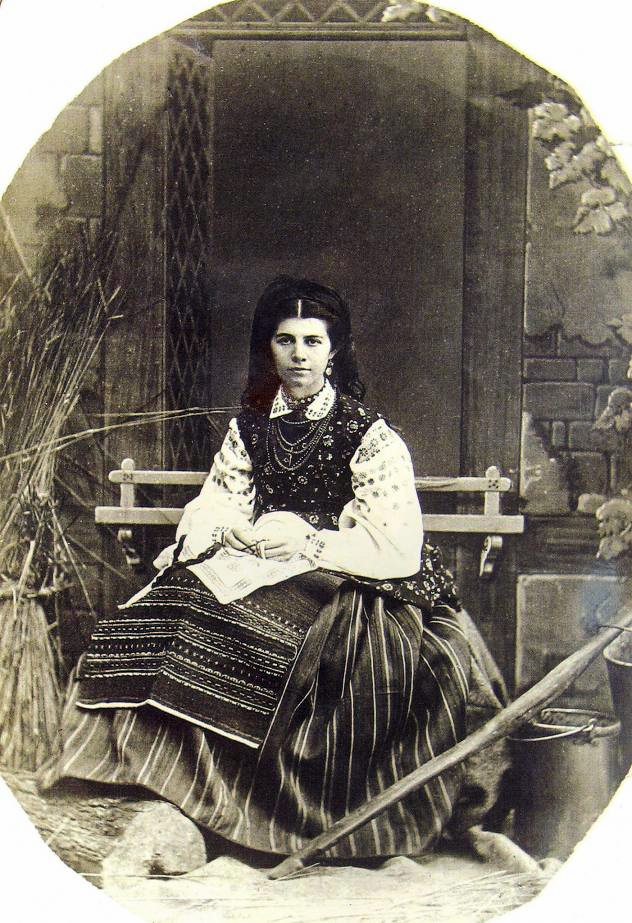
Olena Pchilka weraing the traditional folk dress of Volhynia

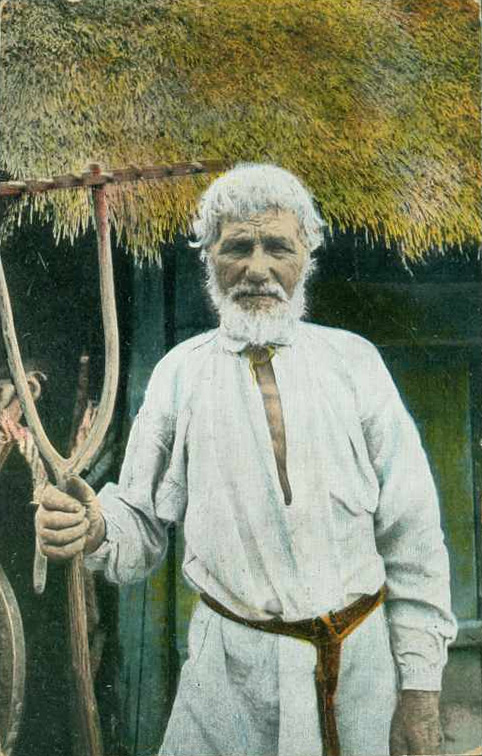
A Volhynian man from Mizoch, 1917

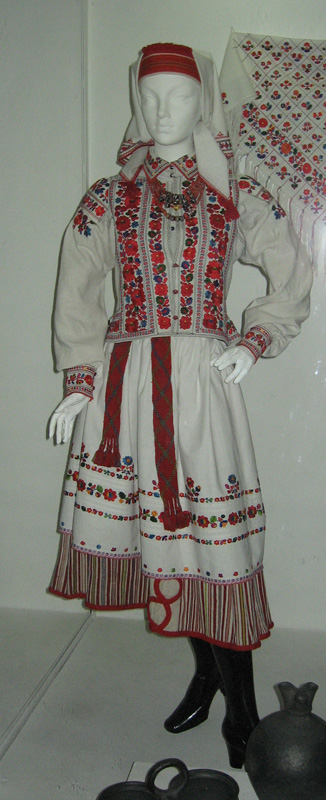
Female dress from the Yavoriv area, Galicia

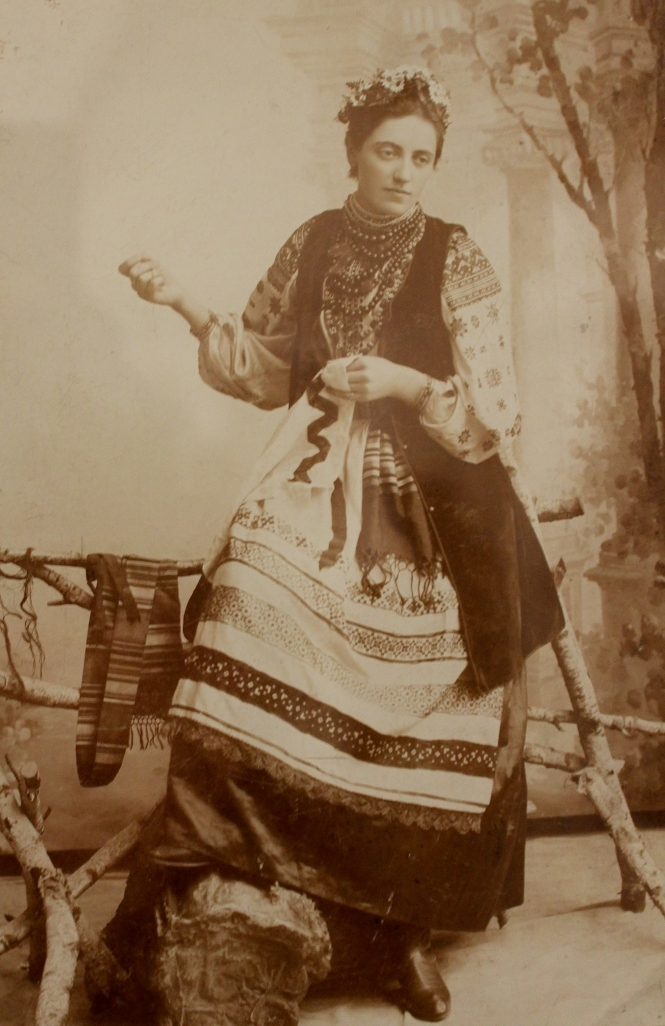
Solomiya Krushelnytska in a Podillian costume, 1892

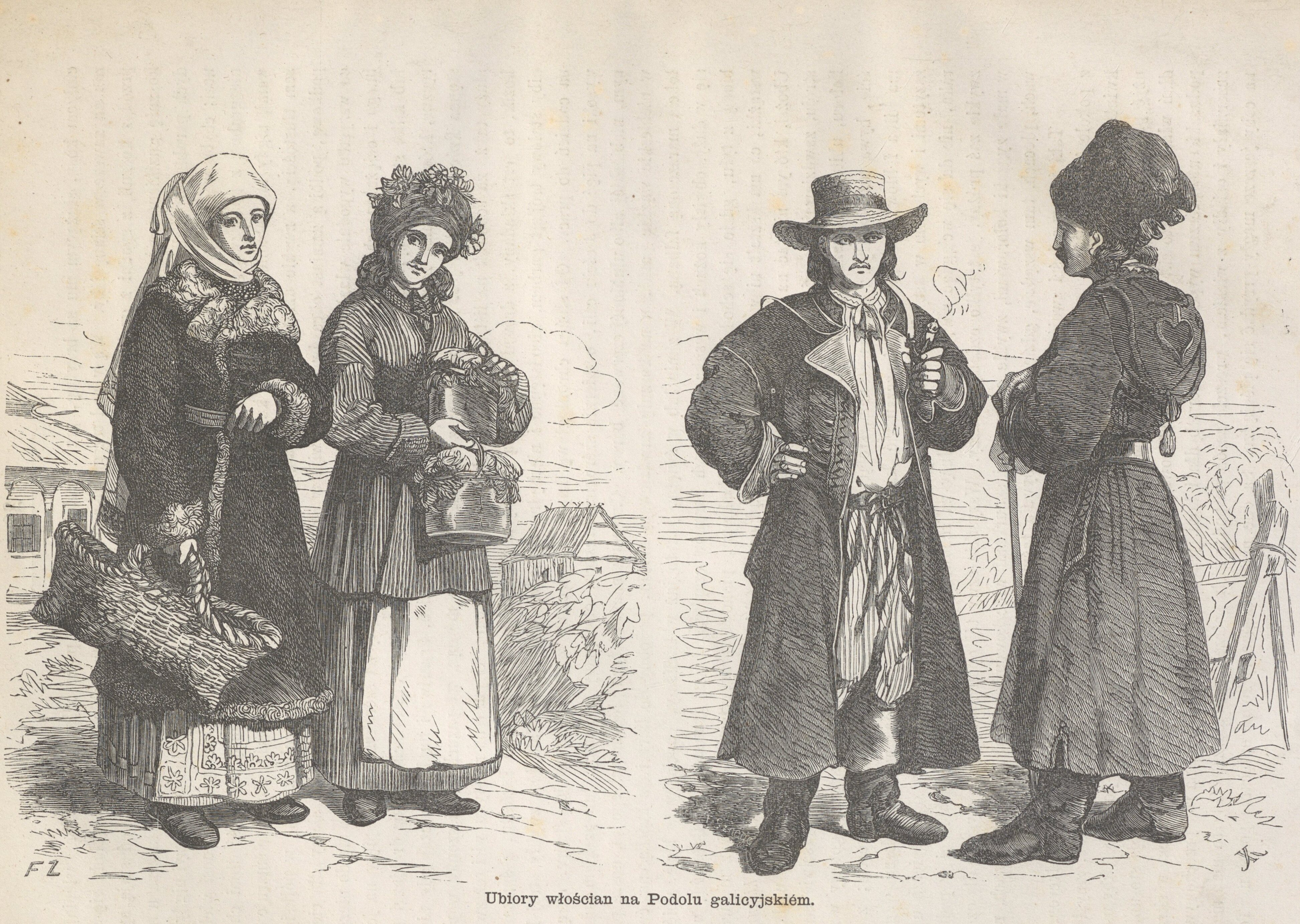
Traditional dresses of Skalat in Galician Podillia

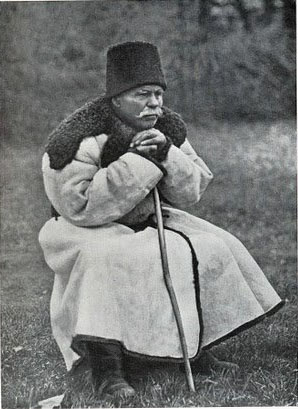
Podillian man wearing a kozhukh

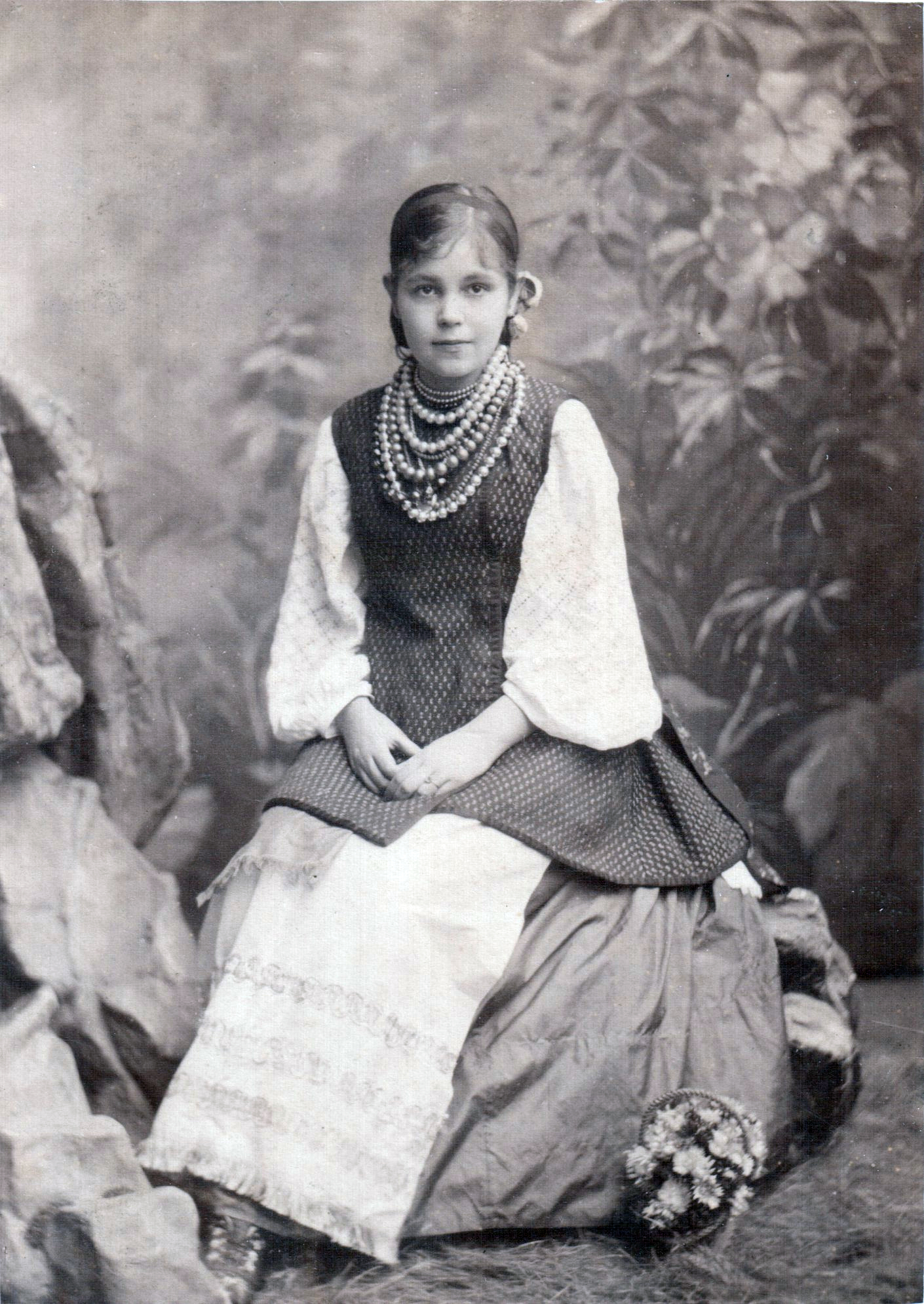
Liudmyla Starytska-Cherniakhivska in the folk costume of Dnieper Ukraine, 1882

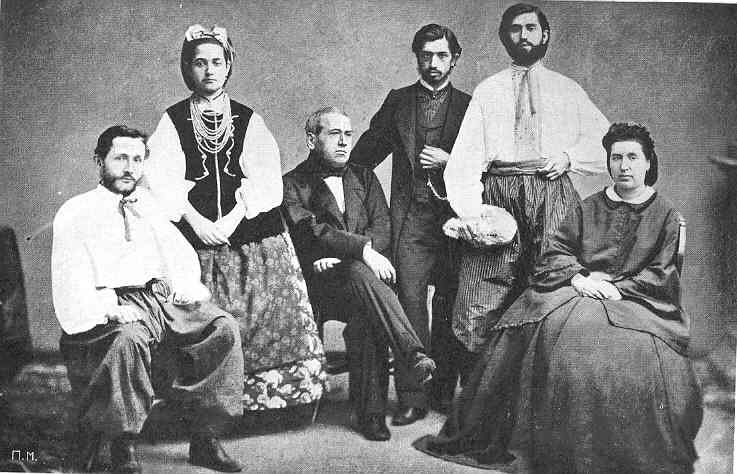
Alchevsky family in folk costumes of Sloboda Ukraine

=== Steppe ===
The Ukrainian Steppe comprises Budjak, the Odesa Region, the Lower Dnieper, Tauria, the Sea of Azov region and Crimea. It includes many influences from Moldovan, Bulgarian, Greek, Crimean Tatar and Russian traditional clothing, but the information about the dress of the early steppe Ukrainians is very limited.

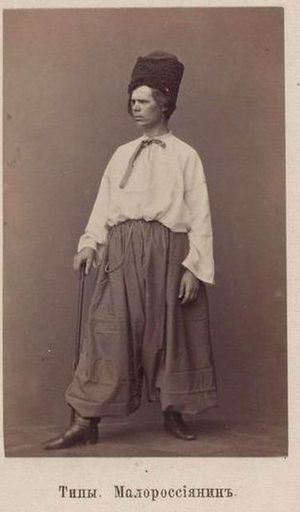
Man in a traditional Zaporozhian Cossack dress including sharovary, 1865

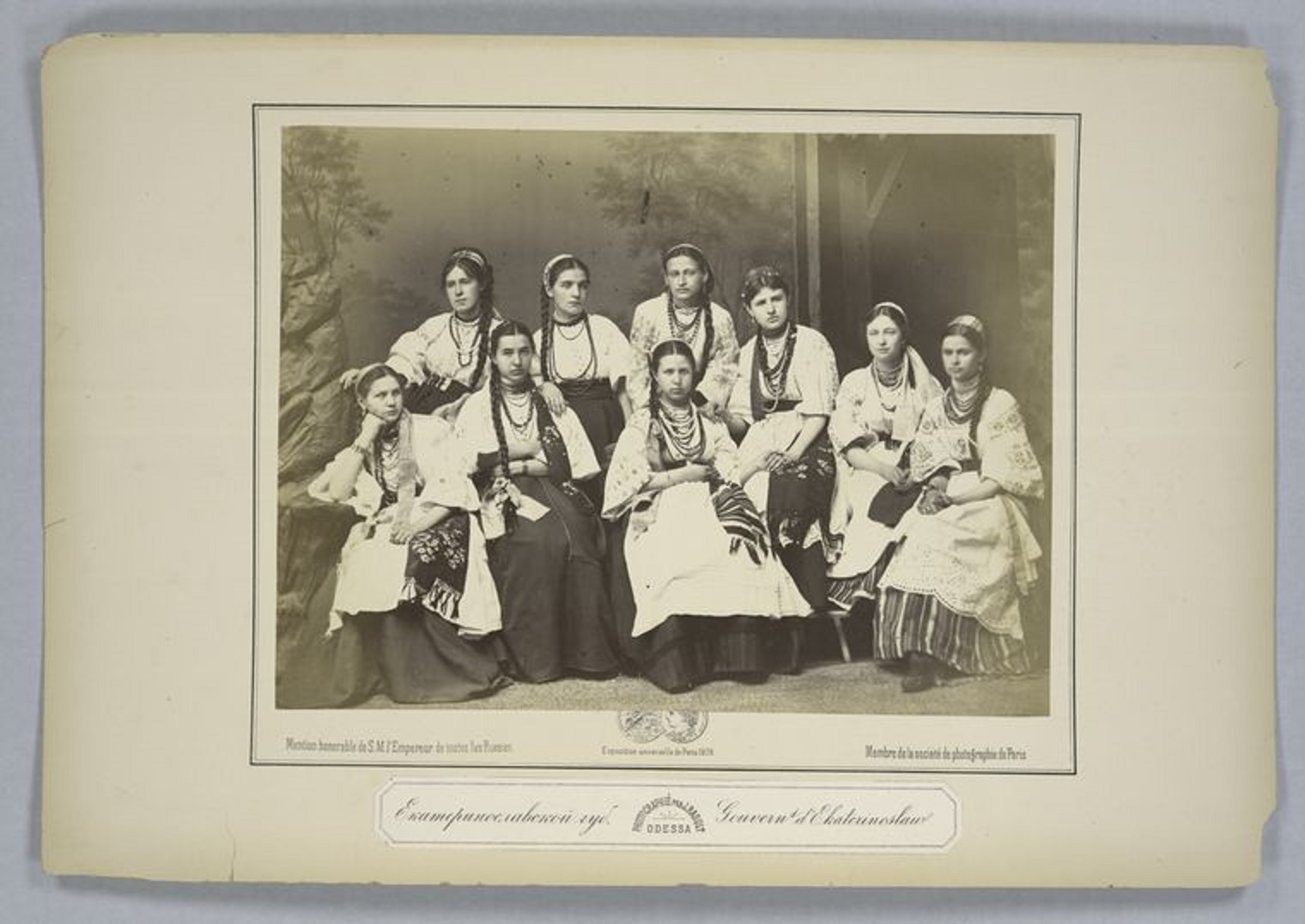
Women from Katerynoslav Governorate, latter half of the 19th century

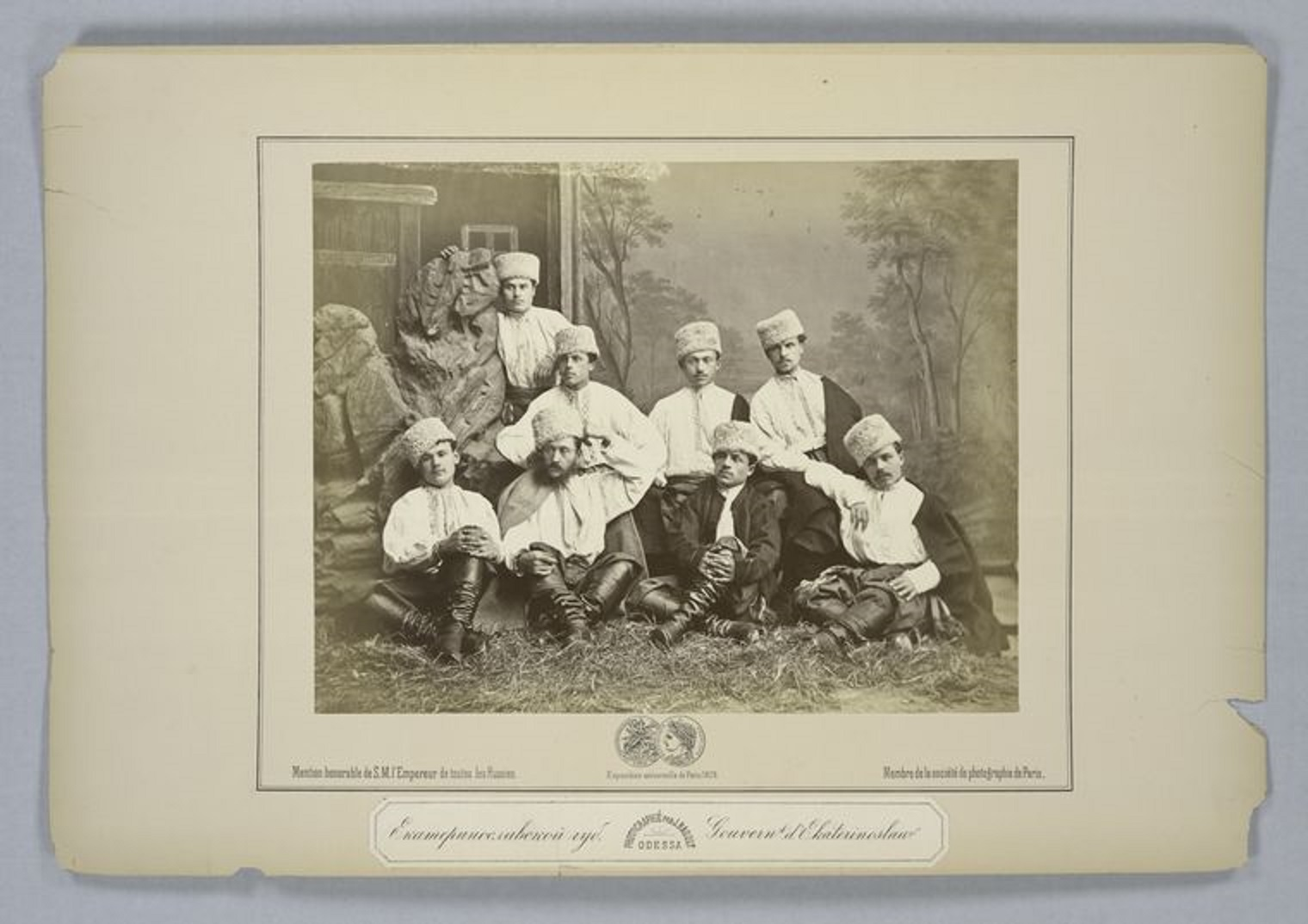
Men from Katerynoslav Governorate

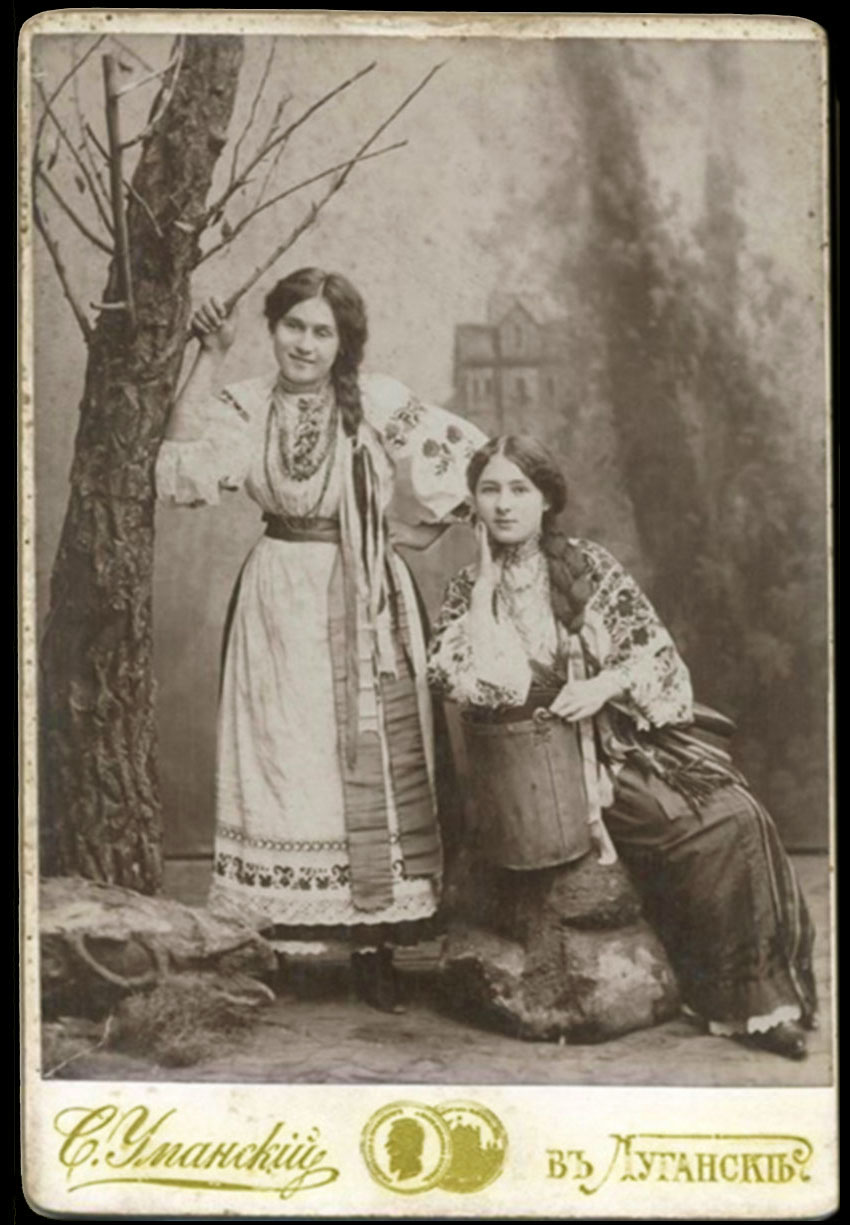
Ukrainian girls from Luhansk, around 1900

=== Carpathians ===
The Carpathian macroregion includes the Lemko Region, Boyko Region, Transcarpathia, Pokuttia, Hutsulshchina and Bukovina. Local clothing traditions carry influences from Polish, Slovak, Hungarian and Romanian clothing. The Carpathian embroidery is colourful and includes many floral motifs.

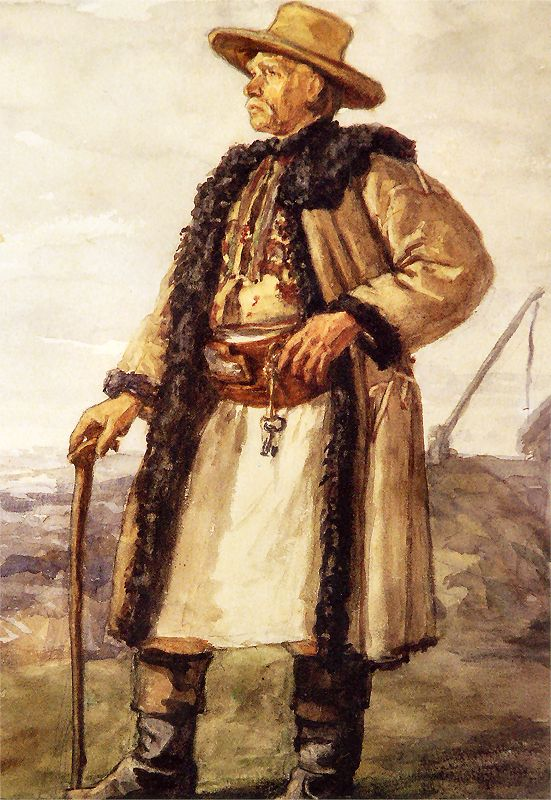
Portrait of a village elder from the region of Pokuttia, 1867

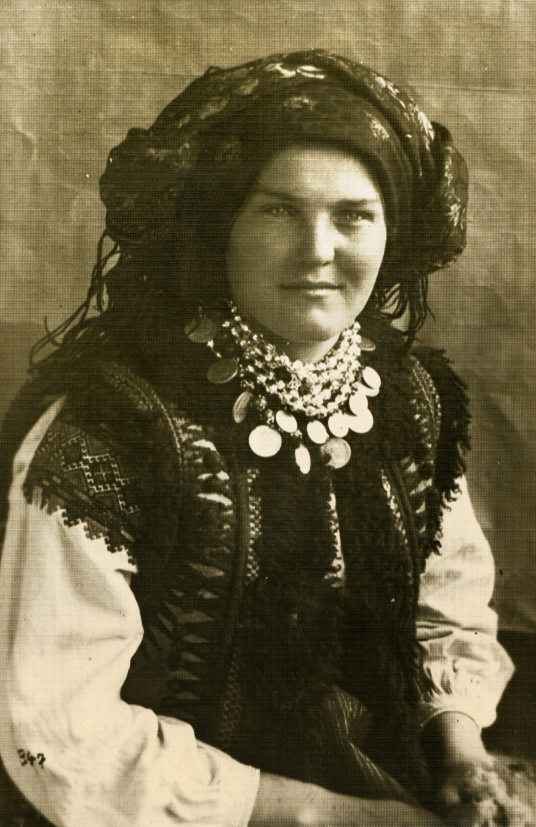
Portrait of a Hutsul woman

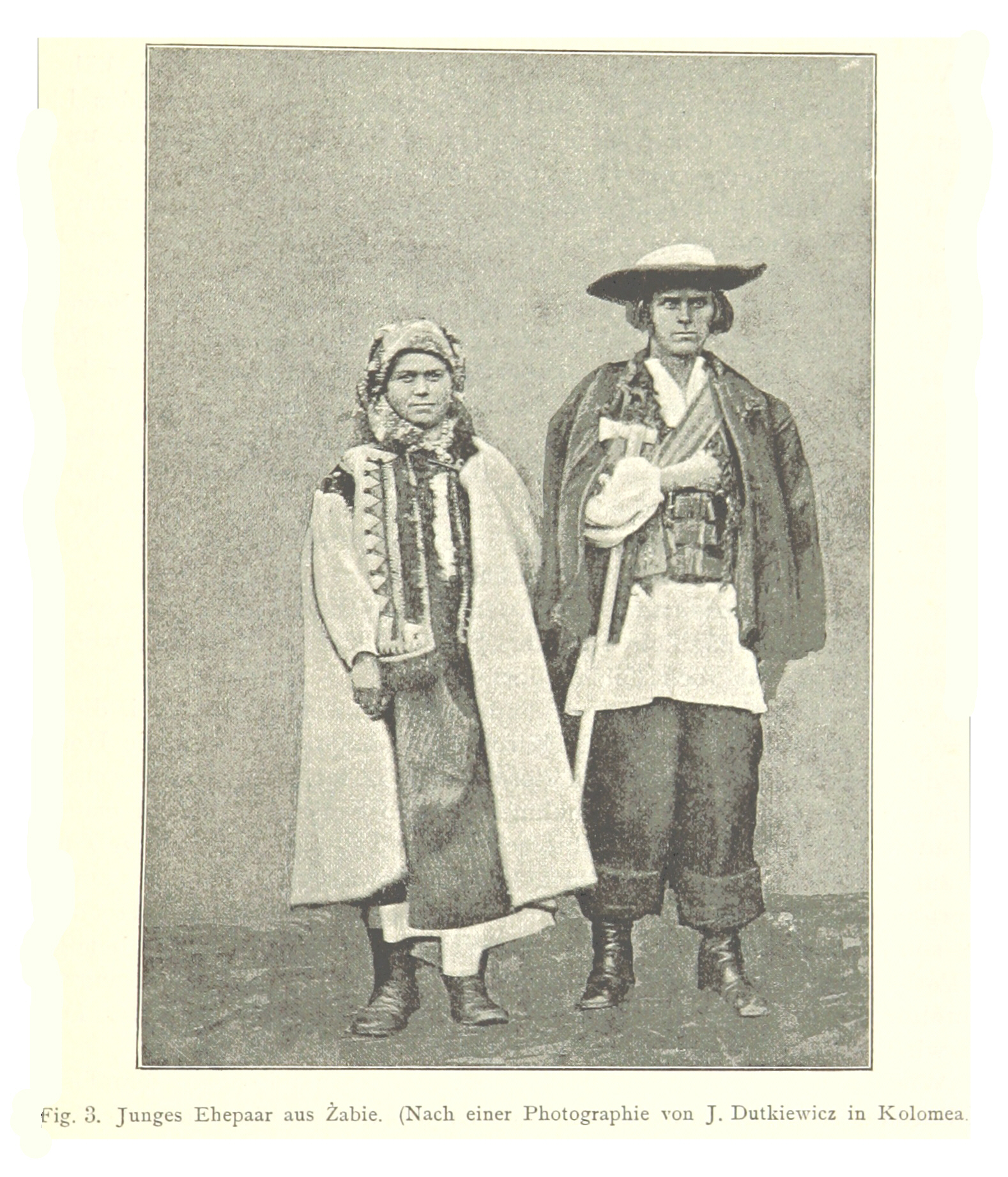
Hutsuls from Zhabye, late 19th century

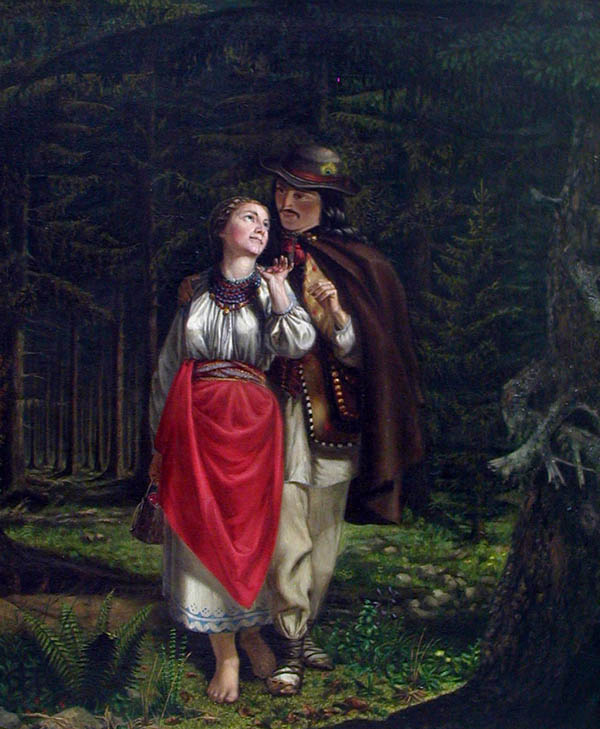
A Boyko couple in traditional dress on a painting by Kornylo Ustiyanovych

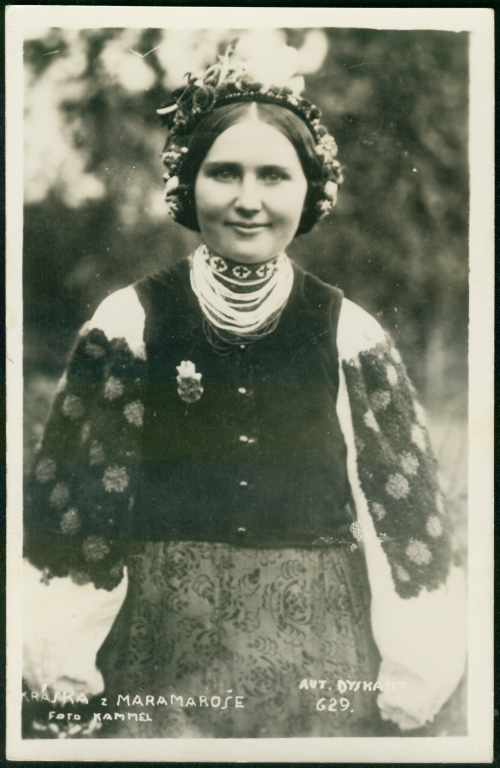
Rusyn girl from Marmarosh in Transcarpathia
