= Ochipok =

Ukrainian married woman's headdress

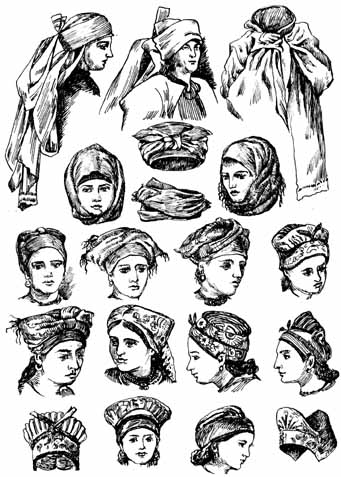
Traditional Ukrainian headdress

The ochipok (Ukrainian: очіпок, also намітка, namitka; перемітка, peremitka; серпанок, serpanok; рантух, rantukh; склендячка, sklendyachka; хустка, khustka) is a married woman's headdress as part of traditional Ukrainian folk dress, often decorated with embroidery. It is a cap that covers the entire head with a slit in the back and laces that pull it tightly around the head.

They were mainly worn by women in the middle Dnieper River region, including the Left-Bank and steppe areas, however the ochipok was also used in other regions of Ukraine. It is thought to have originated during the Hetmanate period. The specific characteristics of the ochipok varied from region to region.

In Europe in the Middle Ages, uncovered hair was a sign of virginity. A married woman covered her hair completely, including forehead, ears and often the neck.

Namitka is a long, thin fabric wrapped around the head and tied in the back. It was the original Slavic head covering for men and women, and could be used to cover the face. Eventually, it gave rise to the Russian kokoshnik. The ends of the fabric are embroidered, usually with red thread.

During the Ukrainian wedding ceremony, the bride's hair was covered by an ochipok and namitka. She would wear the ochipok for the rest of her life with various types of headgear on top of it.

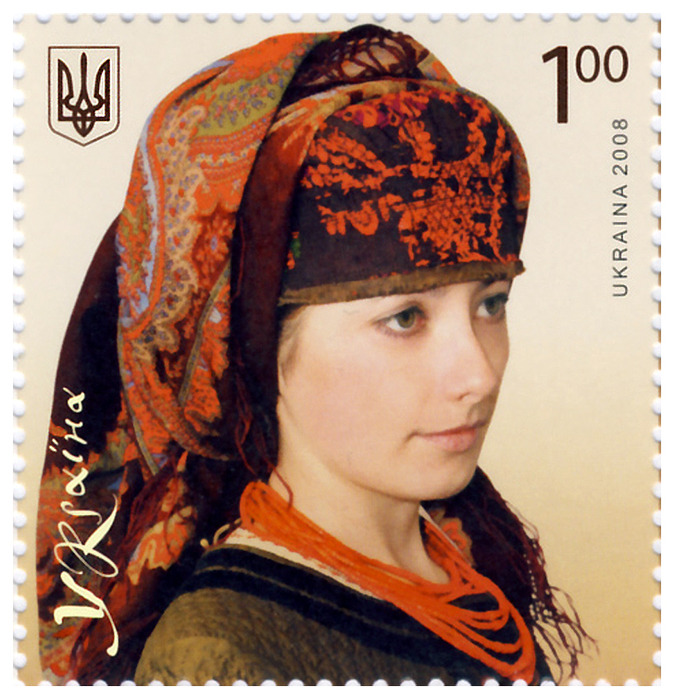
Ochipok and kerchief from Cherkasy

Peremitka is part of traditional Hutsul dress. It is a long strip of cloth ornamented on both ends and tied with a knot on each side. It is worn wrapped around the hair, neck, and chin.

Bavnytsia is an embroidered ring of cloth fitted around the head, open at the top, with a ring of fringe or gathers stitched to the top edge. It was covered with a namitka or a kerchief. Bavnytsia was traditional dress in Galicia.

Instructions and examples of traditional Ukrainian headgear are on display at the Ivan Honchar Museum In Kyiv.

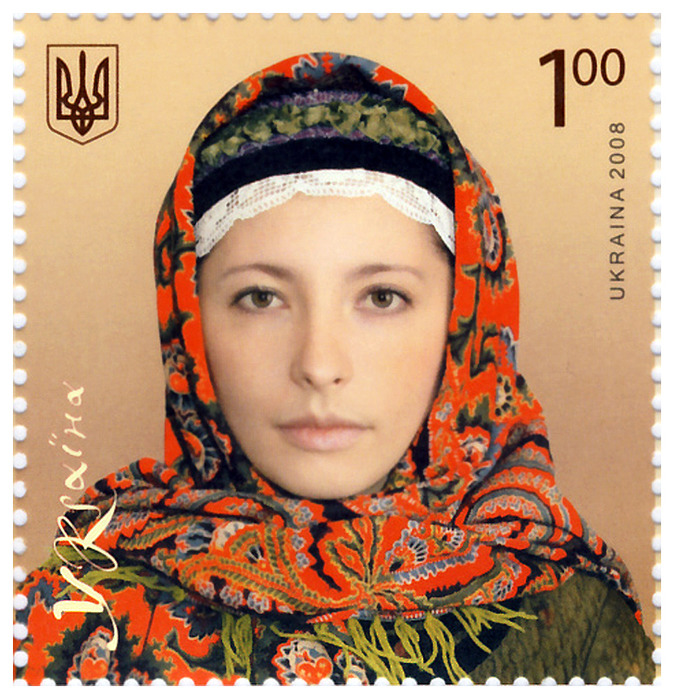
Ochipok and kerchief from Lviv

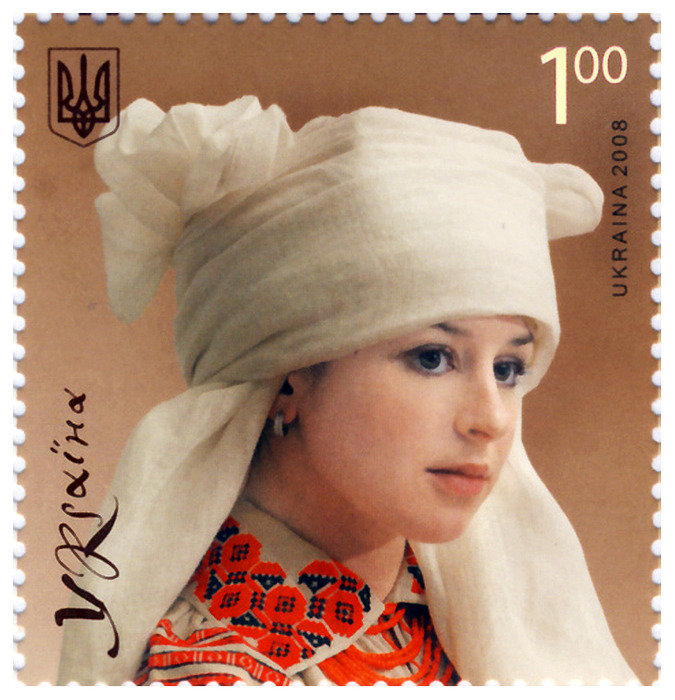
Namitka from Rivne

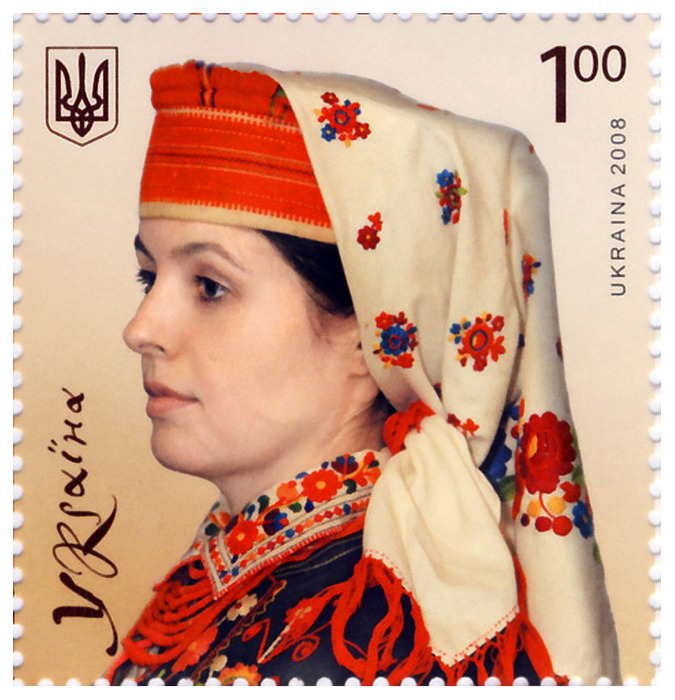
Bavnytsia and kerchief, from Lviv

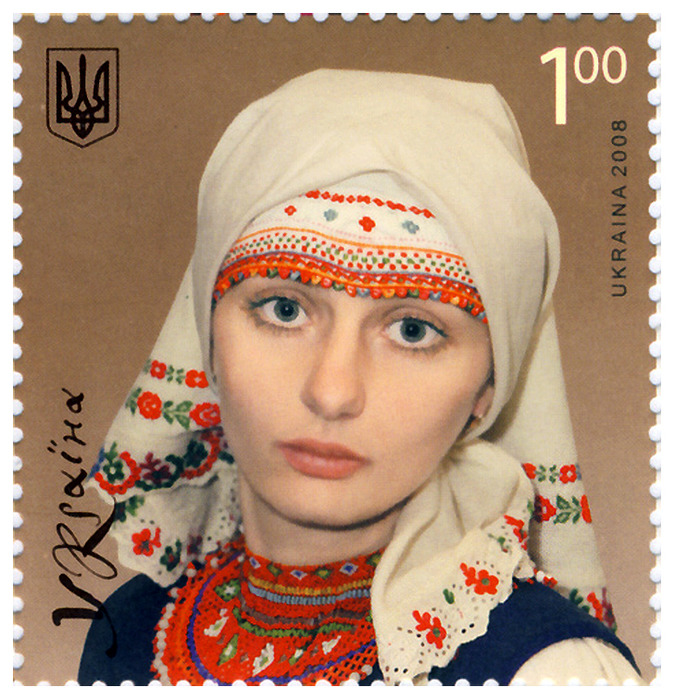
Caul and kerchief

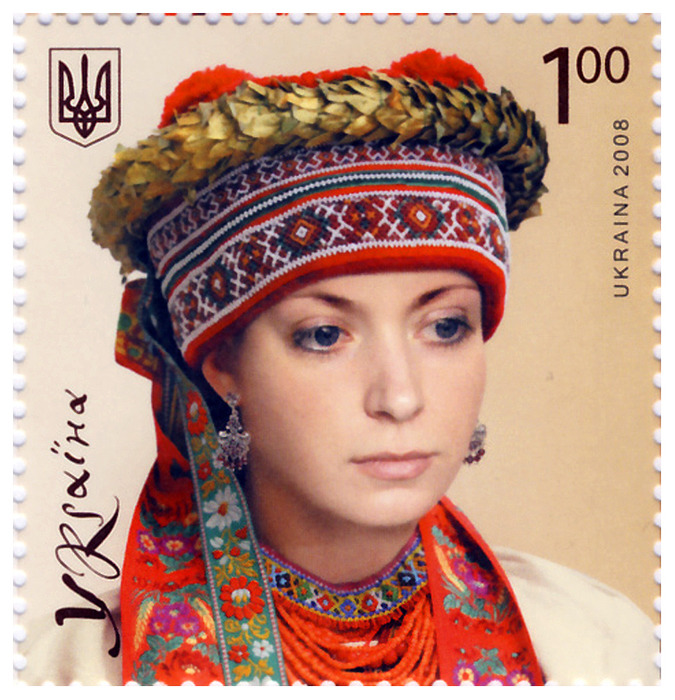
Bavnytsia, Pokuttia

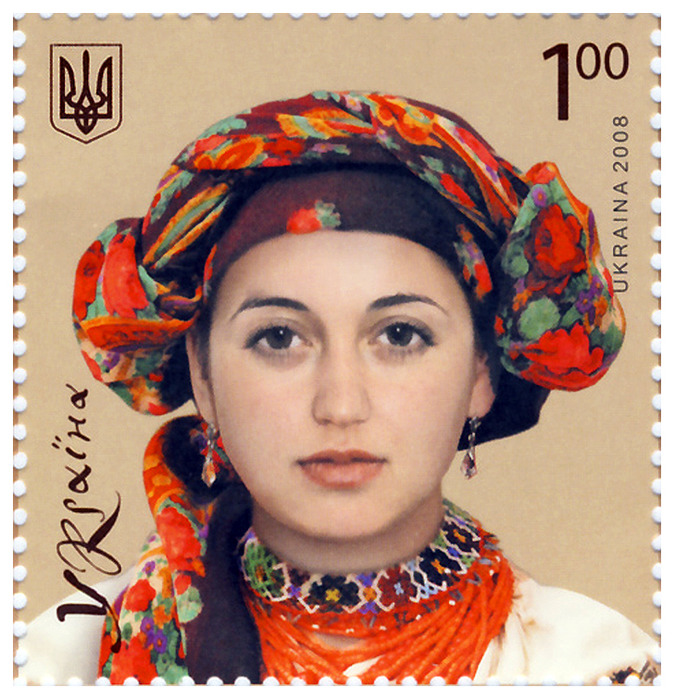
Peremitka Hutsul style

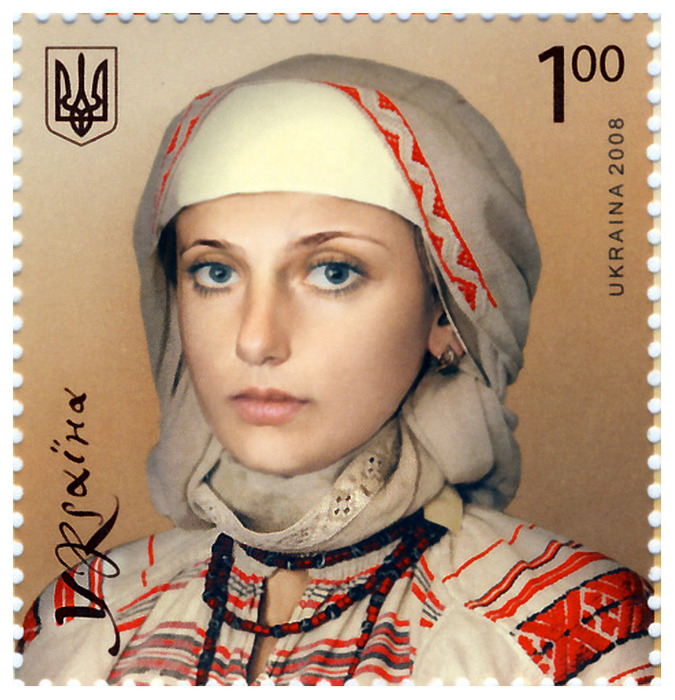
Ochipok and peremitka

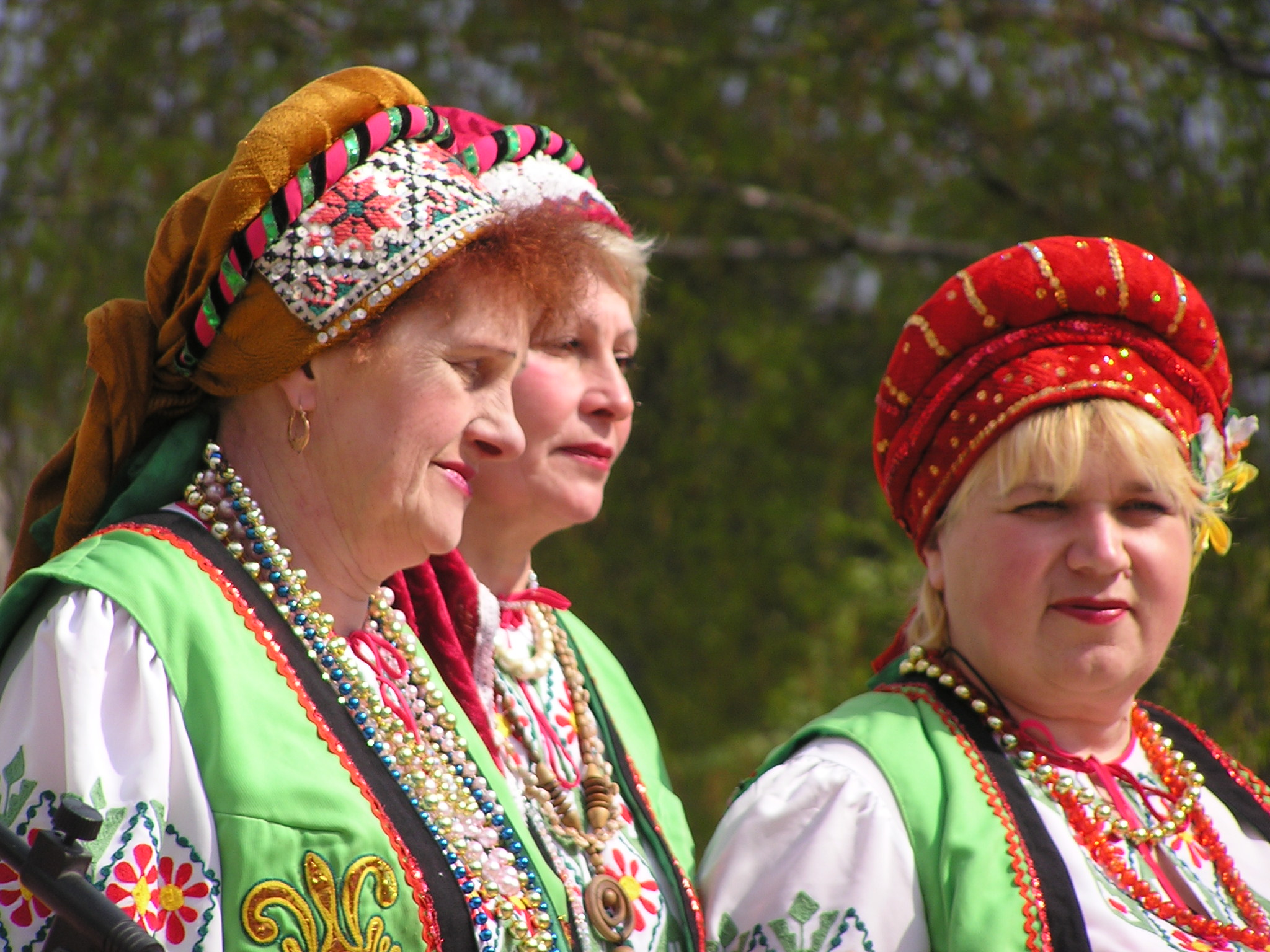
Bavnytsia, Donetsk

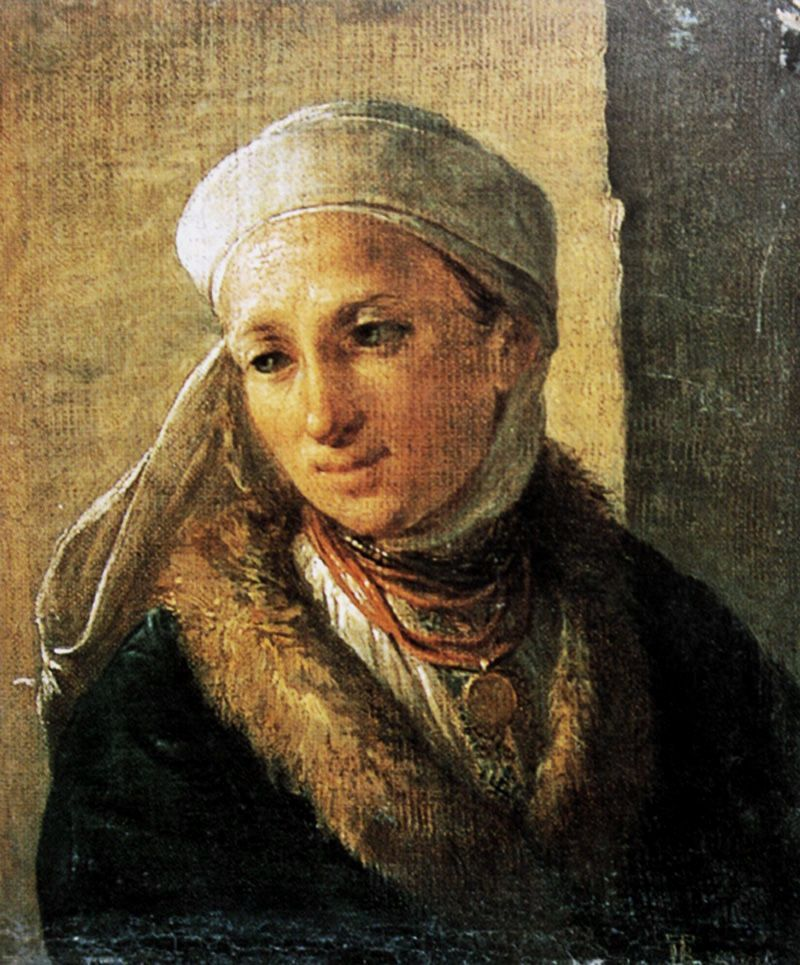
Namitka, 1820

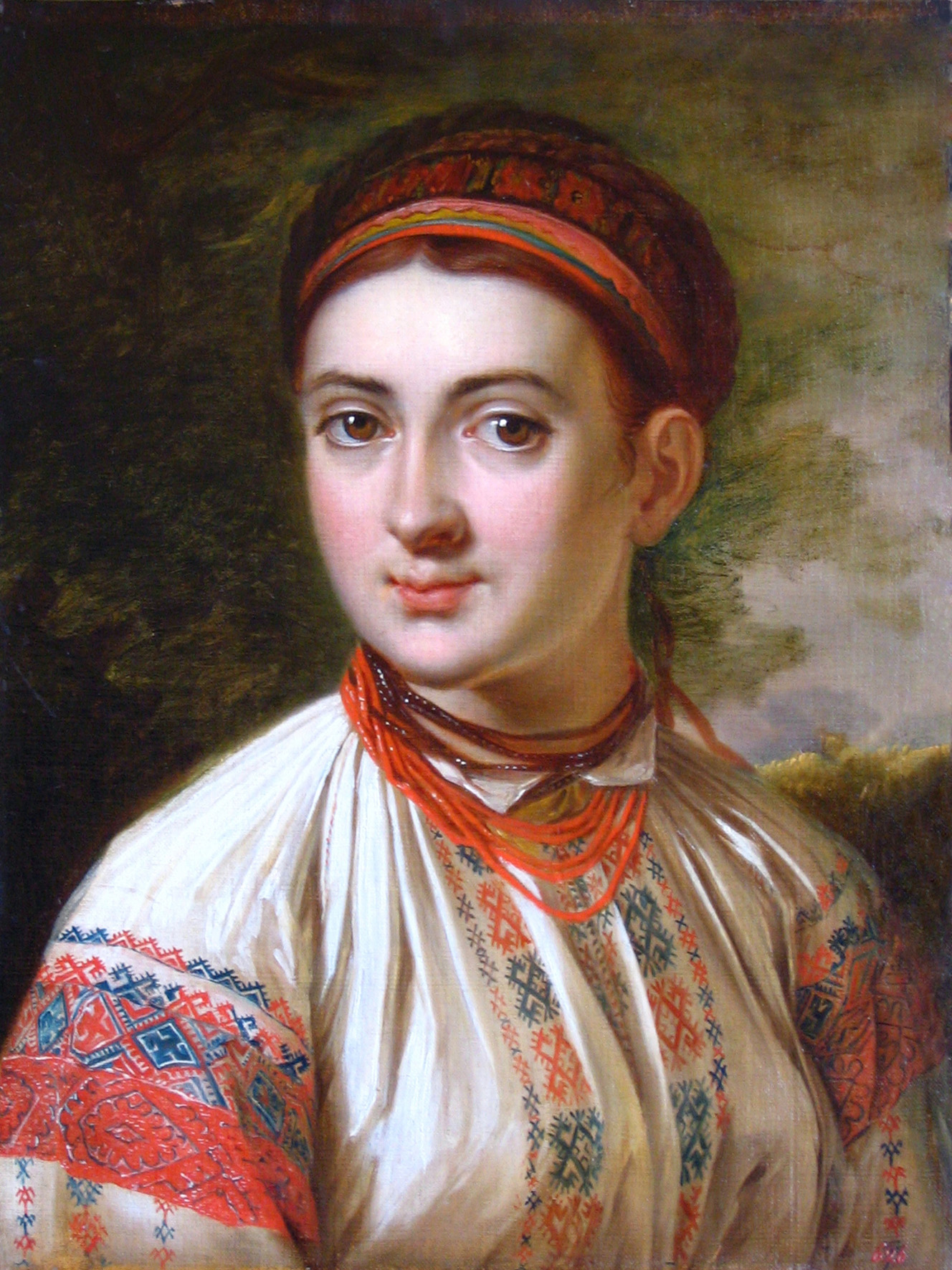
Girl from Podillya c. 1800 by Vasily Tropinin

== See also ==
- Vinok
- Kokoshnik
- Temple ring
- List of hat styles
- List of headgear
