= Alchevsky =

Alchevsky is a surname and may refer to:

- Hryhory Alchevsky (Григорій Олексійович Алчевський; 1866–1920), Ukrainian composer
- Oleksiy Alchevsky (Алчевський Олексій Кирилович; 1835–1901), Ukrainian entrepreneur, philanthropist, and industrialist
