= Raid on Balta =

- Part of the Koliivshchyna
Date	June 1768
Location	Balta, Ottoman Empire (now Ukraine)
Result	Haidamak victory: The onset of the diplomatic crisis between Russia and the Ottoman Empire and its escalation into War

Belligerents
Haidamaks (disputed, see Aftermath)	Ottoman Empire; Crimean Khanate

Commanders and leaders
Semen Shylo	Yakub-aga Rudzevich

Casualties and losses
Unknown	Entire garrison killed
- About a thousand civilians killed

The Raid on Balta (Ukrainian: Напад на Балту) was a military action by the insurgent Haidamaks as a part of Koliivshchyna, when the Haidamak rebel units attacked the city of Balta, which at the time was a part of the Ottoman Empire, defeated the Tatar garrison in the city and sacked it.

== Background ==
In response to the szlachta's repression against the Ruthenians, a large uprising, known as Koliivshchyna began, the rebels captured a large part of the Right-Bank Ukraine, including Smila, Korsun, Zhabotyn and Cherkasy. The Haidamaks committed mass murders against the Polish and Jewish population of the Right-Bank Ukraine, which forced the civilians to escape, sometimes to the Ottoman territory.

== Attack ==
In mid-June 1768, soon after the massacre at Uman, a detachment of Zalizniak's haidamaks was pursuing some Confederates through Podolia toward the Kodyma River. According to other version, the Haidamaks entered the Ottoman territory after the kaymak of Balta refused to give up the Poles who had attacked the village of Paliyeve Ozero together with Tatars before this. The Haidamaks had entered the town of Balta on the Moldavian side of the border, defeated the Tatar garrison and killed approximately a thousand civilians. Another unit of Haidamaks led by colonel Nezhyvyi attacked the town of Golta near Balta and massacred Poles and Jews there.

== Aftermath and controversy ==
Following the attack, Insurgents murdered the Jewish civilians in the city and retreated on the Haidamak-controlled territory. Haidamak action became a pretext for the new Russo-Turkish War. It is not certain about who were actual perpetrators. Several sources claim that the perpetrators were Haidamaks who were chasing the Confederates, however some sources claim that the attack was carried by the Zaporozhian Cossacks on the service of Russia. It is also mentioned that the hetman of Ottoman Ukraine, Yakub-aga Rudzevich caused the attack himself and then sent false claims about the "Cossack raid", which caused the crisis and eventually a war between the Russia and the Ottoman Empire.
