= George (Konissky) =

Orthodox archbishop, preacher, philosopher and theologian

- Archbishop of Mogilev, Mstsislaw and Orsha
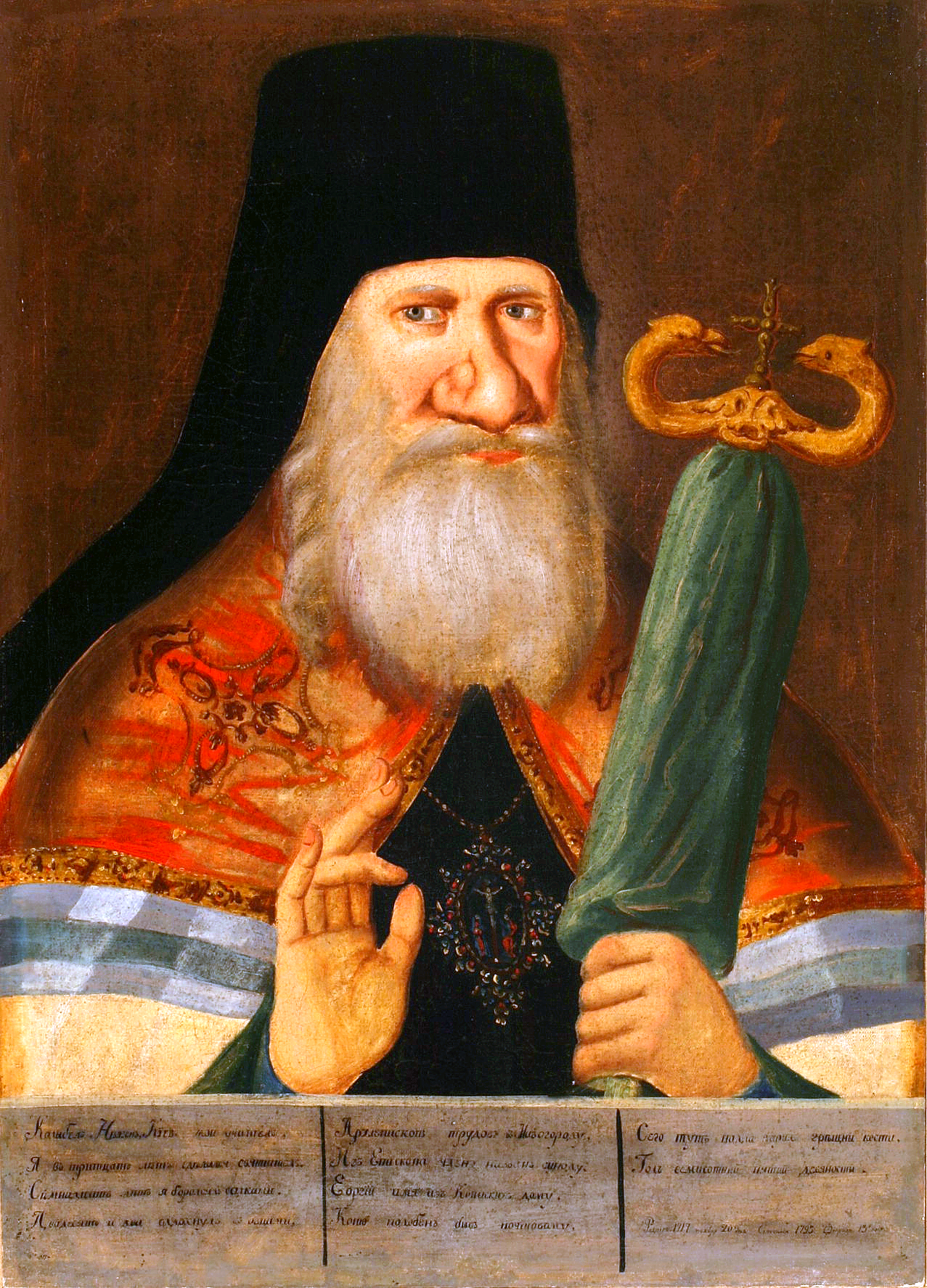
- Native name: Григорій Кониський
- Church: Russian Orthodox Church
- Diocese: Eparchy of Mogilev, Mstsislaw and Orsha
- Appointed: 1755
- In office: 1783–1795

Orders
- Ordination: 20 August 1755
- Consecration: 11 August 1744

Personal details
- Born: Grigori Konissky; 20 November 1717 Nizhyn, Cossack Hetmanate, Tsardom of Russia (now Ukraine)
- Died: 12 February 1795 (aged 77) Mogilev, Russian Empire (now Belarus)
- Denomination: Eastern Orthodoxy

George, secular name Grigori Osipovich Konissky (Russian: Григорий Осипович Конисский, Ukrainian: Григорій Осипович Кониський, romanized: Hryhorii Osypovych Konys'kyi; born November 20, 1717 in Nezhin, died 13 February [O.S. 2 February] 1795 in Mogilyov) was an Orthodox archbishop, preacher, philosopher and theologian.

He was the son of the mayor of Nezhin. He graduated from the Academia Mohileana and later became a lecturer there. He taught poetics, philosophy and theology successively, and in 1751 he assumed the duties of its rector. Three years later he was ordained Bishop of Mstsislaw, Mogilev and Orsha, and became Ordinary of the last Orthodox eparchy within the borders of the First Republic.

Sincerely devoted to Russia, from 1762 he played a significant role in Tsarina Catherine II's policy toward the Republic, collaborating with Russian MP Nikolai Repnin in the campaign for the equality of dissidents. Defending the rights of the Orthodox population was only a pretext for the tsarina to intervene in the internal affairs of the Republic. At the same time, Bishop George acted in defense of the state of possession of the Orthodox Church in the Republic, and on several occasions addressed the Polish kings with memoranda listing the losses suffered by his denomination as a result of the activities of the Roman Catholic and Uniate Churches. He unsuccessfully demanded the legalization of conversion from Catholicism (of both rites) to Orthodoxy. He was one of the founders of the Słuck Confederation. In 1767, he published in Warsaw the Prawa i wolności dyssydentów w nabożeństwie chrześcijańskim w Koronie Polskiej i Wielkim Xięstwie Litewskim. In 1768, he contributed to the outbreak of Koliivshchyna; he and the clergy under him urged Orthodox peasants and haidamakas to rise up against the Bar Confederation, in which he saw a direct threat to his religion.

Ordination history of George
History
Episcopal consecration
- Principal consecrator: Timothy (Scherbatsky)
- Co-consecrators: Irakli (Komarowsky), Jan (Kozlowicz)
- Date: August 20, 1755
- Place: Kyiv, Saint Sophia Cathedral

After the First Partition of Poland, he continued his pastoral work in Mogilev already within the borders of the Russian Empire, but maintained contacts with the Orthodox clergy of the Republic of Poland and, until the end of his life, conducted diplomatic and propaganda activities to improve the situation of his co-religionists in that country. A staunch opponent of the Uniate Church, in 1780, with the support of the tsarist administration, he led to the closure of a number of its parishes in the Mogilev and Mstsislaw lands and the transition of more than 100,000 believers to the Russian Orthodox Church.

Author of textbooks and treatises on Orthodox dogmatic and moral theology, textbooks on poetics and philosophy, homilies, polemical texts against Catholicism, as well as literary works. He wrote in Latin, Russian and Polish.

In 1993 he was canonized by the Belarusian Orthodox Church as a locally venerated saint in the Mogilev and Mstsislaw eparchies. Since 2011, his cult has also been functioning in the Ukrainian Orthodox Church of the Moscow Patriarchate.

== Early life ==
=== Youth and early activities ===
The Konissky family belonged to the Russian nobility. The future hierarch's father, Joseph, was mayor of Nizhyn. From 1728 (or 1738) he attended the Kyiv Mohyla Academy. During his education, he excelled in Latin, Greek, Hebrew, German and Polish. After graduating from the school in 1744, he became a professor of poetics there a year later.

According to various sources, he took his perpetual monastic vows while he was still a student, on 11 April 1744, at the hands of Kiev Metropolitanate Raphael, or only in 1749, when he had already served as prefect of the Mogilev Academy and as a philosophy lecturer for two years. Monk George was ordained a priest in 1747. In 1750 he took part in drafting the revised curriculum of the Mogilev Academy, as well as the detailed content of individual courses.

In 1751 he became rector of the academy and held the position for four years. At that time he also began teaching theology at the academy. At the same time he was the superior of the Brotherhood Monastery in Kiev. In 1752 he received the title of archimandrite.

=== Bishop ===
==== Occupation of the Belarusian cathedral ====
On 14 October 1754, Jerome, the Orthodox Bishop of Mstsislaw, Mogilev and Orsha (Belarusian), head of the only Orthodox administration in the Polish-Lithuanian Commonwealth, died suddenly. After his death, Uniate Metropolitanate Florian Hrebnicki made a determined effort to subjugate the last Orthodox pastoral posts in the country. Appealing to the king to incorporate the Belarusian eparchy into the Archeparchy of Polotsk-Vitebsk, he used a false privilege from Sigismund III Vasa, who supposedly sanctioned this solution. The document was a blatant forgery, since the Belarusian eparchy was not erected until 1633, when Sigismund III Vasa was already dead. Nevertheless, the efforts of Metropolitanate Florian Hrebnicki were supported by Pope Benedict XIV, who sent a papal brief to King August III demanding the liquidation of the Belarusian eparchy by incorporating it into the Uniate Church.

The efforts of the Catholic bishops were opposed by Tsarina Elisabeth of Russia. August III, under pressure from Gross, the Russian deputy in Warsaw, confirmed the rights of the Orthodox to the eparchies of Mstsislaw, Mogilev and Orsha. In an agreement between the Russian side and the Republic, a candidate was named as its new Ordinary, who became George (Konissky). The King granted him the privilege of the Belarusian bishopric on 23 March 1755; according to another source, this did not happen until 3 June 1755. On 23 May of the same year, the Most Holy Synod of the Russian Orthodox Church announced his episcopal appointment. The episcopal chirotony, on the other hand, took place on August 20 of the same year at Kiev's Saint Sophia Cathedral. Metropolitanate of Kyiv, Timothy, took part in the rite as the main consecrator. The bishop's ceremonial entry into Mogilev, where his residence was located, took place on October 26, 1755.

==== Pastoral activities in Mogilev ====
Immediately after taking office, George (Konissky) undertook intensive political activity in defense of Orthodoxy. He obtained funds for the ongoing development of the eparchy from Russia. As early as February 1756, he sent to the Most Holy Synod hieromonk, Johann of the Resurrection Monastery in Shklov, with letters informing them of the material situation of his administration. In them, he complained about the poor technical condition of the Cathedral Sobor of the Transfiguration in Mogilev and the bad impression the local Orthodox churches made compared to the well-maintained and lavish Catholic churches and Jewish schools. After sending to the Synod a project for the expansion of the cathedral, commissioned from architect Johann Christoph Glaubitz, Bishop George obtained a subsidy of 10,000 rubles for its expansion, but the money did not arrive in Mogilev until 1758. The hierarch received additional funds for the organization of a seminary in Mogilev; in his letter to the Synod, he pointed to the low intellectual level of the clergy and the lack of educated priests as a major problem.

In the first years after George (Konissky) took office as Belarusian bishop, there was an expansion of his authority to control monasteries located within the eparchy's borders. According to the acts of foundation, some of the monasteries operating in the territory under the authority of the Belarusian bishops were subordinated directly to the Constantinopolitan Patriarchs or their exarchs (Metropolitanates of Kiev). Attempts to change this situation and subordinate all monasteries located within the borders of the eparchy to its ordinaries had already been made by Bishop George's predecessors, but their efforts did not bring the expected result, and only caused competence disputes and personal conflicts that dragged on for years. Meanwhile, in 1756, Kyiv Metropolitanate Timothy relinquished control over the monasteries of Buinichi and Barkulabov and transferred his existing powers to the Belarusian bishop. Bishop George then asked him to make a similar decision with regard to the other monasteries with the same status. In a letter to the Metropolitanate of Kiev, he argued that only as the direct head of the monastic communities would he be able to bring the necessary discipline and order to them, citing cases of their violation in the monasteries of Tupichevshchina and Kutein near Orsha. The Belarusian hierarch's request was granted by Metropolitanate Timothy's successor at the Kyiv Cathedral, Metropolitanate Arsenius, in 1759. The solutions introduced in this regard were informal. Monasteries previously controlled by the Kiev metropolitans de iure remained under their jurisdiction; it was they who approved candidates for community superiors and had the right to dismiss them. De facto, the daily activities of the monasteries were supervised by the Belarusian bishop. Formally, the retention of the Kiev Metropolitanate's jurisdiction was intended to provide the monasteries with Russian protection and defense in the event that Catholics made claims against them.

The hierarch also made considerable efforts to erect and renovate Orthodox churches. He initiated the erection of a new consistory building and a bishop's palace. He put the eparchial records in order and created the first archive. In 1762 he consecrated the building of the Cathedral Sobor in Mogilev after completing its general renovation. He preached regularly, wishing to offset the influence of Jesuit and Dominican preachers. On many occasions he directly polemicized with Catholic clergy. His contemporaries considered him an excellent preacher.

Bishop George was particularly active in improving the moral and intellectual level of the clergy under his authority. He refused to ordain illiterate candidates or those who had not mastered Orthodox liturgical chant. In 1757, in a pastoral letter to all the clergy of the eparchy, he rated their competence low; he attached a Russian language textbook and a catechism to the letter. In order to educate future clergy, George (Konissky) established a seminary at the Transfiguration Monastery in Mogilev in 1759. However, this school did not begin operations until 1759, a year after the Most Holy Synod officially approved its establishment and set an annual subsidy of 400 rubles for it. The basis of the scientific and teaching staff of the institution was formed by graduates of the Mogilev Academy who came to Mogilev at the invitation of Bishop George.

The hierarch also organized parochial schools. During his tenure, such institutions were opened in Bykhaw, Gomel, Mstsislaw, Orsha and Rogachev, among others. Also in order to raise the intellectual level of the clergy and the faithful, Bishop George organized a printing press at the bishop's residence in Mogilev, where he published the Catechism of Novgorod Archbishop Theophan as early as 1757.

==== Conflicts with Catholics and local administration ====
Already upon his arrival in Mogilev, Bishop George found himself in serious conflict with the Catholic clergy and nobility. Polotsk Archbishop Florian Hrebnicki did not stop his efforts to take over the Belarusian eparchy and established a Uniate consistory in Mogilev. Catholic parish priest Michael Zenovich also worked against the Orthodox hierarch. In 1759, during the bishop's visit to the Kutein Monastery in Orsha, there were speeches by Catholic clergy and nobles against his person; in 1759 and 1760 there were unsuccessful attempts on his life. A year later, priest Zenovich, together with local Jesuits, organized an attack on the seminary in Mogilev and the bishop's residence. In September 1760, the hierarch wrote to the Most Holy Synod that the seminary regularly falls victim to acts of intolerance and therefore cannot function normally. As the bishop wrote, the authorities of the Republic accepted this state of affairs, citing the fact that the Treaty of Perpetual Peace of 1686 made no mention of the functioning of Orthodox theological schools. George (Konissky) remained in constant dispute with the Polish administration.

At the same time, Bishop George consistently worked for the complete subordination of the Belarusian eparchy to the Russian Orthodox Church. He urged the clergy to recognize the supremacy of the Most Holy Synod. During his tenure as Bishop of Mstsislaw, Mogilev and Orsha, Russia's influence on the legal position of the Orthodox in the Republic, as well as on their political attitudes, increased significantly.

Discouraged by escalating disputes with the Uniate clergy, in 1762, Bishop George asked the Most Holy Synod to transfer to another cathedral. The Synod accepted his request and proposed him the Diocese of Pskov. However, the decision to transfer was not accepted by the new Russian Tsarina Catherine II.

==== Activities during the reign of Catherine II ====
===== Residence in Russia =====
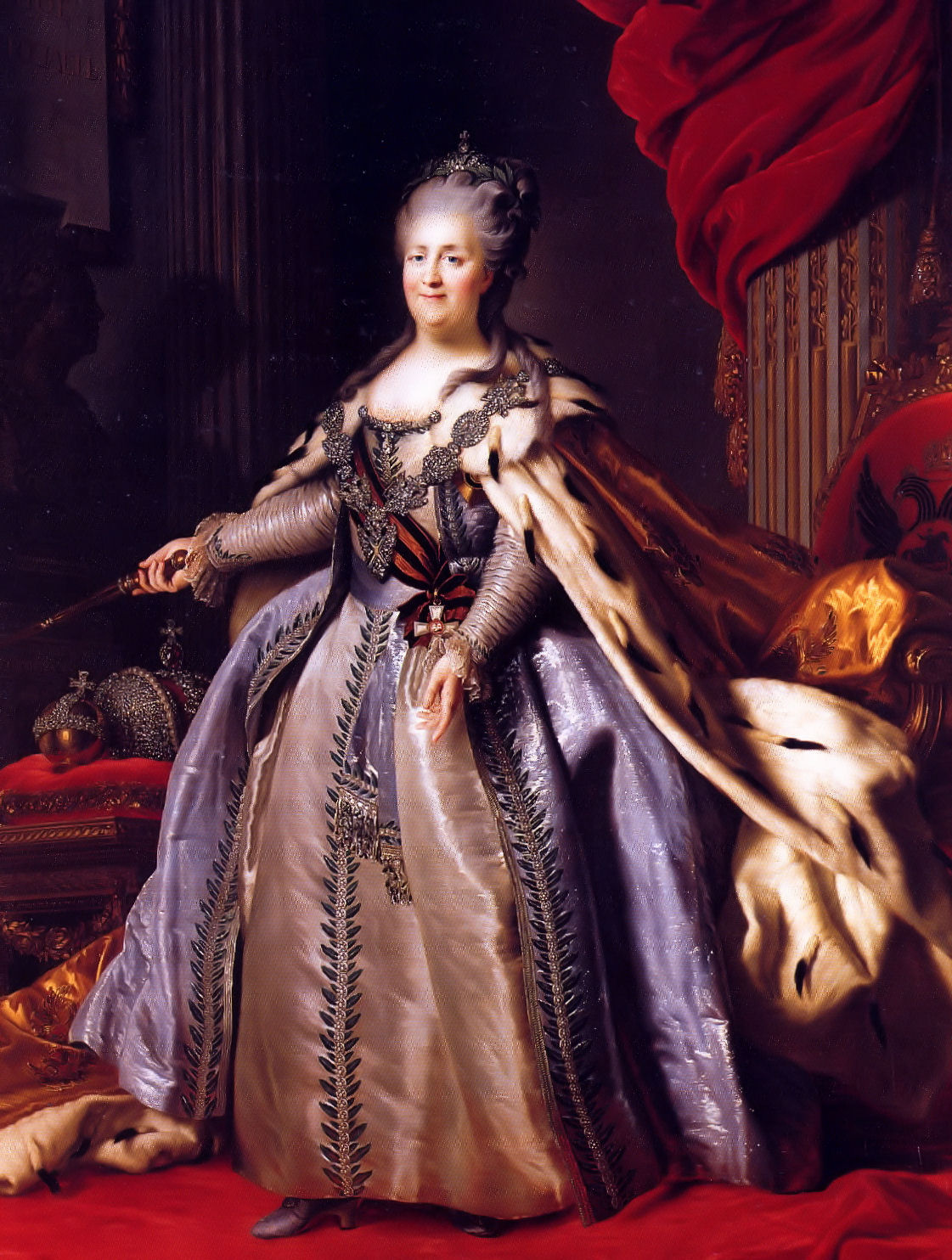
Tsarina Catherine II used the issue of the Orthodox in the Republic as a pretext for intervening in the internal affairs of the Republic. Jerzy (Konissky) took an active part in her efforts to promote the rights of dissidents

In 1762, he traveled to Moscow for the coronation of Catherine II and there, on October 10, delivered a speech of allegiance in which he encouraged the tsarina to defend Orthodoxy in Poland. He addressed a similar speech to her son. Catherine II was not a religious person herself, but she saw the lack of equality for Orthodox in the Republic as a good excuse to intervene in the country's domestic politics. George (Konissky) was sincerely devoted to Russia and completely supported Catherine II's policy in this regard. From Moscow he went to St. Petersburg and remained in that city until 1765, as he feared for his safety and claimed that he did not see what benefit his return to Mogilev could bring. In February 1763, based on documents gathered by the Belarusian bishop and by Kiev's Metropolitanate Arsenius, the Most Holy Synod formulated a petition to the tsarina, once again asking her to come to the defense of Orthodox believers in the Republic.

In the absence of Bishop George in the Republic, the Uniate hierarchy renewed its efforts to abolish the Belarusian Orthodox eparchy. The new Archbishop of Polotsk and Metropolitanate of Kiev, Jason Smogorzewski, supported by Pope Clement XII, issued several decrees addressed to the Orthodox faithful and clergy. He also appealed to the king to incorporate the Belarusian eparchy into the Uniate Church. These efforts did not cease even in 1764, when it was already clear that Bishop George would not remain permanently in Russia. He returned to the Republic at the express request of the Tsarina herself.

===== Actions on dissidents =====
Immediately after his return, in 1765, he went to Warsaw with a letter of recommendation from Catherine II. In the letter, the tsarina included a demand to confirm the rights of George (Konissky) to administer the Belarusian eparchy and all the rights of the Orthodox population. He appeared in the Polish capital on July 22, 1765, and five days later he was received by King Stanisław August Poniatowski. Acting in concert with the Russian MP in Warsaw, Nikolai Repnin (Serchik even calls him an advisor in matters of the Orthodox population), he presented the Polish government with a twenty-point memorandum in which he demanded religious and political equality for Orthodox believers, as well as depicting their current situation as very bad, and polemicized with the Uniate hierarchy in this regard. As evidence of the persecution of the Orthodox, he cited, among other things, the deprivation of three dioceses from them, which were incorporated into the Uniate Church, the seizure of some 200 religious buildings by that Church after 1686, the coercion of the faithful to accept Catholicism in the Eastern rite, the unlawful seizure of Orthodox church land and its transfer to Jewish tenants, discrimination against the Orthodox in the courts, and the public vilification of the Orthodox by the Latin and Uniate clergy. His memorandum was based on documents collected by the bishop himself (royal privileges, acts related to the ownership of individual temples). Thus, he joined Catherine II's diplomatic action in the dissident cause. Bishop George also demanded the return of the property of the Belarusian eparchy seized by the great Lithuanian writer Antoni Michał Pac – the villages of Pechersk, Borsuki, Ćwirków and Tarasowicze. (Note: Elsewhere in the same monograph, Mironovich indicates that Tarasovichi, Borsuki and Pechersk were voluntarily given to the Uniates in exchange for relinquishing their claim to the Transfiguration Monastery in Mogilev. (Mironowicz A. (2008). Diecezja białoruska w XVII i XVIII wieku. Wydawnictwo Uniwersytetu w Białymstoku. p. 265. ISBN 978-83-7431-150-2.)) He accused the royal administration of violating the rights of Mogilev's Orthodox burghers and the clergy of that denomination. He also demanded that in mixed marriages there should be no cases of forcing an Orthodox spouse to convert to Catholicism and forcing the baptism of children in churches. Finally, he called for Orthodox townspeople to be admitted to municipal offices and for conversion from the Uniate Church to Orthodoxy to be legalized. Attached to the memorandum was Rejestr monasterów i cerkwi Grecko-ruskich różnemi czasy na unię gwałtownie odjętych, sporządzony junii die 3, Anno 1765. The King forwarded this document to the Uniate hierarchy for consultation. The bishops of the Uniate Church stated that George's (Konissky's) accusations were unfounded. The Orthodox hierarch issued his reply and demanded the establishment of a special commission to investigate the situation of the Orthodox. Despite the protest of the Uniate Church, the royal chancellery acceded to the demand for a separate investigation into the disputed issues. However, Bishop George did not believe in conducting it fairly. He resigned from participating in the proceedings, and in a letter to the king stated that the wronged Orthodox did not demand satisfaction, but only an improvement in their situation in the future. Among other things, in connection with this, Repnin wrote to the tsarina about the little results of the speeches made so far on the issue of dissenters.

However, Bishop George's actions led to the royal chancellery recognizing the rights of the Orthodox Church to operate a seminary at the Epiphany Monastery in Mogilev, confirming the property privileges of the parishes and monasteries of the Belarusian eparchy, and calling on priest Zenovich to stop disseminating anti-Orthodox pasquinades. In October 1765, the bishop also won a lawsuit over the property of the Belarusian eparchy and dismissed the claims of the Uniate Church to it.

At the 1766 Sejm, he was the only representative of the Orthodox Church to sign the dissidents' petition. Acting as an advisor to Ambassador Repnin, he submitted another memorandum to the king, demanding the return of Orthodox churches seized by the Uniates, the right to hold services freely, the subjection of Orthodox clergy to secular courts rather than the canonical courts of the Catholic Church, the admission of the Orthodox to offices, the recognition of mixed marriages and the adoption of the principle of children adopting the religion of the same-sex parent. At the same Sejm, the Russian and Prussian ambassadors jointly demanded the abolition of the law forbidding non-Catholics from holding state offices and positions. The Sejm rejected the ambassadors' demand. The Orthodox only obtained confirmation of the right to use temples that were in their possession, renovate churches erected before 1717, not to pay for their sacraments with Uniate parish priests, to apply to clergymen for a presentation without the need for additional fees, and to litigate over church property. However, the ban on building new temples was maintained.

===== Participation in the Słuck Confederation and the Repnin Sejm =====
Jerzy (Konissky) was one of the founders of the dissident Słuck Confederation, supported by Russia with arms, and as its consigliere signed its act on March 20, 1767. Being a representative of the dissident side, he took part in negotiations with a delegation of the so-called Repnin Sejm to prepare a Polish-Russian convention on dissidents. During the Russian-controlled sessions of the Sejm, he participated in the work of the committee drafting resolutions on the rights of dissidents, whose chairman was the Russian ambassador. In 1767, he published in Warsaw the Prawa i wolności dyssydentów w nabożeństwie chrześcijańskim w Koronie Polskiej i Wielkim Xięstwie Litewskim. Under Russian pressure, the Sejm made the following decisions with regard to the Orthodox: it confirmed rights to the Belarusian bishopric, returned all religious buildings taken away after 1717, admitted the Orthodox to state positions and offices, established mixed (Catholic-Orthodox-Protestant) courts to finally settle questions of the belonging of disputed religious buildings, and forbade the insulting titling of the Orthodox as dissenters or dyssunites. At the same time, the parliamentary constitution preserved the status of Catholicism as the ruling religion in the state, the abandonment of which was punishable. These solutions did not fully satisfy the Belarusian bishop, who demanded the right to freely convert from Catholicism to Orthodoxy. Contrary to his expectations, the hierarch also failed to obtain a seat in the Senate, and Russia did not support his efforts in this direction, probably so that George (Konissky) would not in time become a loyal and active citizen of the Republic. The bishop's requests to continue pressuring the Polish authorities so that the possibility of conversion to Orthodoxy would be legalized were also rejected – the consistory of the eparchies of Mstsislaw, Mogilev and Orsha had received a huge number of requests to allow such conversion from the Uniates of Right Bank Ukraine.

===== Facing the Bar Confederation =====
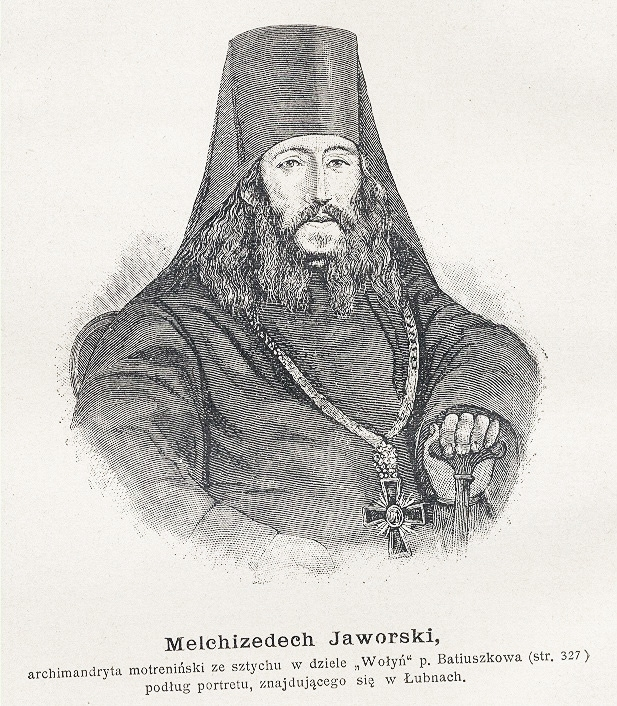
Ihumen Melchizedek (Znaczko-Yavorsky) was a close associate of Bishop George, and after the formation of the Bar Confederation, together with him he called on the Orthodox population of Transdnieprian Ukraine to fight militarily in defense of their religion. Thus, he significantly contributed to the outbreak of Koliivshchyna

After the formation of the Bar Confederation, which acted in defense of the independence of the Republic and the Catholic faith, and therefore also against the rights of dissidents, the Orthodox clergy took part in an agitational action aimed at persuading Orthodox peasants and haidamakas to rise up against the nobility. Bishop George and his close associate, the superior of the Motronynskyi Monastery, hegumen Melkhisedek, took a significant part in these activities. The result of these actions was the outbreak of a bloody peasant uprising – the Koliivshchyna. Both clergymen later denied their involvement in inspiring the revolt, but the Russian envoy in Warsaw did not find their explanations credible.

George (Konissky) saw the formation of the Bar Confederation as a direct threat to his person, and in April 1768 he left Warsaw for Mogilev and then Smolensk, entrusting the supervision of his eparchy to Victor Sadkowski, rector of the Mogilev seminary. From Smolensk, the hierarch sent pastoral letters to Mogilev. Together with Smolensk Bishop Parthenius Sopkowski, he also compiled a work describing the duties and tasks of the clergy entitled O dołżnostiach prieswitierov prichodskich.

==== After the First Partition of Poland ====
George (Konissky) welcomed the First Partition of Poland, comparing the situation of the Orthodox after this event to that of Jews leaving Egyptian captivity. In 1772, by virtue of the First Partition of Poland, the area of the Belarusian eparchy became part of the Russian Empire. The Most Holy Synod incorporated part of its former lands with Vitebsk, Daugavpils and Polotsk into the Pskov eparchy. Also, the name Belarusian eparchy ceased to be used, henceforth only the names Mogilev, Mstsislaw and Orsha eparchy were used. George (Konissky) remained its Ordinary. The post-partition Polish-Russian treaty preserved the freedom of worship of Catholics of both rites in the lands incorporated into Russia. Taking advantage of this arrangement, some Uniate parishes converted to the Latin rite. Others adopted Orthodoxy. Initially, however, the Russian authorities did not accept Bishop George's plans to carry out a complete liquidation of the Uniate faith on the territory of the Orthodox eparchy of Mogilev. In 1773, Catherine II obliged the bishop to issue a pastoral letter negatively addressing group conversions of Uniates. The letter, however, allowed individual declarations of willingness to change their religion, which those interested would submit to the appropriate officials or Orthodox landowners. It was not until seven years later that the Bishop of Mogilev was granted the right to incorporate vacant Unitarian parishes into the Orthodox Church, subject to the faithful's consent to change their religion. He judicially threatened all those who would not obey these recommendations, causing the number of the Orthodox in the territory under his authority to increase by 112,578 between 1781 and 1783. On several occasions, the bishop addressed pastoral letters to the clergy with instructions on matters of administering the sacraments. Within the eparchy, he initiated further investments in church architecture, and in 1780 began construction of St. Joseph's Cathedral in Mogilev. He also opened charitable institutions and hospitals in his eparchy, and inspired the custom of distributing alms to the poor and sick in Orthodox churches every Saturday.

In 1783 George (Konissky) received the title of archbishop and became a member of the Most Holy Synod. From then on, he was not only the executor but also the co-author of Russian policy toward the Orthodox in the Republic. In 1784, he suggested to Metropolitanate of Kiev, Samuel, that he ordain an auxiliary bishop who would be responsible for the Orthodox parishes and monasteries in the country. He identified his former secretary and collaborator, Viktor (Sadkovsky), as a suitable candidate for this dignity. Bishop Viktor's chirotony took place the following year. Archbishop George remained in constant contact with him and gave him advice on matters of day-to-day pastoral activity. He carried out propaganda and diplomatic activities for the complete liquidation of the Uniate Church and the joining of its adherents to the Russian Orthodox Church. He issued a memorial outlining such a concept in 1786; in it he also called for the Orthodox to accept Russian patronage. This text was a response to an anonymous memorandum, which in turn appealed to the Uniates to adopt the Latin rite. George (Konissky) was interested in the position of the Orthodox in the Republic until his death. The indictment deputation of the Four-Year Sejm investigating the accused rebels considered him the author of "all projects useful to Moscow and disastrous for Poland."

He amassed a rich library of 1,269 books and 241 manuscripts.

He died in 1795 and was buried in the Transfiguration Cathedral in Mogilev. A rhymed epitaph was placed on the hierarch's grave, which was composed by George (Konissky) himself. (Note: The exact content of the epitaph in Russian: Колыбель Нежин, Киев мой учитель, Я в тридцать восемь лет сделался святитель. Семнадцать лет боролся я с волками. А двадцать два, как пастырь, отдохнул с овцами. За претерпенные труды и непогоду Архиепископом и Членом стал Синоду, Георгий именем, я из Конисских дому, Коню подобен бывал почтовому. Сего тут падла* (падаль) закрыл грешны кости Год седьмисотый пятый девяностый. (Георгий Конисский)) His grave in the chapel of St. Barbara of the same church was opened at the time of the French invasion of Russia in 1812 and again during the renovation of the cathedral in 1875. According to the Russian Orthodox Church, it was found at that time that the body of the hierarch was not decomposed. The burial site was destroyed along with the entire Transfiguration Cathedral.

== Scientific and literary achievements ==
George (Konissky) wrote in Russian, Latin and Polish. He was the author of the first systematic textbook of theology in the Russian Orthodox Church – a treatise Cristiana orthodoxa Theologia, written in Latin for the Mogilev Academy. In this work, the author first articulated the differences between theology and philosophy, and between dogmatic and moral theology. As a theologian, he initially paid homage to scholasticism, then gradually began to lean towards the theology of Theophanes (Prokopovich) inspired by Protestantism.

He also published textbooks of philosophy Philosophia peripathetica (1747) and Philosophia juxta numerum quatuor facultatum quadripartita (1749); they included the content of his lectures delivered at the Mogilev Academy. His philosophical views and the division of philosophy into logic, physics, metaphysics and ethics applied in his publications had a significant impact on the further development of Russian philosophy. He formulated a concept of cognition assuming three stages of the process: sensory cognition, intellectual formation of a concept and its evaluation. He polemicized with Voltaire's views. After 1774, the clergyman also wrote the historical Istoricheskoye izvestiye o yeparchii Mogilevskoy, a work that synthetically presents the history of Orthodox administrations in the Belarusian and Ukrainian lands. In this text, George (Konissky) called for the unification of all the Orthodox inhabitants of Ukraine, Belarus and Russia in the Russian Empire.

As a lecturer in poetics, he published in 1746 its textbook entitled Precepta de arte poetica. In it he urged his students to refer to traditional Russian literature, rather than to Western (Polish and Latin) models. He himself wrote dramatic works and poems, and was the author of translations of psalms into Polish and Russian. Also dating from 1746 is his satirical comedy Voskriesieniye miertwych with five intermedia. This work was an exemplary realization of school poetics, but it also contained clear inspirations from folk humor, with folk vocabulary evident in its language.

A separate place in the achievements of George (Konissky) is occupied by his political speeches and sermons preached in Orthodox churches. Some of the homilies were published while the author was still alive in 1761, but this edition did not survive. The hierarch was considered an excellent and charismatic preacher. At the same time, some historians of Russian homiletics accused him of shallowness of thought, unjustified formulation of analogies between events in biblical history and his contemporary situations, and weaving vulgar jokes and word games into his sermons.

The author of a diary entitled Myśli, in which he included a number of his philosophical views.

== Commemoration ==
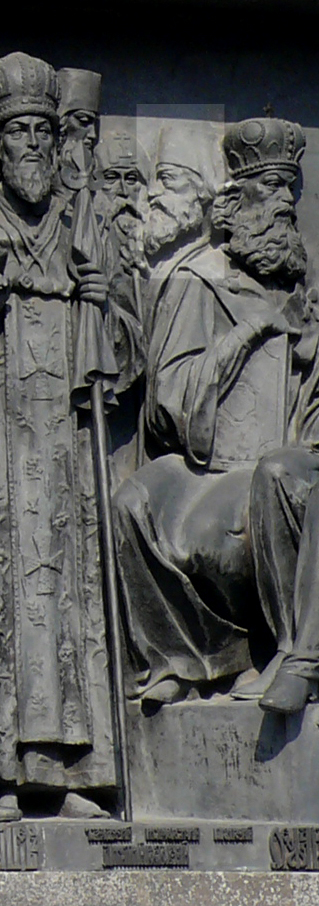
Fragment of the Millenium of Russia with the figure of George (Konissky).

In 1835, the bishop's collected works – literary texts, sermons, reports, polemical works – were published in St. Petersburg. The figure of Bishop George can be found on the Millenium of Russia in Veliky Novgorod. His activity is also commemorated by a plaque placed on the bishop's residence in Mogilev.

=== Veneration ===
The informal veneration of George (Konissky) appeared almost immediately after his death, but the canonization of the cleric did not occur until 1993. In August of that year, the Belarusian Orthodox Church recognized him as a locally venerated saint in the Mogilev and Mstsislaw eparchies, thanks to the special efforts of its Ordinary, Bishop Maxim. The canonization ceremony was presided over by the exarch of Belarus, Metropolitanate of Minsk and Slutsk, Philaret. The hierarch belongs to the Council of Belarusian Saints and is liturgically remembered along with other saints belonging to it on the Third Sunday after Pentecost. Two years after his canonization, an Akathist to St. George was written. Orthodox churches of his invocation are located in Mogilev and Slutsk.

In 2011, the veneration of Bishop George was also sanctioned in the Ukrainian Orthodox Church of the Moscow Patriarchate. At that time, the anniversary of his death and the anniversary of the decision to extend veneration to Ukraine were set as dates of liturgical remembrance. In 2014, veneration of the bishop was introduced in the non-canonical Ukrainian Orthodox Church of the Kyiv Patriarchate, within its Chernihiv eparchy. In the Kyiv Patriarchate, the liturgical memory of George falls on 13/26 February and 24 July/6 August.

The image of the clergyman on the icons is modeled on his portrait created during his lifetime and kept first in the Lutheran Church in Mogilev, then in the Orthodox Church of Saints Boris and Gleb in Mogilev, and since 1960 in the local national history museum. George (Konissky) is shown with the Gospel in his left hand and with his right hand raised in a gesture of blessing. Depending on the variant, he is dressed in episcopal liturgical or extra-liturgical garb (riasa, bishop's mantia and black klobuk).
