= Haidamaky (poem) =

1841 epic poem by Taras Shevchenko

- 1841 publication cover, "Hajdamaky"
- Author: Taras Shevchenko
- Original title: Гайдамаки
- Language: Ukrainian
- Genre: Epic poem
- Published: 1841
- Publisher: A.Sychyov typography
- Publication place: Russian Empire

Haidamaky (Ukrainian: «Гайдамаки», lit. 'haydamaks'), also transliterated Hajdamaky, Haydamaki, or as Haydamaks is an epic poem by Taras Shevchenko about the Koliivshchyna uprising led by Maksym Zalizniak and Ivan Gonta.

== History of creation ==
The poem was written in about 1839–1841 and first published in full as a separate book in Saint Petersburg in 1841. It is dedicated to the author's friend, artist, Vasyl Ivanovych Hryhorovych. It is included in later editions of the classic collection of poetry, Kobzar. It is possible that Shevchenko was inspired to create the poem as an answer to contemporary Polish publications dedicated to the Koliivshchyna, such as Zamek Kaniowski ("Kaniv Castle") by Seweryn Goszczyński and Wernyhora by Michał Czajkowski.

== Structure ==
The poem consists of an introduction, 11 main chapters, an "Epilogue," a prose preface, and "Precepts." The introduction and the "Epilogue" are the compositional framing of the poem. In the introduction, the poet declares his ideological intention to glorify the Haidamaks. Here he asserts the idea of the nationality of literature and the right of Ukrainian literature to exist and develop.

== Plot ==
The story has two intertwined storylines: the development and course of the uprising called Koliivshchyna and the story of Yarema's personal life.

The quotes are taken from the English translation of the poem by John Weir.

=== Foreword ===
The foreword of the poem concerns itself with the unstoppable flow of time (All flows and all passes — this goes on forever...) and expresses the author's wish to prevent oblivion by sharing his poetic words with the reader (The soul is alive. Its ordeal may be softened / If someone will read these word-teardrops of mine...). The author follows with a satirical depiction of some contemporaries who might dislike the poem and laments the general indifference of the public to Ukrainian history (Of Cossacks, hetmans there's no trace — / Their graves alone survive, / And now they're even digging up / The mounds wherein they lie.).

Contrary to them, the author expresses his resolve to celebrate the history of his country and his belief, that this action alone is enough to revive heroes of the past, at least in the listeners' imagination (I sing — and from the grave mounds step / The Cossacks with their steeds, / And soon they throng the boundless steppes / As far as eye can see; / Atamans on their raven mounts / With maces lifted high / Before the Cossack columns prance...). He euphemistically depicts the protagonists of his poem as his own children (My sons, my Haidamaki brave! / The world is free and wide! / Go forth, my sons, and make your way — / Perhaps you'll fortune find.) and expresses hope, that the text will find a positive reception among readers and take its place in the folk culture of the Ukrainian people.

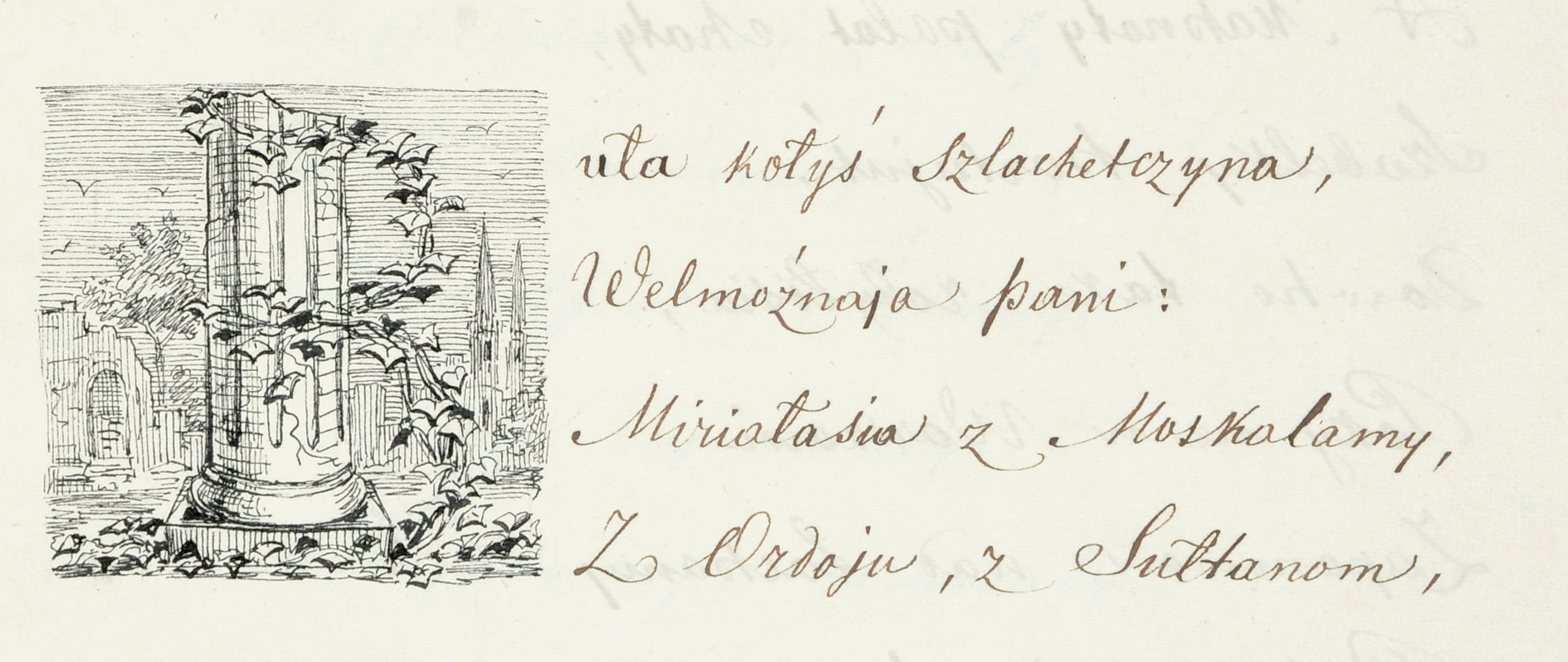
Shevchenko's autograph of the introduction, written in Polish orthography and with an initial

=== Introduction ===
The introduction to the story presents a historical panorama of the Polish nobility in the decades preceding the events described in the poem. The increasing power of nobles, especially the liberum veto, as well as the weakness of Polish kings is shown as the cause of Poland's eventual downfall. The creation of Bar Confederation is seen by the author as a symptom of this decline, with its participants proclaiming high ideals of freedom, but instead engaging in simple robbery and plunder of the population in Poland, Lithuania, Ukraine and Moldavia. The author also accuses the Confederates of conspiring with Jews in order to exploit their subjects (They scattered wide and they forgot / That freedom was their aim — / They joined with Jews in compact foul / To rob and devastate.).

=== Halaida ===
The chapter presents the poem's main protagonist Yarema, a poor Cossack orphan who is forced to earn his living by doing chores for a local Jew called Leiba.

=== Confederates ===
After Yarema is ordered by Leiba to depart for Vilshana, the Jew's house is visited by a band of nobles supporting the Bar Confederation. The Poles force their host to make the sign of the cross and demand that he serves them alcohol. As the nobles get drunk, they start singing Poland Is Not Yet Lost and force Leiba to dance in order to entertain them, and then demand that he pays them for their attention. After Leiba lies that he has no money, the Poles start beating him. Under torture, the Jew claims that the church of Vilshana has a lot of money in its treasury, and the band sets out for journey, taking Leiba as their guide.

=== The Churchwarden ===
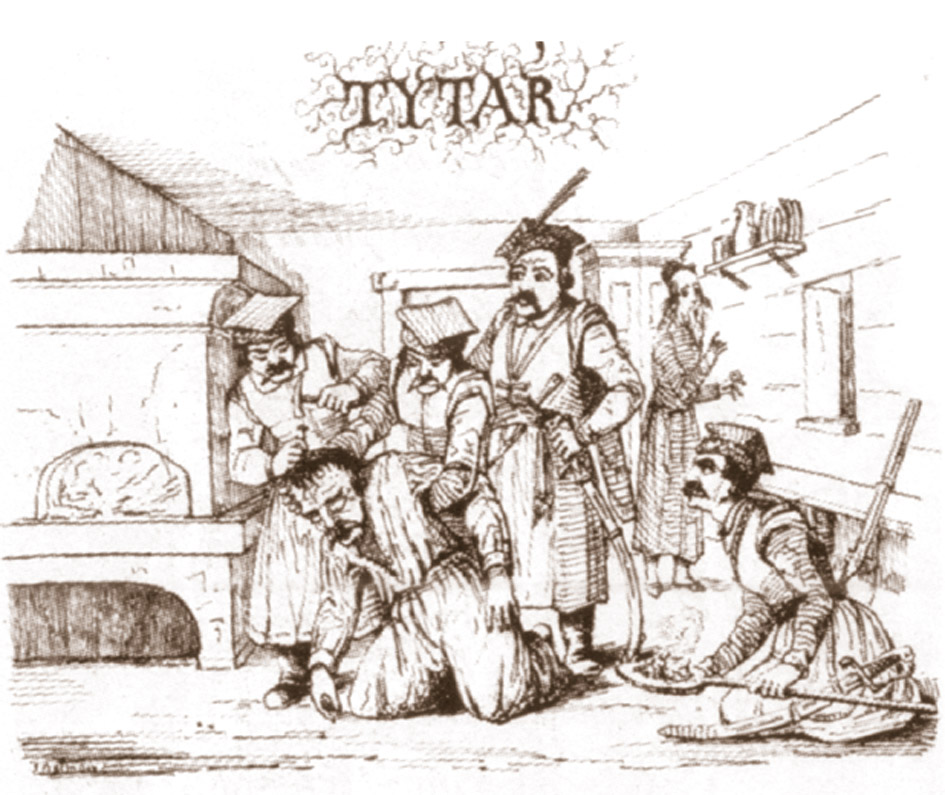
Confederates torturing the churchwarden, illustration by Shevchenko's close friend Y. De Balmen

In Vilshana Yarema secretly meets his beloved Oksana, the daughter of a local churchwarden. Yarema tells Oksana about his plan to join the Cossack rebels in Chyhyryn in order to become rich and famous, so that her parents could allow him to marry her (I’ll dress you rich from head to toe / Like bird of paradise, / And seat you on a tripod stool / Just like a Hetman’s wife). Oksana initially doubts Yarema's sincerity ("Ah, but perhaps you will forget? / When rich, in Kiev-town / Yourself a high-born bride you’ll get, / Oksana you’ll disown!...") and they spend the whole night arguing, but eventually pledge their mutual love once again. Yarema also confides to Oksana the Haidamaks' plan to slay all Poles (i.e. nobles) in Ukraine and leaves soon thereafter to join the oncoming revolt.

In the next scene a band of Confederates enters the house of Oksana's father and demands that he give them his gold in exchange for his life being spared. The churchwarden refuses to deliver them to the location where the treasure is kept, so the Poles torture him to death. Attracted by the noise, Oksana returns home and faints upon discovering her father's dead body. The gang flees, with their leader taking the unconscious Oksana hostage.

=== Feast in Chyhyryn ===
Cossacks and Haidamaks gather in Chyhyryn and make a decision to rise up against the Catholic nobles and their plans to subjugate Ukraine. Their pledge to protect the Orthodox faith is accompanied with the blessing of their knives by a deacon.

=== The Third Cock's Crow ===
In the beginning of the chapter the author demonstrates a picture of devastation brought upon Ukraine and its Orthodox population by the rebellious Confederate nobles and their supposed Jewish allies (The Pole and Jew at feasts / With blood their liquor drained, / Complained the plunder was too poor, / Schismatics they condemned.). Meanwhile, Yarema reaches the Dnieper near Cherkasy. Enjoying the view of the river, he recalls the glorious Cossack past and pledges to destroy the gentry and to restore Hetman's rule over Ukraine.

=== The Red Banquet ===
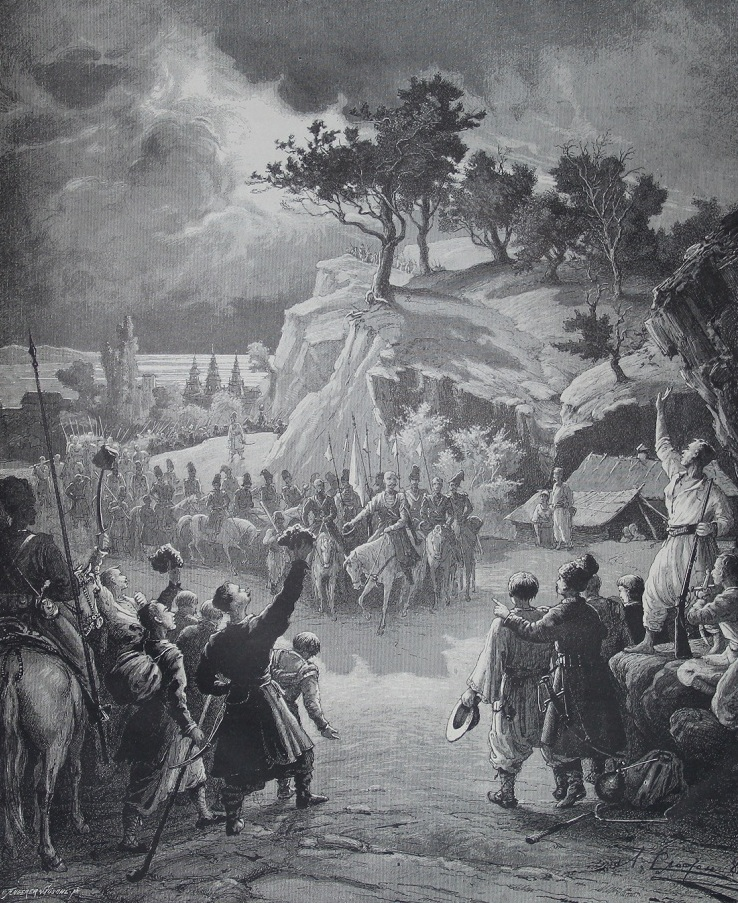
Haidamaky on the march - an illustration to the poem by Opanas Slastion, 1886

Soon afterwards, a general uprising of Haidamaks begins around Ukraine (Throughout Ukraine the clang of bells / Proclaims the day of doom; / The Haidamaki fiercely, yell: / "The gentry's end has come! / The gentry's finished! We shall set / A fire to sear the sky!"), starting with Medvedivka and spreading to the towns of Smila, Korsun, Kaniv, Cherkasy and Chyhyryn, reaching as far as Volyn and Polissia. Yarema joins the rebels in Cherkasy and takes part in a massacre in the city's market square. After the Haidamaks' victory he is presented to Cossack leader Maksym Zalizniak, who, upon hearing that he comes from Vilshana, tells him about the kidnapping of Oksana. Shocked by the news, Yarema faints, and upon regaining consciousness becomes even more resolute in his pledge to exterminate the Polish nobles. He officially joins the Cossack troops and is put into their registry under the name Halaida. After burning down Cherkasy, Zalizniak's troops move along the Dnieper, with Yarema musing about the fate of his beloved Oksana in Polish captivity.

=== Hupalivshchyna ===
The rebellion continues to spread, with many localities in Ukraine devastated, and the surviving nobles in hiding (The rising sun found all Ukraine / In ashes or in flames, / Just here and there behind locked doors / The gentry trembling waits. / Each village has its gallows-trees / With corpses thickly hung — / Just of the bigwigs, smaller fry / Are piled in heaps like dung.). In many villages even the women and children have joined the rebels. Reflecting upon the killings, the author proclaims the mutual slaughter of humans to be senseless and blames the conflict on Jesuit priests (The heart is sore when you reflect / That sons of Slavs like beasts / Got drunk with blood. Who was to blame? / The Jesuits, the priests!).

Upon passing through Vilshana together with other rebels, Yarema gets a confirmation from locals, that Oksana had been kidnapped. He also learns about the disappearance of Leiba, the local Jewish tavernkeeper who had been his employer. Near the village the rebels surround a gang of Polish nobles attempting to hide in a forest. After capturing them, the Haidamaks take their gold and lead the prisoners to Lysianka.

=== Banquet in Lysianka ===
As the Haidamaks massacre the Poles in Lysianka, Yarema meets Leiba, who poses as one of the rebels, and learns from him, that Oksana is being held by her kidnappers in one of the houses on the outskirts of the town. He attempts to persuade Zalizniak not to attack the building, but to no avail. As rebels set the house on fire, Yarema and Leiba sneak inside and manage to save Oksana.

=== Lebedyn ===
Yarema brings Oksana to a monastery in Lebedyn, where she recuperates and learns that Halaida, her rescuer, is in fact her beloved Yarema. A week later Yarema and Oksana get married. Soon thereafter, at Zalizniak's demand, the couple parts as Yarema sets out for Uman.

=== Gonta in Uman ===
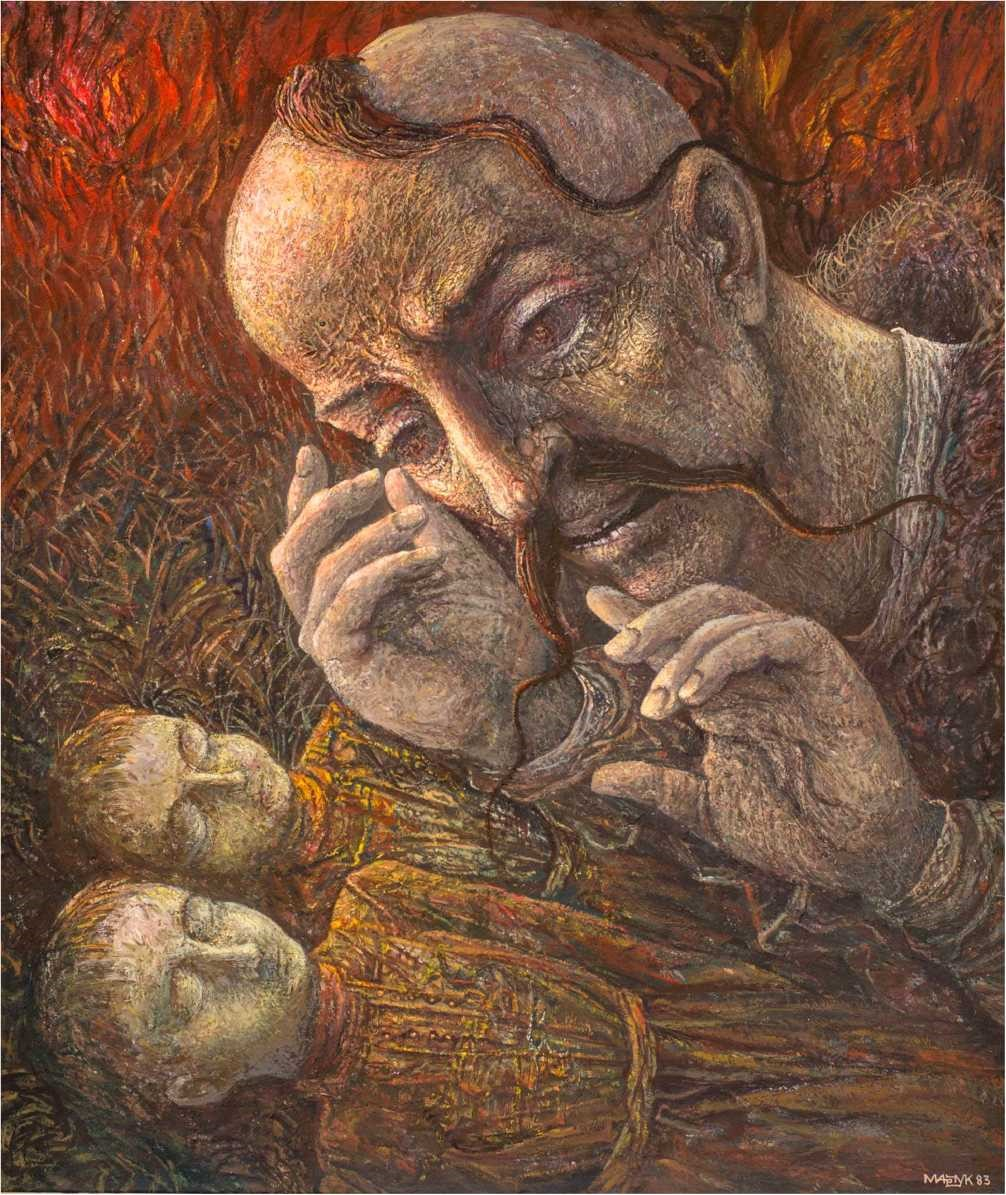
Gonta burying his sons, illustration by Ivan Marchuk

The rebellion continues throughout the autumn, winter, and into the spring. Yarema fights against the Poles together with Zalizniak's forces, bringing devastation to the area between Uman and Kyiv. The Haidamaks manage to infiltrate Uman during the night and meet fellow rebels headed by Ivan Gonta in the city's market square. During the fights the insurgents capture two of Gonta's young sons, who had been raised as Catholics by their mother. In order to confirm his pledge to fight against the enemies of Orthodox faith, Gonta is forced by the crowd to slay his children. By the end of the day all Poles in the city are killed and Uman is burnt down. As Haidamaks feast on the city's ruins, Gonta secretly buries his sons and repents for his crime ("Please pray to God. I beg of you, / That he should punish me / Yet on this earth for what I did, / For this most awful crime. / Forgive me, sons! You I forgive / That Catholics you died."). Promising to meet his children soon, he rejoins the Haidamaks.

=== Epilogue ===
In the epilogue the author shares own childhood memories about his grandfather telling him the story of the Haidamaks, and thanks him for preserving this knowledge for the future generations. He then proceeds to describe the fate of the rebel leaders: Gonta, who was buried in an unmarked grave with no one to mourn his death, and Zalizniak, who was exiled and died in faraway lands. Yarema, who visits Zalizniak's grave, mourns over the fate of Ukraine, but promises to remember his deeds ("Rest, father, in this foreign place, / For in our native land / No longer is there any space, / Nor freedom to be had.... / Sleep soundly, honest Cossack soul! / You won't forgotten be."). The author himself mourns the defeat of the rebels, which was followed by the destruction of the Sich and migration of the Cossacks to the Danube and Kuban. Ukraine has been subdued (And the Ukraine is fast asleep, / Asleep for evermore.), but the memory of the Haidamaks lives on among its common folk (But sometime, when the day is done, / And all is warm with spring, / Old Haidamaki walk along / The Dnieper's banks and sing...).

== Political meaning ==
Haidamaky was the first major work dedicated to Polish-Ukrainian relations since the publication of the History of Ruthenians in the late 18th century. Despite presenting a picture of strong antagonism and struggle between its Ukrainian and Polish heroes, the poem doesn't show conflict as the only essence of relations between both peoples. On the contrary, in his afterword to the poem Shevchenko expressed his hope for a better future for both Ukrainians and Poles, based on Slavophile ideals of the time.

== Reception ==
From Taras Shevchenko

The poem was met with sharp criticism by the literary critic Vissarion Belinsky; in the magazine Otechestvennye Zapiski he criticized Shevchenko's "inclination to romantic pompous ingenuity".

The first Polish translation of Haidamaky saw the light in 1861, the year of Shevchenko's death, and was published by Leopold Sowiński as addition to his treatise on Shevchenko's poetry. The text caused a great controversy among the Polish public, and Sowiński was even forced to excuse himself for its publication. Nevertheless, part of the Polish readers considered Shevchenko's perspective to be important, demonstrating a strong polarization of opinions in Polish society.

== Legacy ==
Unlike many other works by Shevchenko, the uncensored version of Haidamaky was actively published in the Russian Empire starting from 1860s, as its depiction of massacres against the non-Orthodox population found support among Russian monarchists in the aftermath of the Polish Uprising of 1863. The poem became especially popular in the late 19th-early 20th century, when the image of haidamaks attained a symbolic meaning for the Ukrainian national movement. Several units of the Ukrainian People's Army adopted the name of haidamaks in 1918-1920.

== Cultural references ==
- The band Haidamaky takes their name from the poem, and released an album entitled Kobzar.

== See also ==
- Haydamaks
- Kobzar
- Taras Shevchenko
- Izbornyk
- List of Ukrainian-language poets
- List of Ukrainian-language writers
- Ukrainian literature

== Sources ==
- Тарас Шевченко. Зібрання творів: У 6 т. — К., 2003. — Т. 1: Поезія 1837–1847. — С. 128–190. (Original text)
