= Maksym Zalizniak =

Ukrainian Cossack and leader of the Koliivshchyna rebellion

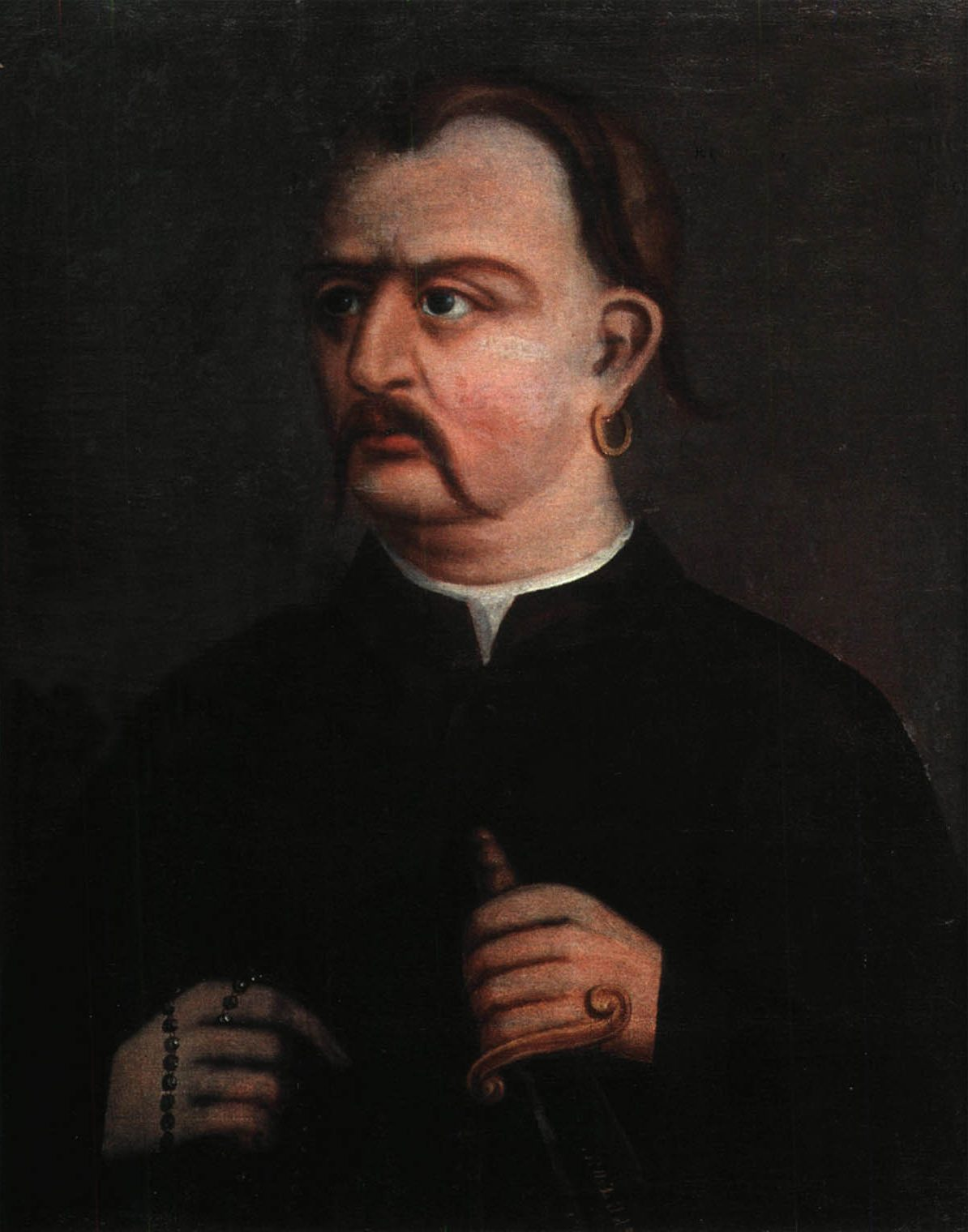
Maksym Zalizniak

Maksym Zalizniak (Old Ukrainian: Максимъ (Маѯимъ, Маѯымъ) Желѣзнякъ, Жалѣзнякъ, modern Ukrainian: Максим Залізняк; contemporary Polish: Maxym Zelizniak ), (born early 1740s in Ivkivtsi, modern-day Cherkasy Oblast - date and place of death unknown, after 1768) was a Ukrainian Cossack and leader of the Koliivshchyna rebellion.

== Biography ==
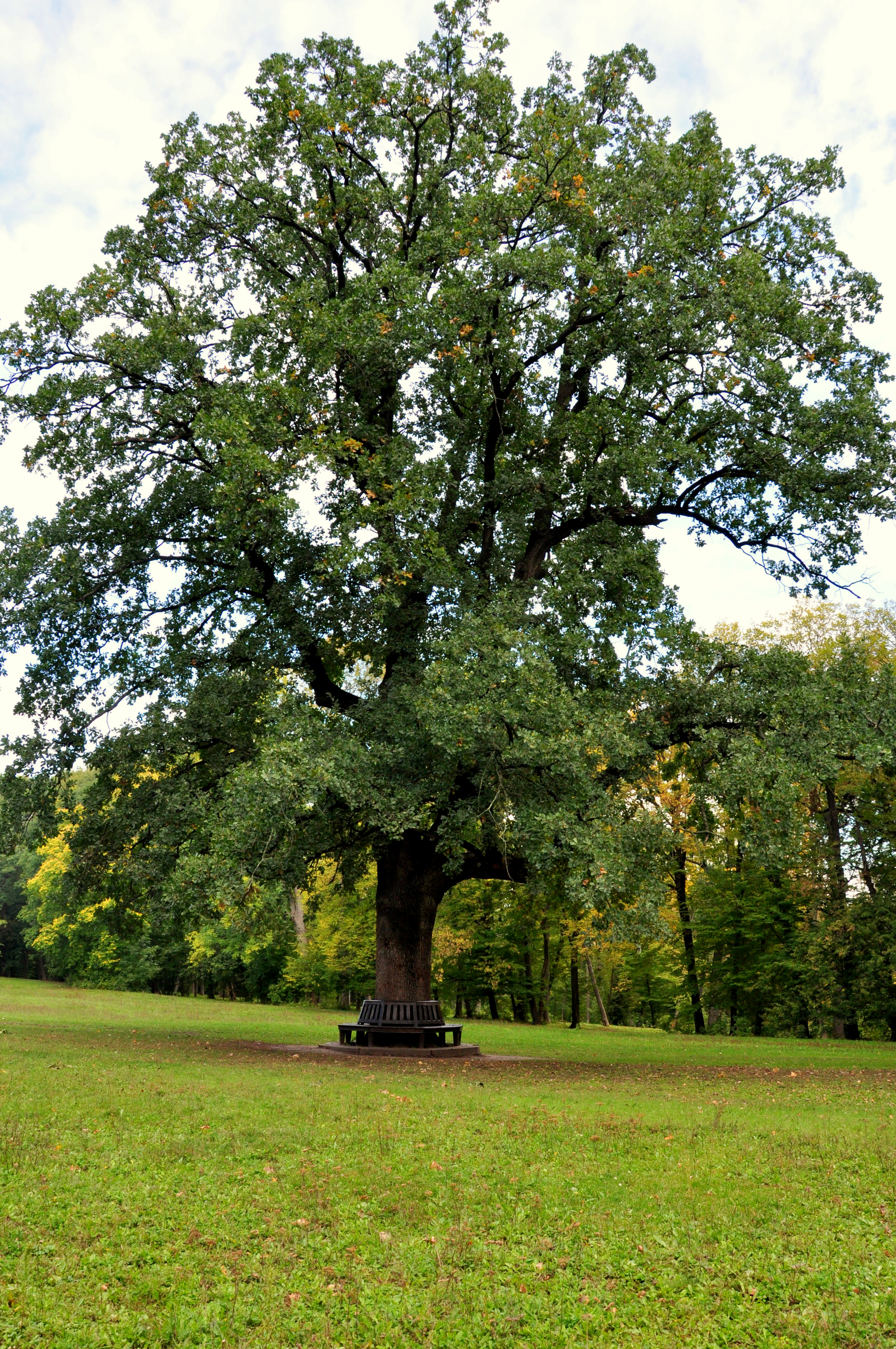
Oak of Zalizniak in Uman, Ukraine

Monument of Zalizniak in Medvedivka, Ukraine

Zalizniak was born in a poor peasant family of Orthodox Christians in the Crown land in Polish Right-bank Ukraine about 1740. At a very young age he joined the Zaporozhian Host and in 1753 became an agricultural employee, and later a fisherman.

By 1767 Zalizniak had retired both from the Sich and from his canteen trade and became a lay brother at Motronynskyi Monastery near Chyhyryn. He learnt that there was a lot of Russian money (false Dutch ducats) deposited in the monastery and in many parts of Ukraine in order to fund an uprising against the Bar confederation. Witnessing the confederates' oppression of peasants in Right-bank Ukraine, Zalizniak decided to divide the ducats among rank-and-file Ukrainians, left the monastery and started an uprising of over 1,000 Cossacks and others groups throughout the region.

Zalizniak called himself a colonel of Zaporozhian Sich although the people often called him an otaman. In fact he had been an employee of Zaporozhian Cossacks and then the owner of a canteen in Turkish Ochakiv. This was very dangerous for him, because he could have been sent to Turkey by the Russian army after his imprisonment in order to investigate his canteen activities. But as reported to Russian prosecutors by the otaman of his regiment Vasyl Korzh in July 1768, apart from his service as an employee Maksym had military training in artillery and serves as a subcannoneer of Tymashivsky kurin (regiment) of the Sich until 1762, which meant in July 1768 he was a Russian subject. The otaman knew nothing about the activities of Zalizniak's canteen in Ochakov and about his decision to become a monk, and had no connection to him for many years.

The main reasons for the uprising were the brutal enforcement of new religious and social-economic laws implemented by the Polish nobility (szlachta) during the Bar Confederation revolt, whose participants had a negative attitude regarding Orthodox Christianity and even Eastern Catholics. Bar confederation members used to hang a Uniate clergyman, a Jew and a dog on a single tree to emphasize that the Uniate faith and Orthodox one were the same with the faith of dogs and Jews. Zalizniak's followers would hang Roman Catholic clergymen and noblemen together with Jews and dogs in the same way as retaliation.

There was a report of a "Golden Bull" issued by the Russian Empress Catherine II in support of armed insurrection against the Bar Confederation and its supporters, which in opinion of Zalizniak included all Old Believers, Armenians, Greeks, Muslims and other minorities (most probably with exception of Romanians, who were among active participants of the haidamaka movement), as well as many Roman Catholic Poles, Jews and even some Ukrainian Uniate clergymen, who did not want to convert to Orthodoxy. He swore that he had never planned any massacres of Poles and Jews but wanted to insist on their conversion into Orthodox Christianity, contrary to other minorities, who were to be cleansed together with children and women irrespective of their religion. The call to armed insurrection against the Bar Confederation could have been inspired by father Melkhysedek Znachko-Yavorsky, the abbot of the Motronynskyi Monastery where Zalizniak had become a dutiful novice. However, Melkhysedek had been absent in Ukraine since 1766 and never met Zalizniak who came to the monastery in that year.

Thousands of people throughout Ukraine responded to Zalizniak’s call for uprising. In April 1768 Zalizniak emerged from Motronynskyi Forest and started to advance toward Uman. Uman and Lysianka became the places of the most violent conflict during Koliivshchyna. At Uman Zalizniak joined forces with Ivan Gonta, who was initially ordered by Bar confederation to attack the rebels. Gonta and his men were the only household Cossacks joining Koliivshchyna. Other household Cossacks remained loyal to either the Polish Crown or Bar Confederation. After Uman fell, Zalizniak declared the reinstatement of the Hetman State in Right-bank Ukraine and proclaimed himself the new right-bank Hetman. The Koliivshchyna movement overwhelmed the Poles, and they appealed to Russia for help. Fearing that the rebellion would ignite a war with Turkey, Catherine crushed the rebels (known as haidamaks). Zalizniak and Gonta were captured by Russian colonel Guriev.

As a subject of Russian Empire, Zalizniak was kept under arrest by the Russians, unlike Ivan Gonta, who was turned over to the Poles for trial and executed. On July 8, 1768 Zalizniak and 73 rebels were imprisoned in Kyiv-Pechersk Fortress . At the end of the month the case was ordered for trial by Kyiv Provincial Court. As Zalizniak operated during peacetime in the Russian Empire, he and his cohorts were spared the death sentence, following the order of Elizabeth I to spare death sentences in peacetime (unlike Pugachev, whose troops, including some former participants of Koliivshchyna, operated during martial law). The condemned were severely whipped and branded in the presence of the representatives of the Turkish government on the border with Turkey. There were no deaths, though many Russians would die after such whippings. By November 1, 1768 Zalizniak was deported to Bilhorod. In the vicinity of Okhtyrka he and 51 of his comrades were able to escape by disarming the guards. Most of the fugitives, including Zalizniak, however were quickly captured. Finally the captives were sentenced to exile to Far East or Siberia instead of life imprisonment and sentenced to hard labor. This was caused by the war with Turkey, after the beginning of which it became clear that the Ottoman empire would have declared a war on Russia even without the raids of Zalizniak's detachments on Balta, Golta and Dubăsari. Zalizniak's further whereabouts are unknown, though rumors existed that he and many exiled members, both from his force and from Bar Confederation, later joined Pugachev. Catherine II became the beneficiary of Zalizniak's activities, because after the uprising many Poles and especially Jews and other minorities in the Commonwealth of Poland and Lithuania began to support Russia. In Poland Kajetan Soltyk, the main instigator of the Bar Confederation, was later recognized insane for provoking Zalizniak's rebellion.

== Legacy ==
In traditional culture of the Ukrainian people, Zalizniak lives on as a controversial folk hero known for his struggle to protect Ukrainian identity and Orthodox Christian faith, notwithstanding the fact that he called for all Orthodox Christian Greeks residing in Ukraine, including women and children, to be exterminated. A lot of Orthodox Christian Ukrainians were killed by his people as well. Zalizniak had never insisted on the murder Jews and Poles only, and his ethnic cleansing was targeted against almost all other minorities in Ukraine. He explained that women and children, being the vast majority of his army, massacred Jews and Poles without any of his orders. Many Jewish and Polish children were assimilated with Ukrainians after his uprising, meanwhile Old Believers, Greeks, Armenians, Moslems and others were exterminated. Zalizniak's idealized image is a subject of numerous folk songs, legends and lore.

== In popular culture ==
- Taras Shevchenko's epic poem Haidamaky is dedicated to haidamaks, including Zalizniak.

== Sources ==
- Great Soviet Encyclopedia
