= Haydamak =

18th-century Ukrainian paramilitary outfits made up of commoners

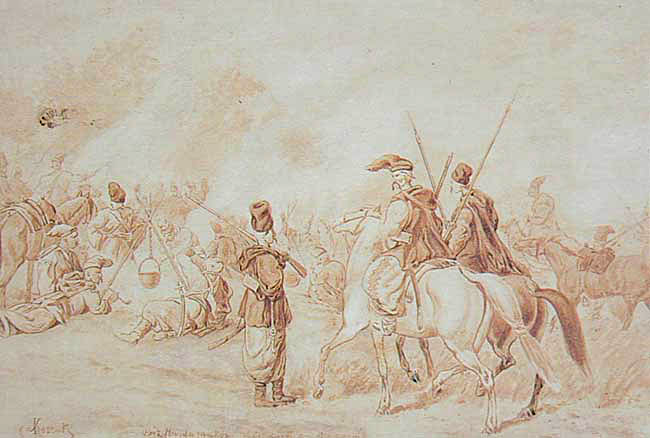
Camp of Haidamakas (1899) by Juliusz Kossak

The haydamaks, also haidamakas or haidamaky or haidamaks (sing. haidamaka; pl. haidamaky, from Ukrainian: гайдамаки and Polish: hajdamacy) were Ukrainian Cossack paramilitaries, who were active in the eastern part of the Polish–Lithuanian Commonwealth. The haidamak movement emerged in Right-bank Ukraine after the ratification of the Treaty of Perpetual Peace with the Tsardom of Russia in 1710 as a result of growing ethnic, social and religious tensions, complicated by general anarchy and economic decline of the region. Haidamaks adopted guerrilla tactics and swiftly increased their numbers through the influx of commoners such as peasants and craftsmen, monks and petty noblemen, as well as simple criminals. Supported by the Orthodox clergy, the actions of haidamaks attained a strong religious component.

== Etymology and terminology ==
=== Etymology ===
The word haydamak has two related meanings: either 'Ukrainian insurgent against the Poles in the 18th century', or 'brigand'. The role played by haydamaks in the anti-Polish Ukrainian revolts of the 18th-century led by Maksym Zalizniak and Ivan Gonta led to the first meaning.

The word has been adopted into Ukrainian from the Crimea and the neighbouring region, where it has been used in some Kipchak, Oghuz and Slavic languages. The origin is the Turkic word 'haydamak', 'to drive, to drive away', the etymological vehicle being the Ottoman Turkish. The verb (h)ayda was probably derived from the onomatopoeic stem used to spur someone on: 'hayda!'. Depending on the local context, it was understood to mean 'driving someone or something away', and later 'to chase, to pursue'. In the infinitive Turkish verbs have the ending -mak or -mek. The ending -ak(a) however also exists in Ukrainian, in words with meanings somewhat related to each other, such as huljáka, 'crouser' (crouse = brisk, lively, confident), pyjak(a), 'drunkard', rozbyšaka, 'brigand', and that might have led to the initial meaning of 'to chase, to pursue' evolving to mean 'chaser, pursuer', and finally 'insurgent'. In different other languages the meaning of 'brigand' given to hajdamak(a) took shape in accordance to the way their enemies saw the hajdamaks.

In Ottoman Turkish, haydamak used to mean "a cattle-lifter, marauder", and in modern Turkish it means "to attack, raid, drive cattle".

=== Other Ukrainian terms ===
Other more ancient exonyms of the same haidamaks include levenetz and deineka. Equivalents of haidamaka include opryshok in Ukrainian Galicia. In folklore tradition participants of haidamak bands were frequently known as burlak(a)s, derived from the Tatar word meaning "vagrant, homeless person", although with time that word would also start to be used for migrant workers (see burlak).

=== In other languages ===
The Romanian word haidamac means 'strong, sometimes no-good man'.

The words hajduk used in Central Europe and the Balkans has a similar meaning.

=== Historical connotations ===
Because of the massacres of Jews, Jesuits, Uniates, and Polish nobility, the Polish language term Hajdamactwo became a pejorative label for Ukrainians as a whole. However, Ukrainian folklore and literature generally treat the actions of the haidamaks positively, with some notable exceptions. Haidamaky (1841), an epic poem by Taras Shevchenko, treats its subjects both sympathetically and critically.

== History ==
=== Emergence ===
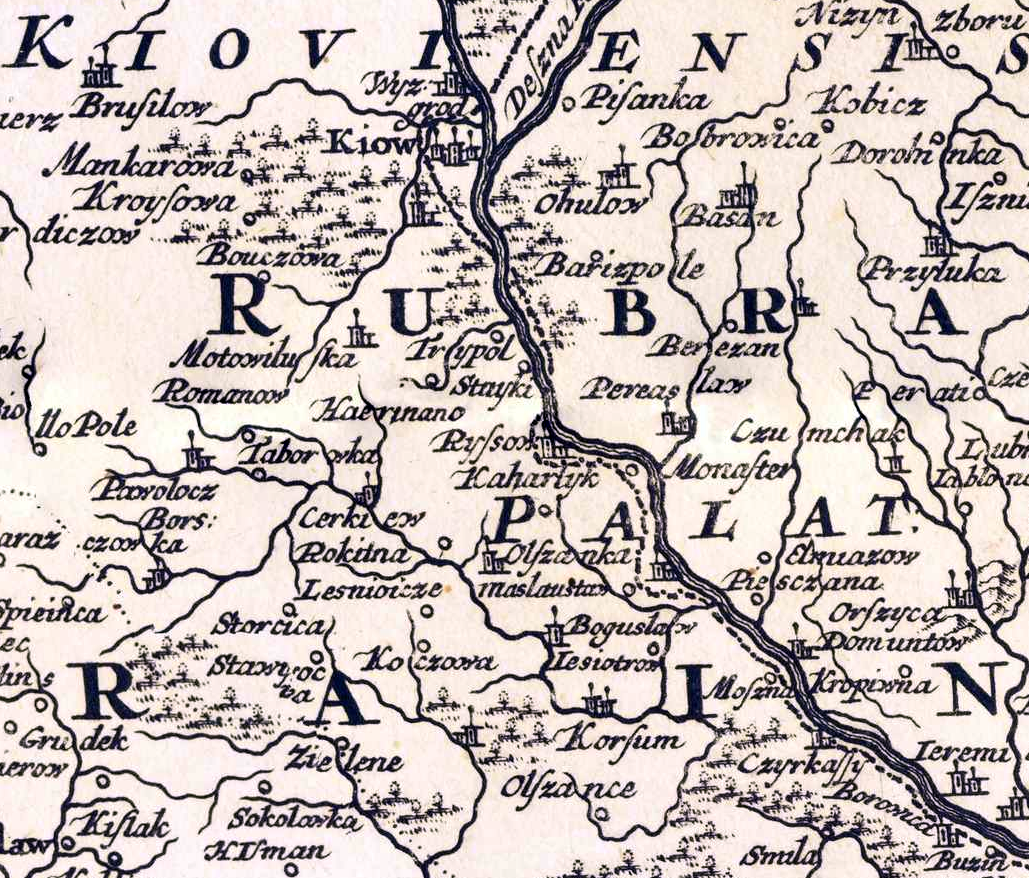
A 1720 map by Johann Homann, showing the areas of Right-bank Ukraine where haidamaks based their activities

The term "haidamak" was used in Polish and Muscovite sources in relation to Cossacks starting from the time of Khmelnytsky Uprising in the mid-17th century. However, the emergence of haidamaks as a separate phenomenon is related to the consequences of the Treaty of Prut, which was signed in 1711 and led to a renewed partition of Ukraine between Muscovy and Poland. Starting from that time, Cossacks loyal to hetman Pylyp Orlyk and the Zaporozhian Sich engaged in raids on Right-bank Ukraine in order to expel the Polish administration from the area. Those "unruly Cossacks" became widely known as haidamaks. The first mention of the work "haidamaka" in official documents dates from 1717.

Haidamaks waged war mainly against the Polish nobility and collaborationists in Right-bank Ukraine, though the movement was not limited to the right bank only, and they participated in Zaporozhian raids on the Cossack szlachta in Left-bank Ukraine as well. The latter raids occasionally deteriorated to common robbery and murder, for example in the so-called Matsapura case in the Left Bank in 1740.

The haidamak movement included representatives of various social strata: peasants, townspeople, impoverished nobles, Cossacks and even monks. They engaged in attacks against merchants, officials and small army units, robbed warehouses and destroyed estates. Haidamak outfits were usually led by Zaporozhian Cossacks not aligned with any neighbouring power. Living in the lands of Zaporozhian Sich, Cossack Hetmanate and Ottoman Ukraine, they remained outside of the reach of Polish authorities, and many even took official positions in government and military. From time to time, haidamaks would gather in military encampments (sich) to prepare for the next campaign. Local population in Dnieper Ukraine, including monks from local Orthodox monasteries, widely supported the rebels, recognizing them as protectors of their civic, religious and economic rights, delivered them food, supplied with weapons, provided shelter and warned about enemy presence. Many joined the ranks of haidamaks themselves.

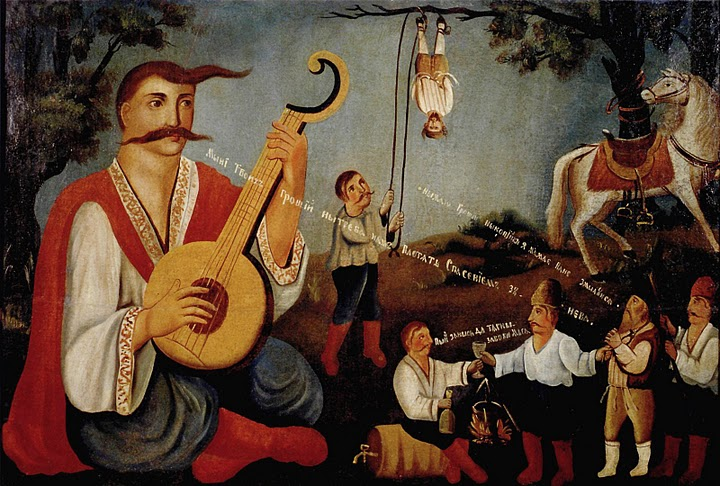
Cossack Mamay and the Haidamaka hang a Jew by his heels. Ukrainian folk art, 19th century

Usually gathering in spring, when trees started providing cover for their movements, haidamak bands would travel across the border area between the nominally Russian-controlled lands of Zaporozhian Sich and areas ruled by Poland-Lithuania, and established their base in the Black Forest, a woodland area located between the towns of Smila, Kamianka and Chyhyryn. Joined by peasants living in the area, they would raid manors of local nobles and Jewish arendators, attack Catholic churches and other objects. One of the main centres of haidamak activity was the Motronyn Monastery near Chyhyryn, then part of the Polish-Lithuanian Commonwealth. In 1717 the post of its hegumen was taken by a former Cossack sotnyk Ustym Sakhnenko (clerical name Ignatius), who headed the monastery for almost 40 years and turned it into a refuge for Zaporozhians. The first big wave of haidamak rebellions, which took place in 1729–1730, saw the emergence of rebel bands in nearby Chyhyryn and Medvedivka.

=== Haidamak uprisings ===
Opposition to the szlachta and to Roman Catholics led to the haidamaka rebellions (haidamachchyna). Three major uprisings took place, in 1734, 1750, and the largest – usually referred to as Koliyivschyna – in 1768.

==== 1734 ====
The first uprising came during the war for control of the Polish Kingdom in 1734 after the death of Frederick Augustus II in 1733. Russian troops were brought to Right-bank Ukraine in order to remove King Stanisław I (Leszczyński), and their command issued a procamation to local inhabitants, calling for their support. This appeal was interpreted by local Cossacks, soldiers, peasants and simple criminals as a permission to attack the lords, and soon haidamak outfits started operating in the locality. One of the most notable was commanded by Verlan, a former sotnyk who had served in the militia of Lubomirski family in Sharhorod. After declaring himself a colonel, Verlan led his supporters to storm Zhvanets, Brody and Zbarazh, later retreating to Moldavia. Other powerful haidamak squads were headed by Zaporozhian Cossacks Matviy Hryva and Vedmid, who operated until 1736, attacking noble manors and several cities, including Vinnytsia, Pavoloch, Skvyra, Pohrebyshche, Kryliv and Chyhyryn, and by Sava Chalyi, a former servant of Czetwertyński family. The insurrection spread to Podolia and Volhynia. After Augustus III gained the throne of Poland-Lithuania in 1734, the Russian military suppressed the uprising, although small raids by haidamakas against Polish nobility continued in the following years under the leadership of Hnat Holy.

==== 1750 ====
Captured haidamaks were executed according to the norms of military law, with many of them being hanged on the Russian-Polish border as a warning. Despite such measures, by 1737 haidamak bands were once again raiding the area, and their activity was registered in the outskirts of Letychiv, Smila, Bila Tserkva, Sharhorod, Nemyriv, Lysianka and Subotiv. Between 1737 and 1741, 110 Cossacks were hanged by the military administration of Uman on suspicion of haidamak activities. Due to the lack of military personnel in the Commonwealth army, many squads fighting haidamaks consisted of fellow Cossacks, who were in many cases unreliable.

Authorities of Russian Empire, in their turn, issued demands to exterminate the haidamak movement in Zaporozhian territories to the Sich leadership, and dispatched troops to aid them, but those were in many cases inefficient and couldn't stop the growth of the movement. In 1750 another uprising occurred as the haidamakas continued to receive popular sympathy. Based in the lands of the Zaporozhian Cossacks, they moved into the south of the Kiev Palatinate, generating a rebellion which engulfed almost the whole Right-Bank Ukraine. Although the rebels captured a number of towns and areas, they were eventually crushed due to lack of organization.

==== 1768 ====
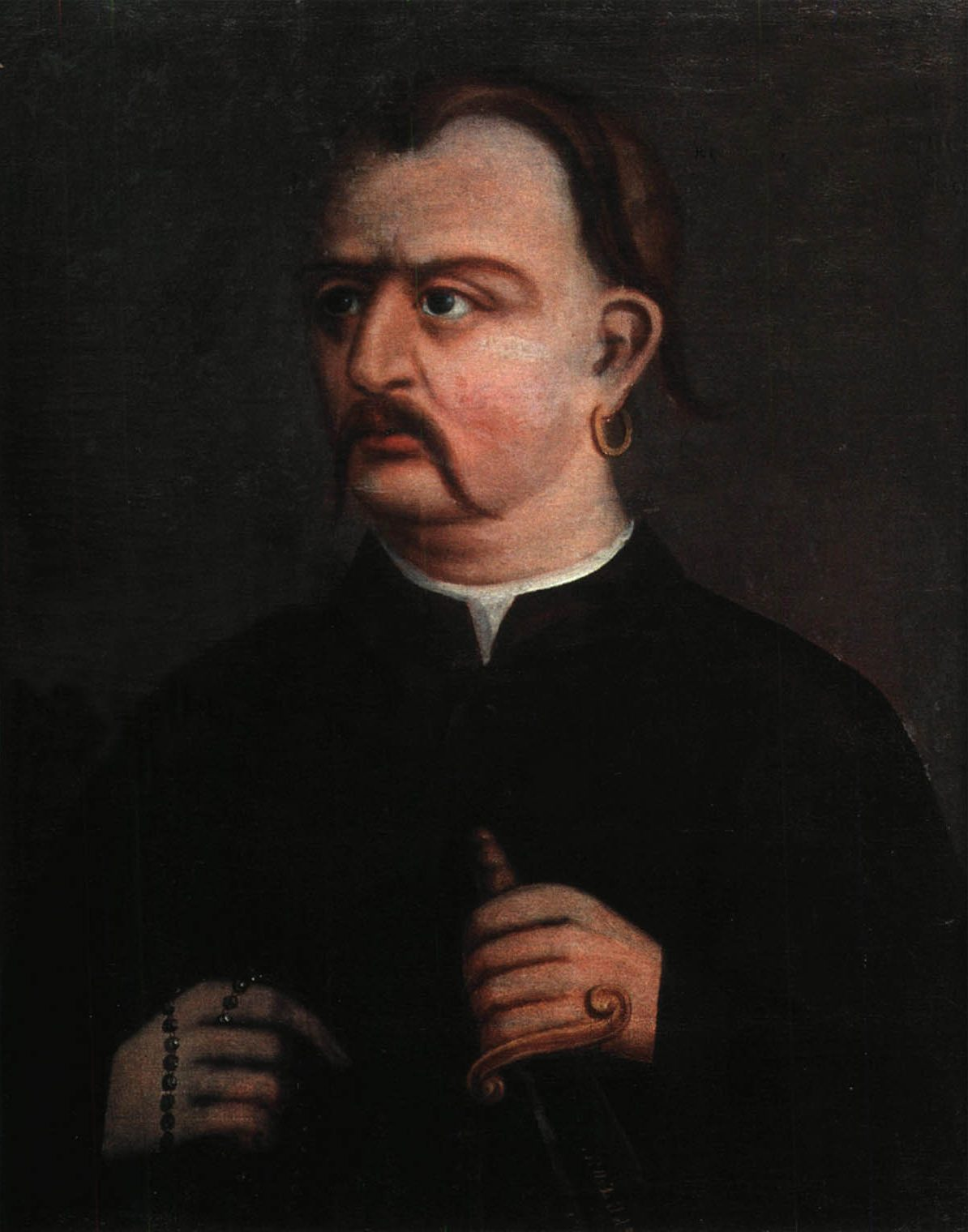
A portrait of Maksym Zalizniak

Unlike the previous revolts, the haidamak uprising of 1768 had an additional religious character. Following a call issued by Melkhisedek Znachko-Yavorsky, hegumen of Motronyn Monastery and locum tenens of Pereiaslav eparchy in Right-bank Ukraine, over 150 parishes in the region declared their conversion to Orthodoxy. As a result, in 1766 Uniate church administration started a wave of repression against the "schismatics", arresting Yavorsky and causing a furore among the local Orthodox population. One of Yavorsky's supporters was executed on accusations of instigating a revolt, which exacerbated the conflict.

A spark which ignited the new rebellion was the uprising of Bar Confederation, whose supporters issed the motto of "defense of faith and freedom", forcibly convening the local population in Kaniv, Chyhyryn and Smila, making them pledge allegiance to their revolt and threatening to eradicate the "schismatics". In late March 1768, a Cossack named Maksym Zalizniak, who at the time served as a monk at the Motronyn Monastery, was visited by several Zaporozhians headed by Yukhym Shelest, who presented him a letter supposedly written by the kish otaman, urging them to start a campaign against the Confederates and Jews. The original letter was never discovered, and Shelest himself was killed in a quarrel several days later, but the rumours about the upcoming rebellion spread around the vicinity, and by the end of April up to 1000 insurgents had gathered in Kholodny Yar not far from the monastery. They elected Zalizniak otaman, and one of the priests performed a moleben for the success of the campaign.

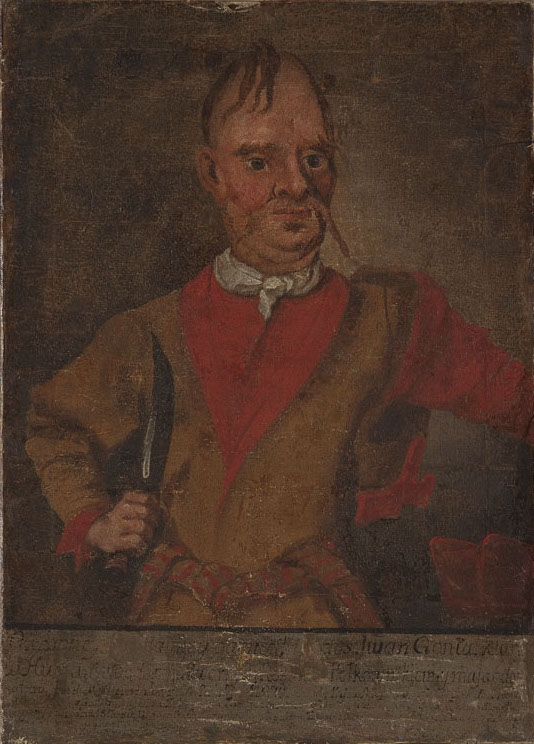
A portrait of Ivan Gonta

In late May, following the entry of Russian forces into Right-bank Ukraine, the detachment left Kholodny Yar, and in early June Zalizniak issued universals, calling for the murder of Poles and Jews. Among the locals, stories emerged about the existence of a "Golden Charter", supposedly issued by the empress and allowing to destroy the whole Polish and Jewish population. Contemporary observers considered the rebellion to be a consequence of a deliberate provocation by Russian authorities, who aimed to use social tensions, xenophobia and religious fanaticism of Ukrainian peasants and Cossacks for their own benefit. Zalizniak's squad soon increased its size to 2,000, and passed across nearby cities and villages such as Medvedivka, Zhabotyn, Smila, Korsun, Bohuslav, Kaniv and Lysianka, slaughtering their Polish and Jewish inhabitants. On 20–21 June Zalizniak's forces approached Uman, which was guarded by the local militia of Potocki family headed by Ivan Gonta. After the town had been surrounded, Gonta joined the rebels, and the fortifications were soon overwhelmed. As a result, thousands of people, most of them Jews, Poles and Uniates, both local inhabitants and refugees from nearby areas, were massacred. Among the victims were 400 students of the local Basilian college, whose bodies were thrown into wells.

Along with Zalizniak's detachment, around 30 smaller rebel squads were active during the rebellion, which spread across the territories of Kiev and Bracław Voivodeships, as well as large chunks of Volhynia and Podolia. In captured territories the nobility, Ukrainian Catholics, Jesuits and above all the Jews, were murdered en masse, which led to a quick response by the Polish army. In late June or early July, one of the haidamak bands crossed the Ottoman border and burned the town of Balta, causing an international scandal. As a result, Russian troops encircled the main haidamak encampment near Uman and arrested over 1000 people. Most of them, being subjects of the Commonwealth, were transferred to the Polish side, while the rest were transported to Kyiv. Those haidamaks delivered to the Poles were executed, with Gonta himself being quartered. Those kept by the Russian side, among them Maksym Zalizniak, were sentenced to whipping and tagging, had their nostrils torn and were exiled to Nerchinsk katorga.

==== Later rebellions ====
Separate haidamak squads continued their activities during the later part of the 18th century in the Right and Left Banks, as well as in Sloboda Ukraine, but their numbers and scope of activities never exceeded those reached during the rebellions of 1730-1760s. The last flare-up of the haidamak violence occurred in 1830s, during the Ustym Karmaliuk rebellion. This final chapter of haidamak history was unique in large part due to the support the rebellion enjoyed not only among the peasantry, but also among the Poles and the Jews, who were marginalized and rendered destitute by the Russian Empire.

== Tactics and structure ==
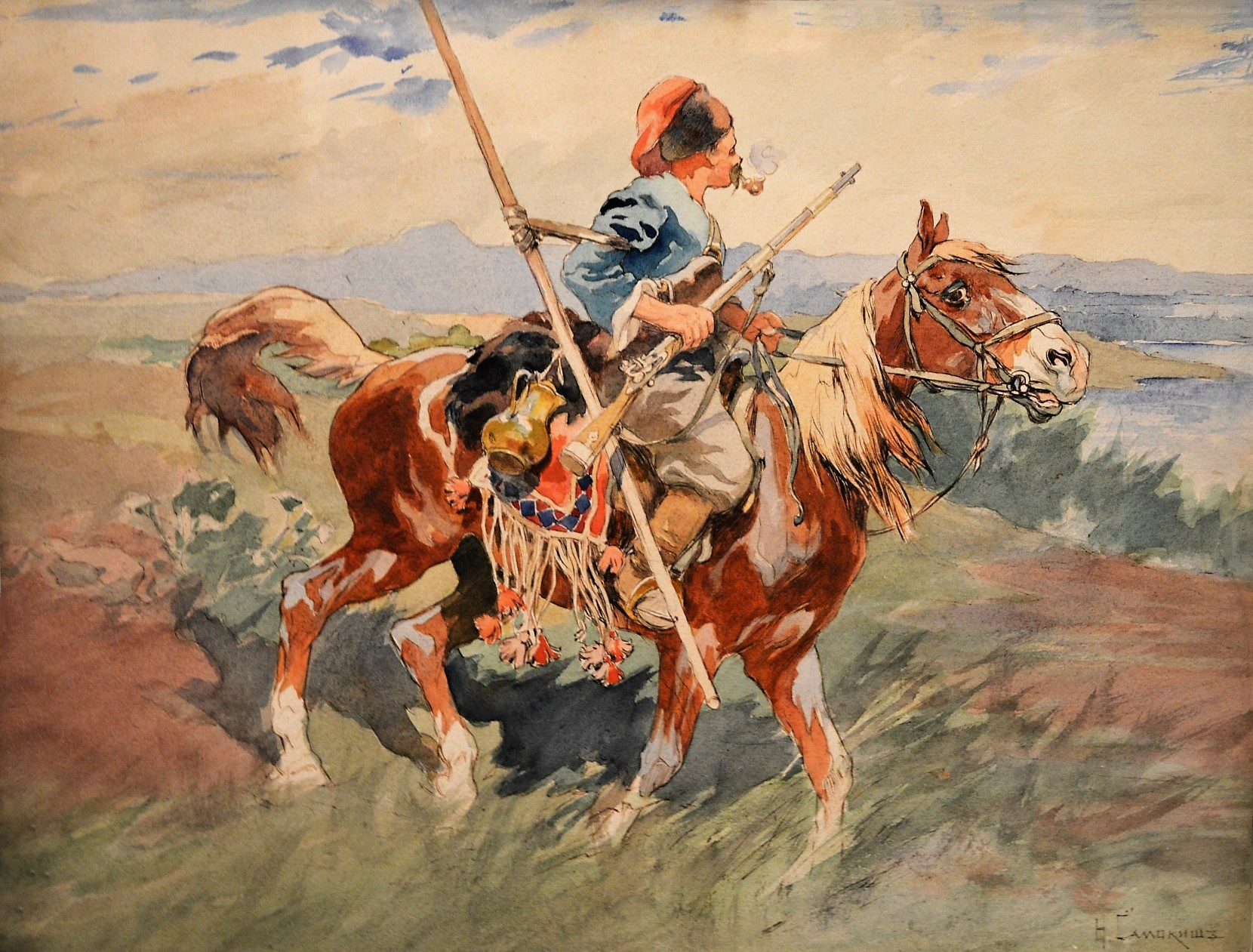
Haidamak on a Horse (1899) by Mykola Samokysh

Haidamaks employed tactics commonly used by steppe inhabitants such as Cossacks and Tatars. After finding a protected place, they would establish a camp known as kish (from Turkish koş). Every haidamak staying at the camp would take with himself two horses in order to provide faster movement during raids. After each group returned with its booty, the band would gather to share the spoils, and then swiftly flee across the border. Good knowledge of the local landscape allowed haidamaks to evade pursuit. The main object of haidamak raids was cattle, which would be sold in surrounding towns and at the Sich. Part of the profits from their raiding activities would be shared with the Cossack leadership of a nearby palanka.

A typical haidamak band (ватага - vataha) would consist of 300 to 500 men headed by an elected otaman, who would be sometimes aided by an osavul. Its core was composed of Zaporozhian Cossacks, but Cossacks and peasants from other areas could also join, creating separate companies. Haidamaks could move both on horseback and as infantry. Some haidamak outfits even had their own banners to be used during campaigns. According to contemporary sources, haidamak bands were known for their discipline, and would evacuate comrades-in-arms who were killed and wounded using carts, and organized solemn military funerals for those killed in battle.

== Legacy ==
=== Among Ukrainians ===
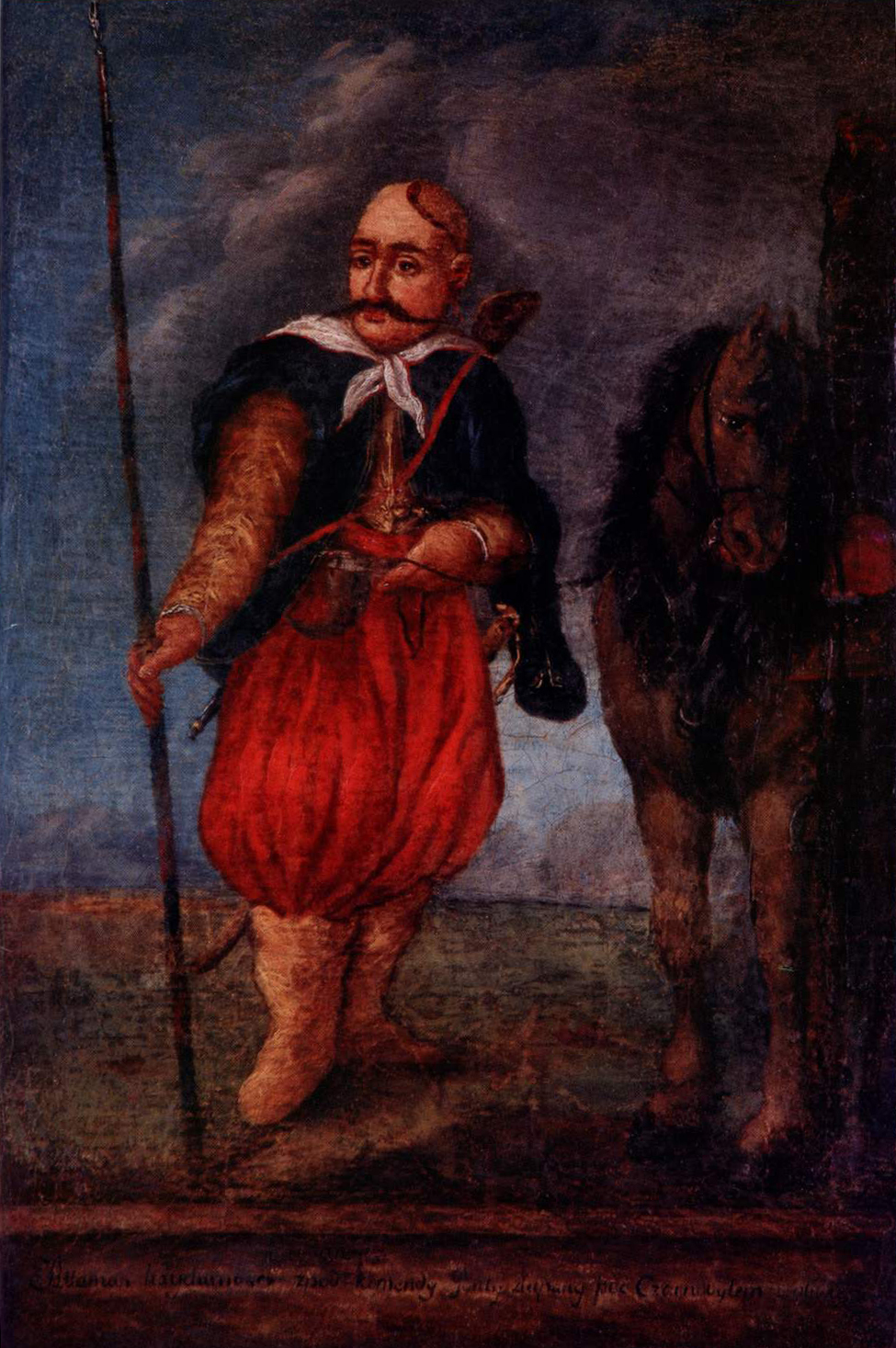
A folk painting of Ivan Bondarenko, one of the haidamak leaders during Koliivshchyna

Ukrainian poet Taras Shevchenko presented a romanticized depiction of the haidamak movement in his poems Haidamaky (1841) and Cold Ravine (1845).

During the Ukrainian War of Independence, starting from 1917, a number of military formations fighting in support of the Ukrainian People's Republic adopted the name of haidamaks in their official designations. The most notable among them were the Kost Hordiyenko Haidamaka Cavalry Regiment, headed by Vsevolod Petriv, and the Haidamaka Kish of Sloboda Ukraine under command of Symon Petliura, which played an important role during the suppression of Kiev Arsenal January Uprising.

During the second half of 20th century the commemoration of haidamaks was promoted by Soviet Ukrainian authorities. In 1967 Cold Ravine, the historical base of haidamaks, was visited by Petro Shelest, First Secretary of the Communist Party of Ukraine, who was claimed to be a descendant of one of the haidamak leaders. Plans were made to turn the area into a memorial object, which would include a museum of Koliivshchyna, but those were never realized due to Shelest's removal from power in 1972.

A modern Ukrainian folk rock band performs under the name Haydamaky.

== See also ==
- Hajduk
- Ustym Karmaliuk (1787–1835), Ukrainian outlaw, the "Ukrainian Robin Hood" or "the last haydamak"
- Khmelnytsky Uprising 1649–1657
