= Ivan Gonta =

Ukrainian rebellion leader

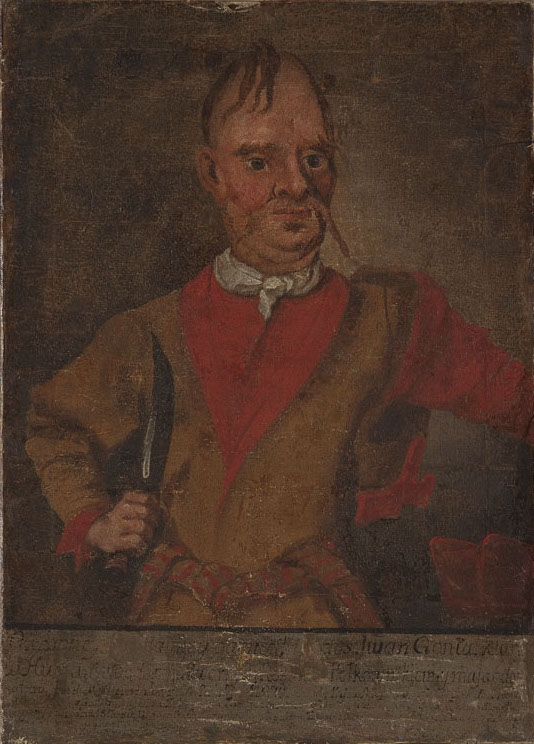
- Ivan Gonta
- Born: c. 1705; Rożyszki (now Rozsishky), Bracław Voivodeship (now Cherkasy Oblast, Ukraine)
- Died: 1768 (aged 62–63); Serby (now Hontivka), Bracław Voivodeship (now Vinnytsia oblast, Ukraine)
- Known for: One of the leaders of the Koliivshchyna
- Children: Moses; Eustraty

Ivan Gonta (Ukrainian: Іван Ґонта), also known in contemporary sources as Gontenko (Old Ukrainian: Ґонтенко); c. 1705 (Note: The fact that Ivan Gonta was born in 1705 is stated in the inscription on his portrait.) – 1768) was one of the leaders of the Koliivshchyna, an armed rebellion of peasants and Ukrainian Cossacks against Bar confederation in the Polish–Lithuanian Commonwealth.

Born in Rożyszki (modern Rozsishky) near Uman' in Bracław Voivodship, Gonta served as a sotnik (captain) of Cossack household militia of Franciszek Salezy Potocki, the Voivode of Kiev, and commanded a small unit in the garrison of Uman since 1757. During the Koliivshchyna he was ordered to fight the approaching haidamaka forces of Maksym Zalizniak. Instead, he and his militia joined the rebels, and the joint forces captured and ravaged the town of Uman on June 21, 1768. In what became known as the Massacre of Uman, thousands of local Polish szlachta, Jews, Uniates and other people were slaughtered. After that, Gonta was proclaimed colonel and commanded the garrison of Uman.

When Gonta sent a detachment to spread rebellion into the Ottoman Empire, Catherine the Great, the Empress of Russia, dispatched a regiment of Don Cossacks fighting against Bar confederation to help Poland suppress the rebellion to prevent Ottomans from waging a war against Russia. The commander of the Russian unit, Guriev, made the rebels believe he was siding with them for the joint trip against Bar confederation and managed to capture approximately 900 of them without a single shot. After that, Ivan Gonta was handed over to the Poles and was tried for high treason. Sentenced to death by grand Crown Hetman Franciszek Ksawery Branicki, he was then executed in the village of Serby by being flayed alive and quartered.

Although largely non-notable during his life, after his death he became a hero of countless folk songs and legends that portrayed him as a hero and a martyr. He was immortalized in Taras Shevchenko's controversial epic poem Haidamaky though Gonta had never killed his Roman Catholic sons.

== In popular culture ==
- Taras Shevchenko's epic poem Haidamaky dedicated to participants of the Koliivshchyna including Gonta.
