= Melkhisedek (Znachko-Yavorsky) =

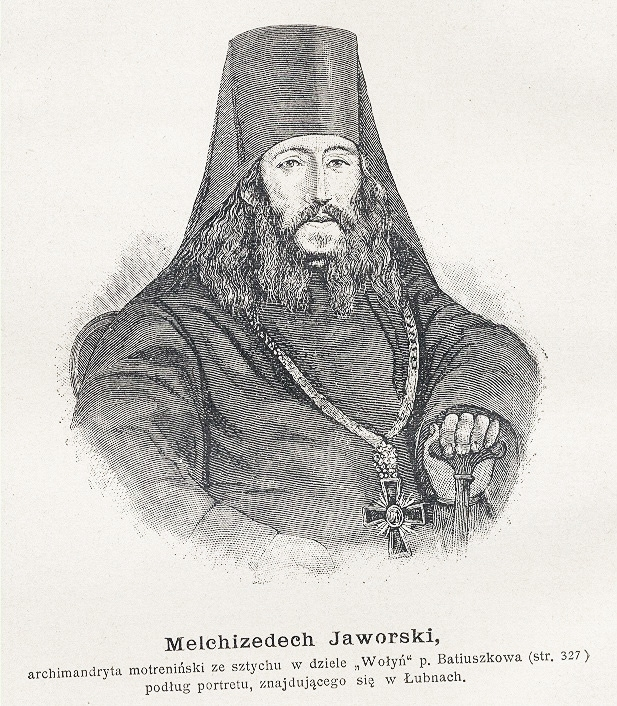
Archimandrite Melkhisedek

Melkhisedek (Znachko-Yavorsky) (Ukrainian: Мельхіседек (Значко-Яворський)) was a famous religious figure and Archimandrite of the Kyivan Rus-Ukraine. As a religious leader of the Eastern Orthodox Church in the area, he played a key role during the Cossack-Christian uprising of XVIII century on the banks of river Dnipro called Koliivshchyna.

Melkhisedek was born as Matviy around 1716 to the Lubny sotnik Karp Kostysh with a Cossack's nickname Znachko who in 1766 received an official certificate of affiliation with a noble family of Yavorsky. In 1738 Melkhisedek graduated from the Kyiv Academy. Same year he entered the Motronyn Holy Trinity monastery near Chyhyryn (today a nunnery). In 1745 Melkhisedek received monastic vows. In 1753 – 1768 he was a hegumen of the monastery.

In 1761 Melkhisedek was placed in charge of all Orthodox monasteries and churches in the right-bank Ukraine by Bishop Hevrasiy Lyntsevsky and was suffragan to the Bishop of Pereyaslav. He was expressing a negative attitude toward the 1596 Union of Brest and defended interests of Orthodox church in right-bank Ukraine. Also Melkhisedek shown remarkable organizational abilities and extraordinary energy in defending Orthodox faith against advances of Uniate clergy in 1750-60s as well as established permanent relations with the Bishop of Mstislav, Orsha, and Mogilev Georgy (Konysky).

In 1765 on several occasions Melkhisedek was received by the Empress Catherine the Great who on 8 September 1765 issued a rescript to her envoy in Warsaw Nicholas Repnin whom she obligated to obtain from the Polish authorities to stop religious oppression against Orthodox at the Right bank, particularly in voivodeships of Kyiv and Braclaw. In 1766 during paying a visit to the King of Poland Stanisław August Poniatowski, Melkhisedek asked from him a privilege which would guaranteed the rights of Orthodox. He obtained remarkable popularity among Ukrainian population of the Right bank.

In July 1766 Melkhisedek was arrested by the Polish administration, but was freed thanks to numerous petitions from relatives, the Bishop of Pereyaslav Hervasiy, and the Tsarist government. His activities made a significant impact on development of Koliivshchyna Haidamaka uprising. The Polish government accused him in preparation of the uprising and relations with Maksym Zalizniak, but has not been able to prove it. The fact that Melkhisedek blessed knives of haidamkas was acknowledged by Ukrainian philologist Panteleimon Kulish. The important role of Melkhisedek in Koliivshchyna mentioned in his works by Ukrainian historian Mykola Arkas. Following the end of uprising in 1768, on request of the Polish Crown Melkhisedek was appointed a hegumen of the Pereyaslav Saint Michael Monastery as he was banned to appear at the Right bank.

In 1771–1783 Melkhisedek was a hegumen of the Sophia Monastery in Kyiv. Since 1774 he was a hegumen of Vydubychi Saint Michael Monastery and since 1781 – Mhar Saviour-Transfiguration Monastery in Lubny. In 1783 Melkhisedek received a rank of archimandrite. Later he also was a hegumen of the Saints Peter and Paul Monastery in Hlukhiv.

== See also ==
- Ukrainian Orthodox Church (Moscow Patriarchate)
