= Koliivshchyna =

Uprising in Ukraine in June 1768

Koliivshchyna rebellion
- Part of Bar Confederation and Haidamaky uprisings
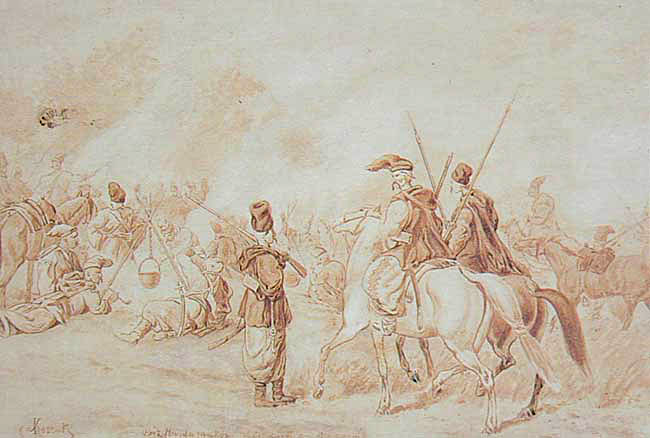
- Camp of Haidamakas by Juliusz Kossak
Date	6 June [O.S. 26 May] 1768 – June 1769
Location	Right-bank Ukraine (Kyiv and Braclaw voivodeships), Polish–Lithuanian Commonwealth
Result	Russian-Polish-Lithuanian victory

Belligerents
Polish–Lithuanian Commonwealth; Russian Empire	Haidamaks

Commanders and leaders
Jan Klemens Branicki; Mikhail Krechetnikov	Melkhisedek Znachko-Yavorsky (surrendered); Maksym Zalizniak (POW); Ivan Gonta (executed)

Casualties and losses
- over 10,000 civilians killed

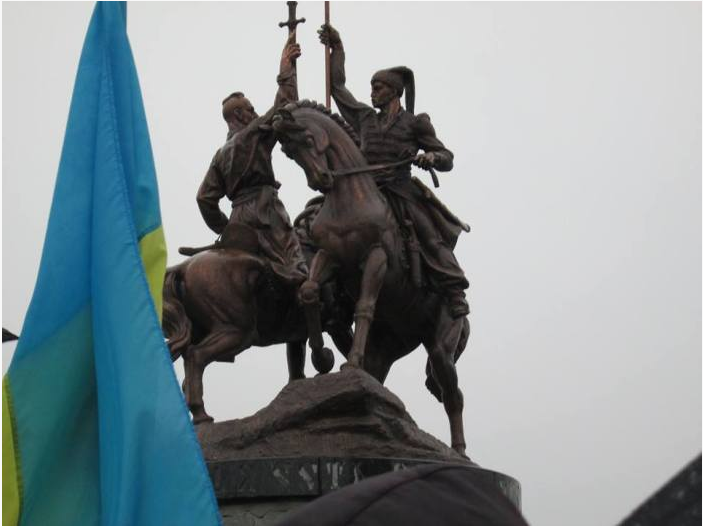
Monument of Gonta and Zalizniak in Uman, Ukraine

The Koliivshchyna (Ukrainian: Коліївщина; Polish: koliszczyzna) was a major haidamaky rebellion that broke out in Right-bank Ukraine in June 1768, caused by the dissatisfaction of peasants with the treatment of Orthodox Christians by the Bar Confederation and serfdom, as well as by hostility of Cossacks and peasants to the local Polonized Ruthenian nobility and ethnic Poles. The uprising was accompanied by pogroms against both real and imagined supporters of the Bar Confederation, particularly ethnic Poles, Jews, Roman Catholics, and especially Byzantine Catholic priests and laity. This culminated in the massacre of Uman. The number of victims is estimated from 100,000 to 200,000. Many communities of national minorities (such as Old Believers, Armenians, Muslims and Greeks) completely disappeared in the areas devastated by the uprising.

== Etymology ==
The origin of the word Koliivshchyna is not certain. Taras Shevchenko, whose grandfather had participated in the uprising, wrote a poem, Haydamaky, in which kolii is described as a knife that is blessed in a church and used by Ukrainian villagers to kill animals humanely, according to the local understanding of animal rights. The blessing of knives had occurred two or three weeks before the uprising as a rule, so the members and supporters of the Bar Confederation and its military forces fled to the Ottoman Empire before the uprising. However, some fortresses such as Uman and Lysianka were still occupied by the members of the Bar Confederation.

The term could also be an adaptation of the Polish words kolej, kolejno, po kolei, which implies służba kolejna (patrolling service), designating Cossack militia in the service of aristocrats. That etymology is suggested by Polish historians such as Władysław Andrzej Serczyk and Ukrainian Volodymyr Shcherbyna.

== Events ==
The rebellion was simultaneous to the Confederation of Bar, which originated in an adjacent region in the city of Bar (historical Podolia) and was a de facto civil war in the Polish–Lithuanian Commonwealth. The Bar Confederation declared not only the Orthodox faith but the Uniate church to be pro-Russian. Later, the Polish government and Roman Catholic church accused both Eastern Churches of responsibility on the Uman massacre and the uprising because Russia supported the political rights of believers of both churches. Though almost all pupils of the Uman Uniate seminary had died in the massacre, they were accused of the fall of the city by the Polish government.

The rebellion of peasants was fueled by ducats paid by Maxim Zalizniak for every killed Bar Confederate and by the circulation of a fictitious proclamation of support and call to arms by Russian Empress Catherine II, the so-called "Golden Charter". Mostly based on rumours, the charter, however, had a real foundation and was connected with the Repnin sejm's decisions to give political freedoms to Uniates and Orthodox Christians. Catherine issued a rescript in 1765 to Archimandrite Melkhisedek and made the Russian ambassador in Warsaw facilitate assertion of the rights and privileges of the Orthodox in Right-bank Ukraine. In 1764, on the territory of the Zaporozhian Host and along the southern borders of the Polish–Lithuanian Commonwealth, the Russian Empire created the New Russia Governorate in place of the previously-existing New Serbia province and intensively militarised the region.

Preparations for the uprising against the Bar Confederation and the initial raid of the Cossack detachment of Maksym Zalizniak started at the Motronynskyi Holy Trinity Monastery (now a convent in Cherkasy Raion), the hegumen of which was Archimandrite Melkhisedek (Znachko-Yavorsky), who also served as the director of all Orthodox monasteries and churches in Right-bank Ukraine in 1761–1768.

In 1767 a group of Zaporozhian Cossacks headed by Yosyp Shelest settled in a number of monasteries in the vicinity of the Dnieper. Posing as monks, they agitated the inhabitants of surrounding villages to start a rebellion against Polish nobility, using a fake letter from Kish otaman of Zaporozhian Sich Petro Kalnyshevskyi, which supposedly allowed them to expel and disown Poles and Jews living in the area. The rebels also created a fortification (sich) in the Kholodnyi Yar ("Cold Ravine") area not far from the Motronynskyi Monastery, which included two big stables and contained cauldrons for cooking. In spring of 1768 Shelest was killed in a quarrel with one of his companions, and after that the rebels were headed by Maksym Zalizniak, a native of the neighbouring village of Ivkivtsi. On 26 May Zalizniak and his men had their weapons blessed in the monastery and started their uprising.

The peasant rebellion quickly gained momentum and spread over the territory from the right bank of the Dnieper River to the river Sian. The Massacre of Uman had many Poles, Jews, and Uniates herded into their churches and synagogues and killed in cold blood, but Uniates were not among the victims in other places:

Crowds of insurgents broke into the city [...] Most of the nobles and Jews gathered in the churches, synagogue and town hall. Catholic priests communicated and gave absolution [...] the slaughter initiated, most likely by vengeful peasants, began. According to modern testimonies, about three thousand Jews died in the synagogue alone. Killed and tormented. Jews had their hands and ears cut off. They were pulled out of cellars, houses and even ditches, where they sought shelter in vain. Catholic and Uniate priests became the next victims of the hatred of the insurgent crowd.

After advancing to Uman, Zalizniak's forces were joined by Ivan Gonta, who commanded the private militia serving the owner of Uman, Polish count Franciszek Salezy Potocki. The governor of Uman and other Polish nobles supporting the Bar Confederation capitulated since they believed that Gonta had been dispatched by Potocki to protect Uman in a secret mission and mistakenly thought that the rebels supported the Polish king, as did Potocki. Upon the capture of the city Zalizniak was proclaimed hetman by his supporters. On the order of Zalizniak, a haidamak band led by Semen Nezhyvyi captured Kaniv. There were rumours that Don Cossacks participated in fighting against the Bar Confederation supporting Zaporozhian Cossacks. Some were seized by Polish government forces and tried in Kodnya.

Eventually, the uprising was crushed by Russian troops, registered Cossacks of Left-Bank Ukraine and the Zaporozhian Host, aided by the Polish army. The two leaders were arrested by Russian troops on 7 July 1768. Ivan Gonta was handed over to Polish authorities, who tortured him to death, and Maksym Zalizniak was exiled to Siberia. The rebellion was suppressed by the joint forces of Polish and Russian armies, with numerous hangings, decapitations, quarterings and impalings of Polish subjects and of the Russian subjects who were captured by governmental Polish forces themselves. In Kholodnyi Yar, which served as the base of the rebellion, sporadic fighting against Russian troops sent to subdue the rebels continued until the end of the year.

== In popular culture ==
Taras Shevchenko's epic poem Haidamaky (The Haidamakas) chronicles the events of the Koliivshchyna. The event also inspired recent artwork during the Revolution of Dignity.

== Controversy ==
On 17 May 2018 the Kyiv City Council voted to hold events marking 250 years since Koliivshchyna; the proposal was put forward by two deputies of the ultranationalist Svoboda party. The decision received strong criticism from the Ukrainian Jewish community and the Kharkiv Human Rights Protection Group.
