= Władysław Andrzej Serczyk =

Władysław Andrzej Serczyk (23 July 1935 – 5 January 2014) was a Polish historian-Ukrainist. Born in Kraków, he after graduating Jagiellonian University stayed in the university and began his scientific career. In 1963, he received his doctorate and in 1968 Serczyk received his habilitation. Since 1976 he was a professor. In 1974-1978, Serczyk was a director of Jagiellonian Library. In 1986–1996, he headed a branch of University of Warsaw in Białystok, Institute of History of Eastern Europe (today University of Białystok).

== Publications ==
- Gospodarstwo magnackie w województwie podolskim w drugiej poł. XVIII wieku (1965)
- Koliszczyzna (1968)
- Lenin w Krakowie i na Podhalu (1970)
- Hajdamacy (1972, 1978)
- Piotr Wielki (1973, 1977, 1990, 2003)
- Katarzyna II carowa Rosji (1974, 1983, 1989, 1995, 2004)
- Iwan IV Groźny (1977, 1986, 1993, 2004)
- Wielka Socjalistyczna Rewolucja Październikowa. Zarys historyczny (1977)
- Historia Ukrainy (1979, 1990, 2001, 2009)
- Związek Radziecki w latach 1921-1925 (1980)
- Połtawa 1709 (1982, 2004)
- Kultura rosyjska XVIII wieku (1984)
- Na dalekiej Ukrainie. Dzieje Kozaczyzny do 1648 roku (1984, 1986, 2008, 2016)
- Kijów (1986)
- Poczet władców Rosji. Romanowowie (1992)
- Początek końca: konfederacja barska i I rozbiór Polski (1997)
- Na płonącej Ukrainie. Dzieje Kozaczyzny 1648-1651 (1998, 1999, 2007, 2009, 2016)
