= Massacre of Uman =

1768 massacre of Jews, Poles, and Ukrainian Uniates in Uman

- Part of Koliivshchyna
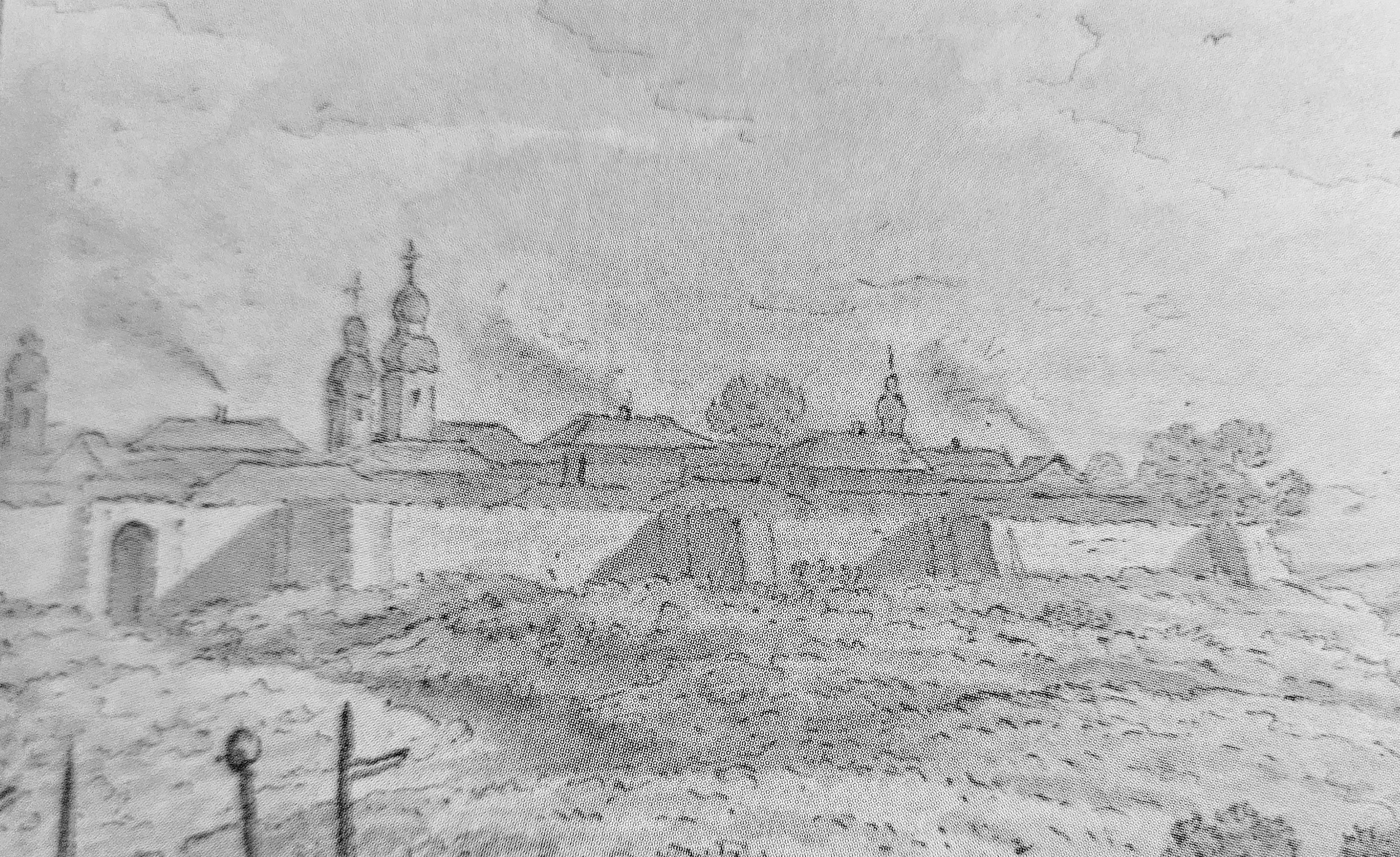
- View of Uman around 1785
- Location: Uman
- Date: June 20 or 21, 1768
- Target: Poles, Catholics, Jews
- Attack type: Massacre, Pogrom
- Deaths: 2,000–20,000
- Perpetrators: Haidamaks, local Peasants

The Massacre of Humań, or massacre of Uman (Polish: rzeź humańska; Ukrainian: "уманська різня" or "взяття Умані") was a 1768 massacre of the Jews, Poles and Ukrainian Uniates by haidamaks. The murders were committed at the town of Uman in the far eastern part of the Polish–Lithuanian Commonwealth.

Uman was a well-fortified town that held a large garrison of Bar confederation troops under the command of Rafał Mładanowicz, the governor of Uman who joined Bar Confederation. This fact made Uman one of the primary targets of Koliyivschyna movement, and it is likely that the siege of Uman was planned well in advance probably even by Russian officers. Ivan Gonta, an officer in the private militia of the owner of Uman Count Franciszek Salezy Potocki (made up of Household Cossacks) was accused of connections with haidamaka by some people from the local Jewish community three months before the siege and long before the uprising.

However, due to the lack of hard evidence and the sudden death of a star witness, no formal charges were made. Although Ivan Gonta was de facto the commander of all Uman cossacks not only of his unit of about 100 and he was not the most senior in their ranks but just he was the representative of the owner of Uman who had not supported the Bar Confederation. His participation was needed to justify the orders of Mładanowicz and others who had betrayed the owner by joining Bar confederation and giving up the city to it. The noblemen learnt from letters of the owner to Gonta captured by them that Gonta would become a Polish nobleman and the owner of villages if Gonta makes some important mission according to the order of the owner during the siege of Uman.

In early June 1768 the Ukrainian rebels under the command of Maksym Zalizniak marched on Uman after capturing Cherkasy, Korsun and Kaniv. As Zalizniak openly encouraged the slaughter of various national minorities irrespective of their faith with exception of Poles, Jews, and Romanians to be used for mixed marriages with Rusyns (as Ukrainians called themselves that time) after the conversion of Jews and Poles into the Orthodox faith and in fact Poles and Jews were killed as well, the town was filled with refugees.

A large camp filled with Polish nobility and their private militia, regular soldiers, and Jewish refugees were positioned outside the city walls. Bar Confederation troops outnumbered the forces of adult rebels, and therefore it was decided that some of the forces should guard the ramparts while Gonta and his cossack unit and all other Uman household Cossacks would meet the Haidamakas in an open battle. However, when Gonta met Zalizniak's units Gonta openly declared that he was going to join Koliyivschyna. Some sources claim that the formal commanders of two household Cossack regiments were sent by Gonta back to Uman, although the authenticity of the story is highly disputed.

== Siege and fall ==
The united troops razed the encampment on June 14 and tried to penetrate the ramparts by concealing the rebels behind the backs of Gonta's household Cossacks. However, the attempt failed, and so the siege started on June 17. On the first day, the city being surrounded, many Ukrainians deserted the ranks of Polish forces and joined the rebels when. But the majority of Ukrainians including the students of local Eastern Catholic seminary remained loyal to Mładanowicz and participated in the defense of the city.

After three days of siege the city fell to Zalizniak in spite of a courageous defense in which the Jews also played an active role. Though the city had been prepared for battles on the streets Mładanowicz and other local Bar Confederation leaders opened the gates to Zalizniak after the penetration of some Gonta Cossacks into the city. They thought that Gonta represented the owner of Uman, the king of Poland and official authorities and he was executing the will of the owner. In reality not Zaliznyak but a Russian officer was to be the leader, but this officer died just before the rebellion and gave all ducats and military plans to Zaliznyak as an honest Orthodox monk and the former Zaporozhian Cossack who was present at the death of this Russian officer.

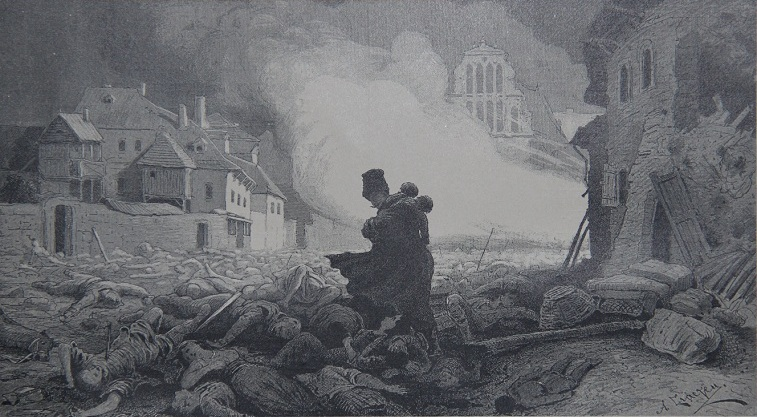
Aftermath of the massacre as depicted by Opanas Slastion

After the city had been taken, all inhabitants had been disarmed and Uman wine belonging to the owner of Uman had been consumed by rebels a violent and bloody massacre took place. Many noblemen including Mładanowicz were killed but his daughter and son were saved by Gonta being their godfather. The Jews previously disarmed by rebels then gathered in the synagogues, where they were led by Leib Shargorodski and Moses Menaker in an attempt to defend themselves, but they were destroyed by cannon fire and knives. Most of the remaining Jews in the city were subsequently killed. Gonta saved Jewish and Pole children and those who survived then after the three days of the massacre. Gonta declared that 33,000 people had been killed and he could not save them and it was his guilt. According to earlier estimates the number of Poles and Jews massacred was 20,000. The estimate given by Gonta for self-embellishment during his trial was 33,000. These numbers are considered exaggerated by modern historiography, with numbers of Poles and Jews who were killed in the “massacre of Uman” now estimated at ca. 2,000, other victims representing Ukrainians and minorities.

== See also ==
- List of massacres in Poland
- List of massacres in Ukraine
