= Motronynskyi Monastery =

Eastern Orthodox convent in Kholodnyi Yar, Ukraine

- Мотронинський монастир
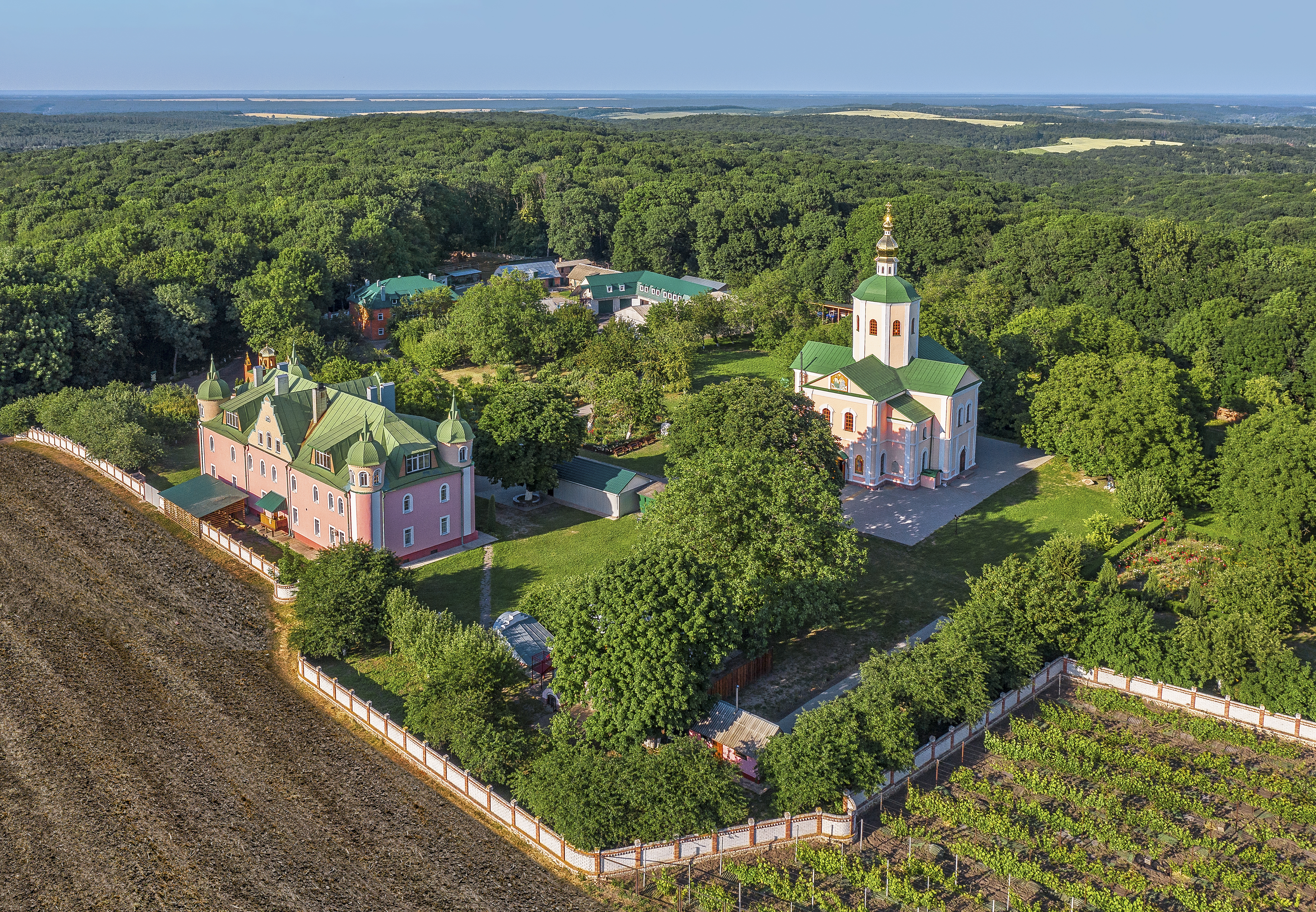

- Location within Cherkasy Oblast Location within Ukraine

Monastery information
- Full name: Motronynskyi Women's Monastery of the Holy Trinity
- Denomination: Ukrainian Orthodox Church (Moscow Patriarchate)
- Established: Before 1568
- Reestablished: 1991

Site
- Location: Kholodnyi Yar
- Country: Ukraine
- Coordinates: 49°09′13″N 32°15′20″E

The Motronynskyi Women's Monastery of the Holy Trinity (Ukrainian: Мотронинський Свято-Троїцький жіночий монастир, romanized: Motronynskyi Sviato-Troitskyi zhinochyi monastyr) is a convent of the Ukrainian Orthodox Church (Moscow Patriarchate) located in the Kholodnyi Yar forest in Ukraine's Cherkasy Oblast.

== Overview ==
The Motronynskyi Monastery was created at some point prior to 1568, though the history of a religious community in the area dates back to the 12th century. It was initially a men's monastery, and it received support from several political figures in the Zaporozhian Sich such as Petro Konashevych-Sahaidachny, Pavlo Teteria, Petro Doroshenko, and Ivan Skoropadsky. During the Ruin, the monastery was destroyed by the Ottoman Empire, Crimean Khanate, and Polish–Lithuanian Commonwealth.

The monastery played an important part in the religious life of southern Kyiv region during its early existence, and it was an organisational centre during the Koliivshchyna uprising. Taras Shevchenko depicted the monastery in his 1845 watercolour work Motryn Monastery.

In 1911, Motronynskyi Monastery's status changed from a male monastery to a nunnery. Following the Russian Revolution and the Ukrainian–Soviet War, the monastery was initially allowed to continue operating, but with 250 dessiatinas (273.13 hectares) confiscated by the Soviet government. On 21 November 1929 the monastery was fully abolished, with a commune being established in its place. The monastery was reestablished under the Ukrainian Orthodox Church (Moscow Patriarchate) in 1991.

In addition to the monastery itself, the monastery's territory contains a spring and a pond.
