= Zoya Klyuchko =

Ukrainian entomologist

- Зоя Ключко
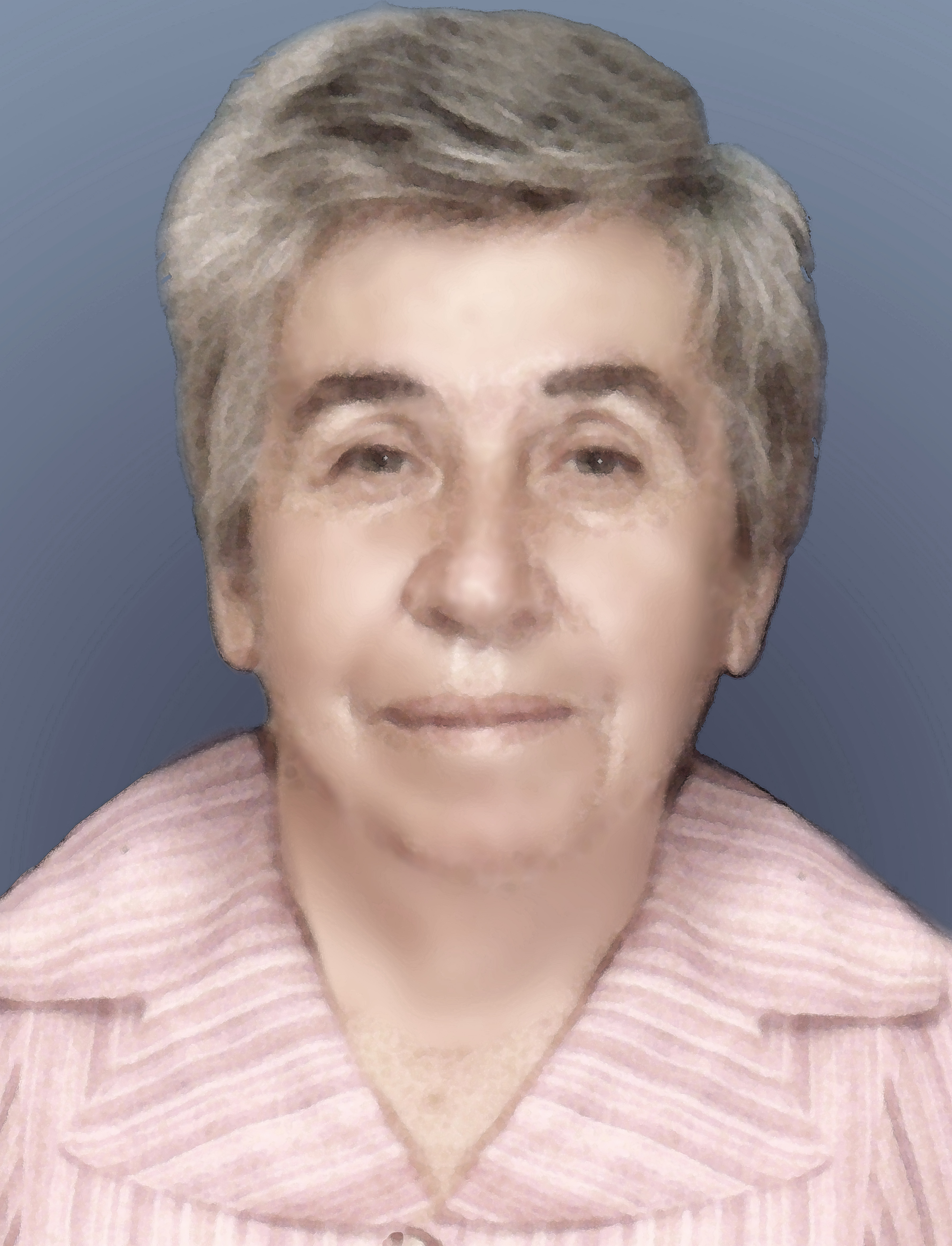
- Portrait of Klyuchko
- Born: Zoya Fedorivna Klyuchko; 20 May 1933; Pisky, Zhytomyr Raion, Zhytomyr Oblast, Ukrainian SSR, Soviet Union (now part of Stanyshivka rural hromada, Zhytomyr Raion, Zhytomyr Oblast, Ukraine
- Died: 4 June 2016 (aged 83); Kyiv, Ukraine
- Education: Taras Shevchenko National University of Kyiv
- Spouse: M.G. Klyuchko (m. 1953)
- Scientific career
- Fields: Entomology
- Workplaces: Taras Shevchenko National University of Kyiv; I. I. Schmalhausen Institute of Zoology; Pavlo Tychyna Uman State Pedagogical University

Zoya Fedorivna Klyuchko (Ukrainian: Зоя Федорівна Ключко; 20 May 1933 – 4 June 2016) was a Ukrainian entomologist, lepidopterist, zoologist, professor and doctor of biological sciences. She focused on the research of faunistics; morphology; taxonomy and phylogeny of the scoop family Noctuidae, value as pests in rural areas plants and the role in nature in rare and disappearing insects. Klyuchko worked at the Taras Shevchenko National University of Kyiv, the I. I. Schmalhausen Institute of Zoology and the Pavlo Tychyna Uman State Pedagogical University and wrote between 130 and 160 scientific articles.

== Early life and education ==
Klyuchko was born in Pisky, Zhytomyr Raion, Zhytomyr Oblast, Ukrainian SSR, Soviet Union (now part of Stanyshivka rural hromada, Zhytomyr Raion, Zhytomyr Oblast, Ukraine on 20 May 1933. She was part of the family of teachers, priests, economists, foresters, railway engineers. Klyuchko's father, Fyodor Yukhimovych Targonya, was a teacher who was in a management role, and her mother was also a teacher. She graduated with a gold medal from the No. 72 School in Kyiv in 1950. Klyuchko learned to play the piano by Olga Andriivna Korytska. In 1955, Klyuchko graduated with a diploma with honors in the specialty of biologist-zoologist from the Faculty of Biology and Soil Science of the Taras Shevchenko National University of Kyiv under the mentorship of O. P. Kryshtal.

== Career ==
From 1955 to 1958, she worked for three years of post-graduate study at the Department of Invertebrate Zoology at the Taras Shevchenko National University of Kyiv and her candidate thesis Scoves of the Western Regions of Ukraine was published in 1963. Klyuchko was senior scientific research at the laboratory of Arachnoentomology of the Taras Shevchenko National University between 1958 and 1968. She was an associate professor from 1968 to 1986 and was upgraded to professor, which she served in the role between 1986 and 1997. On 30 September 1997, Klyuchko moved to work on a contract basis as a researcher in the laboratory of zoology and ecology. She authored a second doctoral thesis, Scops of the Plusiinae subfamily of the fauna of the USSR, in 1986. Klyuchko also worked as a systems specialist in the Department of Systematics of Entomophages and Ecological Basics of Biomethods at the I. I. Schmalhausen Institute of Zoology, and was head of the Department of Biology and its Teaching Methods at the Pavlo Tychyna Uman State Pedagogical University.

At the Taras Shevchenko National University of Kyiv, Klyuchko gave students lectures on invertebrate zoology, conducted special courses on applied and general entomology, zoogeography, ecology, and nature conservation, did practical classes, as well as supervising students' course and diploma theses. She managed for more than ten years advanced training courses for teachers of biology in Schools in Kyiv and curated student courses and academic groups for the committee of the Faculty of Biology's trade union. Klyuchko was a member of the Ukrainian Entomological Society, the Societas Europaea Lepidopterologica and of the international public organization "Women in Science". She replenishes scientific and educational collections by collecting scoops in nearly every part of the Soviet Union and Ukraine. Klyuchko actively partook in national and scientific congresses and conventions on entomology in Ukraine and the European Union.

She was the author of more than 130 to 160 scientific articles, which included 12 biological science monographs. Klyuchko focused on research of faunistics; morphology; taxonomy and phylogeny of the scoop family Noctuidae, value as pests in rural areas plants and the role in nature in rare and disappearing insects. In the 1990s, she was awarded the Soros Prize for her work in science. Klyuchko authored Scoops of the quadrifinoid complex / Fauna of Ukraine in 1978, New and little-known species of scoops of the genus Autographa in 1984, Raznousye lepidoptera (Lepidoptera, Heterocera) of the Chernihiv region of Ukraine. Part 1. Scoops (Noctuidae) in 1997, Annotated catalog of scoops (Lepidoptera, Noctuidae) of the fauna of Ukraine in 2001, Scoops of Ukraine in 2006, Information and computer technologies in biology and medicine in 2008, Dynamics of the species composition and number of scoops (Lepidoptera, Noctuidae) in the Luhansk Nature Reserve (Ukraine) in 2009 and Higher variegated Lepidoptera. Part 2. Scoops (Lepidoptera: Noctuidae) in 2011.

== Personal life ==
In 1953, she married M.G. Klyuchko and the two began a family. Klyuchko died in Kyiv on 4 June 2016.
