= Umanka (river) =

Watercourse in Ukraine

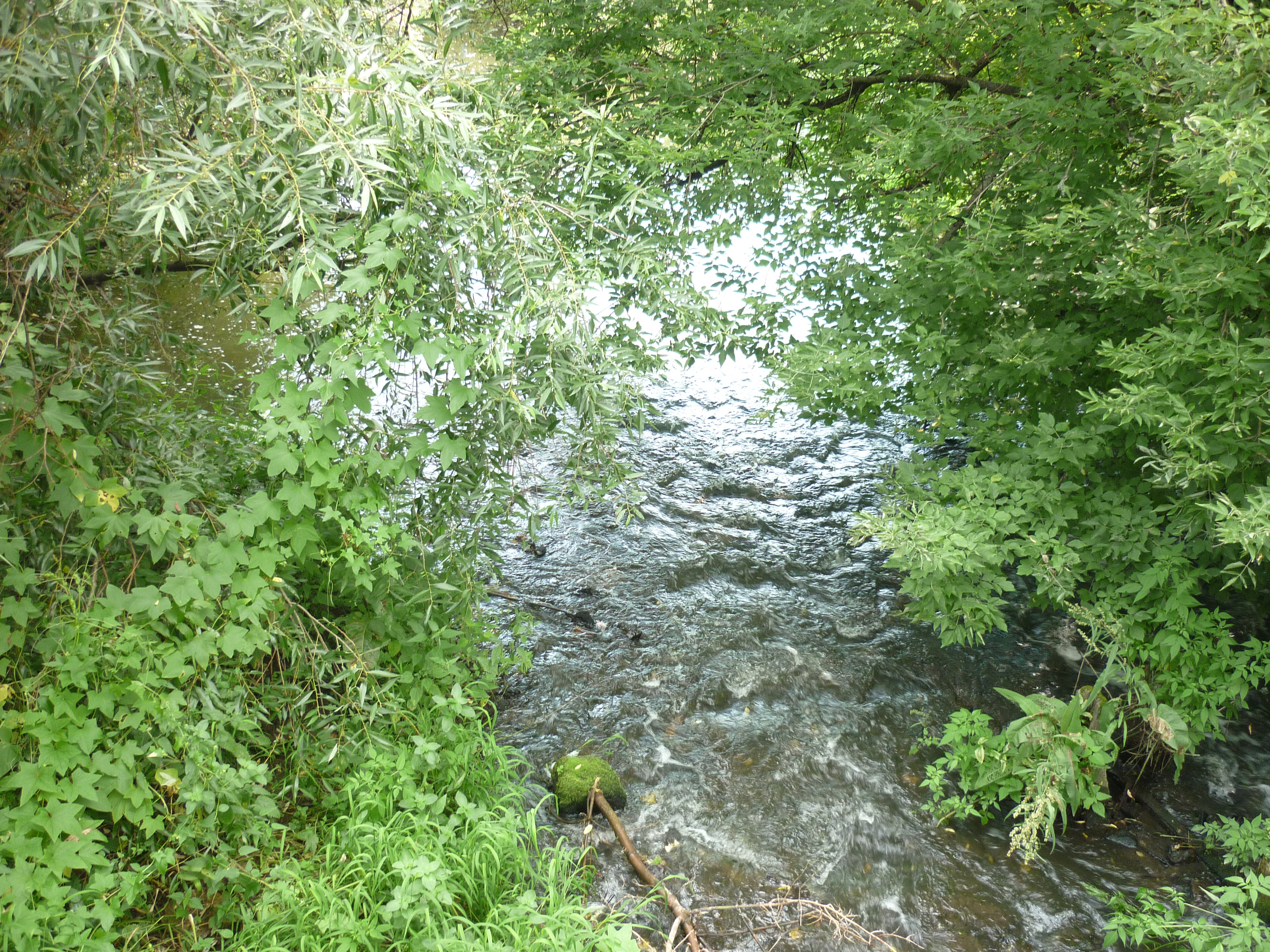

Location
- Country: Ukraine

Physical characteristics
- Mouth
  - coordinates: 48°39′25″N 30°21′57″E
- Length: 43 km (27 mi)
- Basin size: 411 km^{2} (159 sq mi)

The Umanka (Ukrainian: Уманка) is a 43-kilometre-long (27 mi) river in Cherkasy Oblast, Ukraine. It is a tributary of the Yatran River, which it enters southeast of Uman.
