= Uman urban hromada =

Urban hromada of Cherkasy Oblast, Ukraine

Uman urban hromada Уманська міська громада
- Hromada
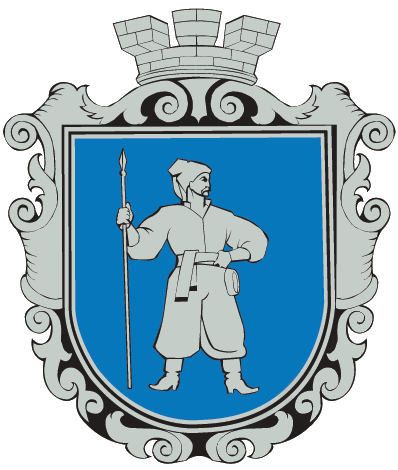
- Seal
- Interactive map of Uman urban hromada
- Country: Ukraine
- Oblast: Cherkasy
- Raion: Uman

Area
  - Total: 67.2 km^{2} (25.9 sq mi)

Population (2023)
  - Total: 87,905
  - Density: 1,310/km^{2} (3,390/sq mi)
- Settlements: 2
- Cities: 1
- Villages: 1
- Website: uman-rada.gov.ua

Uman urban territorial hromada (Ukrainian: У́манська міська територіальна громада, romanized: Umanska miska terytorialna hromada) is one of Ukraine's hromadas, located in Uman Raion within Cherkasy Oblast. Its capital is the city of Uman.

The hromada has an area of 67.2 km^{2} (25.9 mi^{2}), as well as a population of 87,905 (as of 2023).

== Composition ==
In addition to one city (Uman), the hromada contains the village of Polianetske.
