= Uman =

City in Cherkasy Oblast, Ukraine

Uman Умань
- City
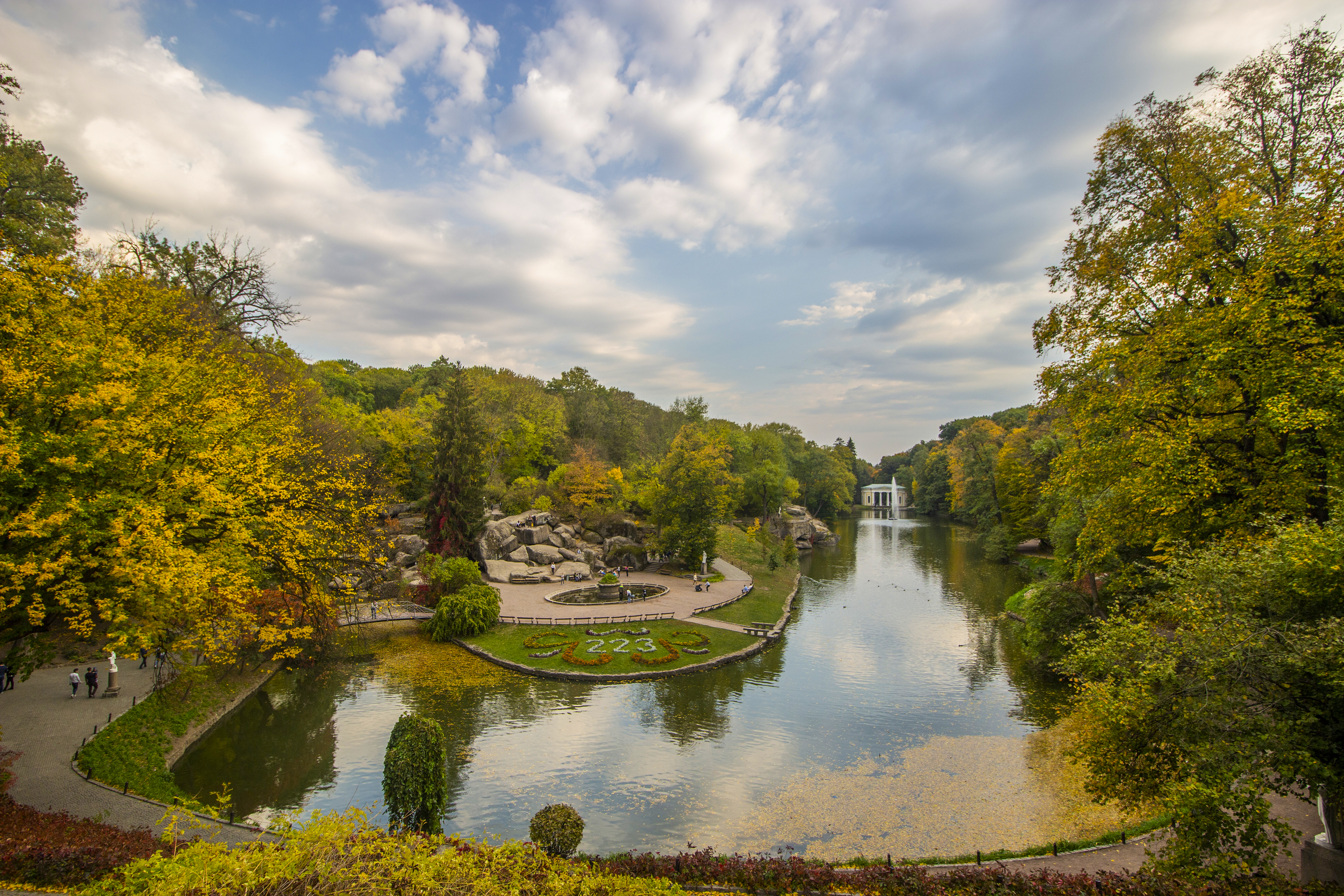
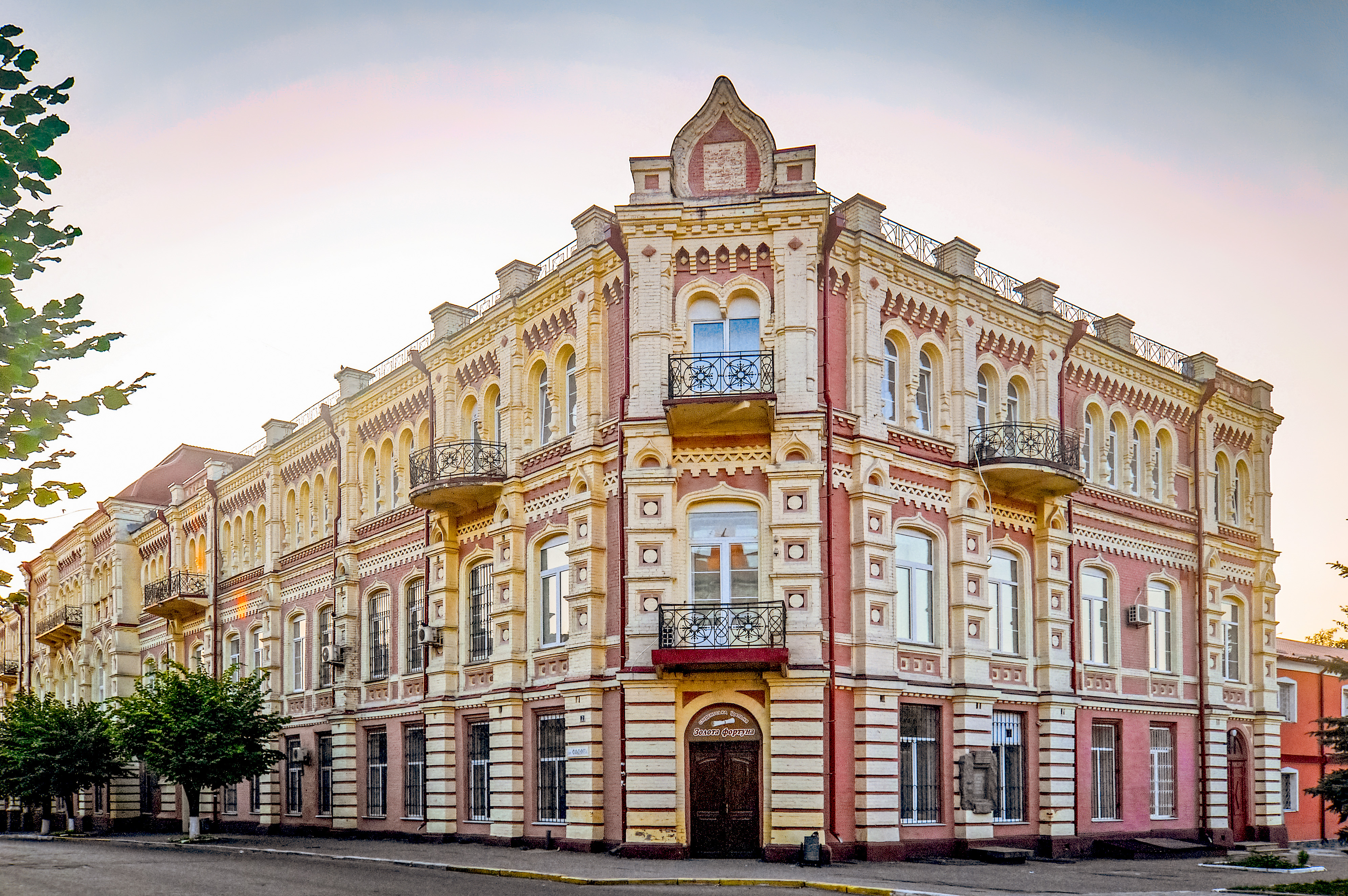
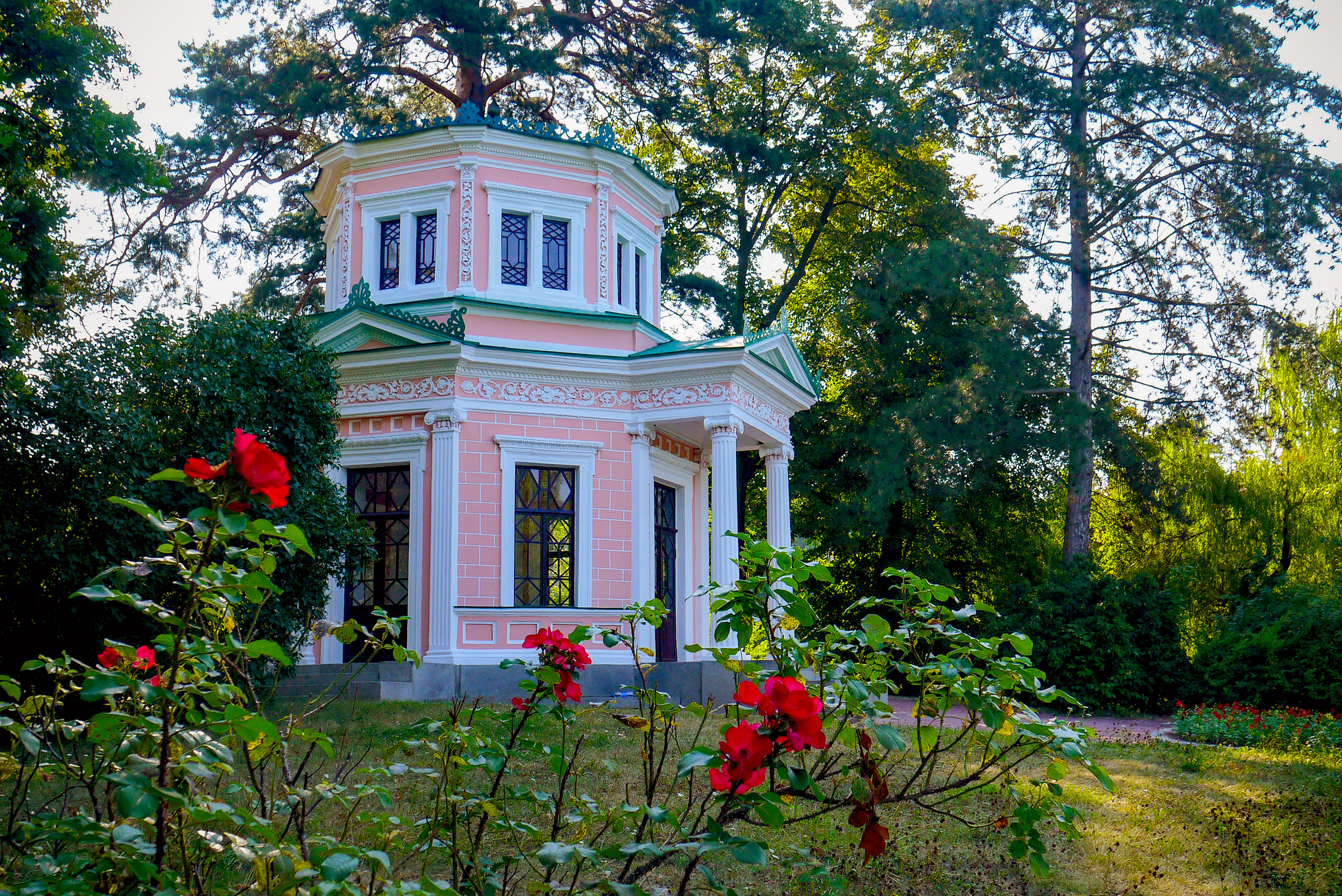
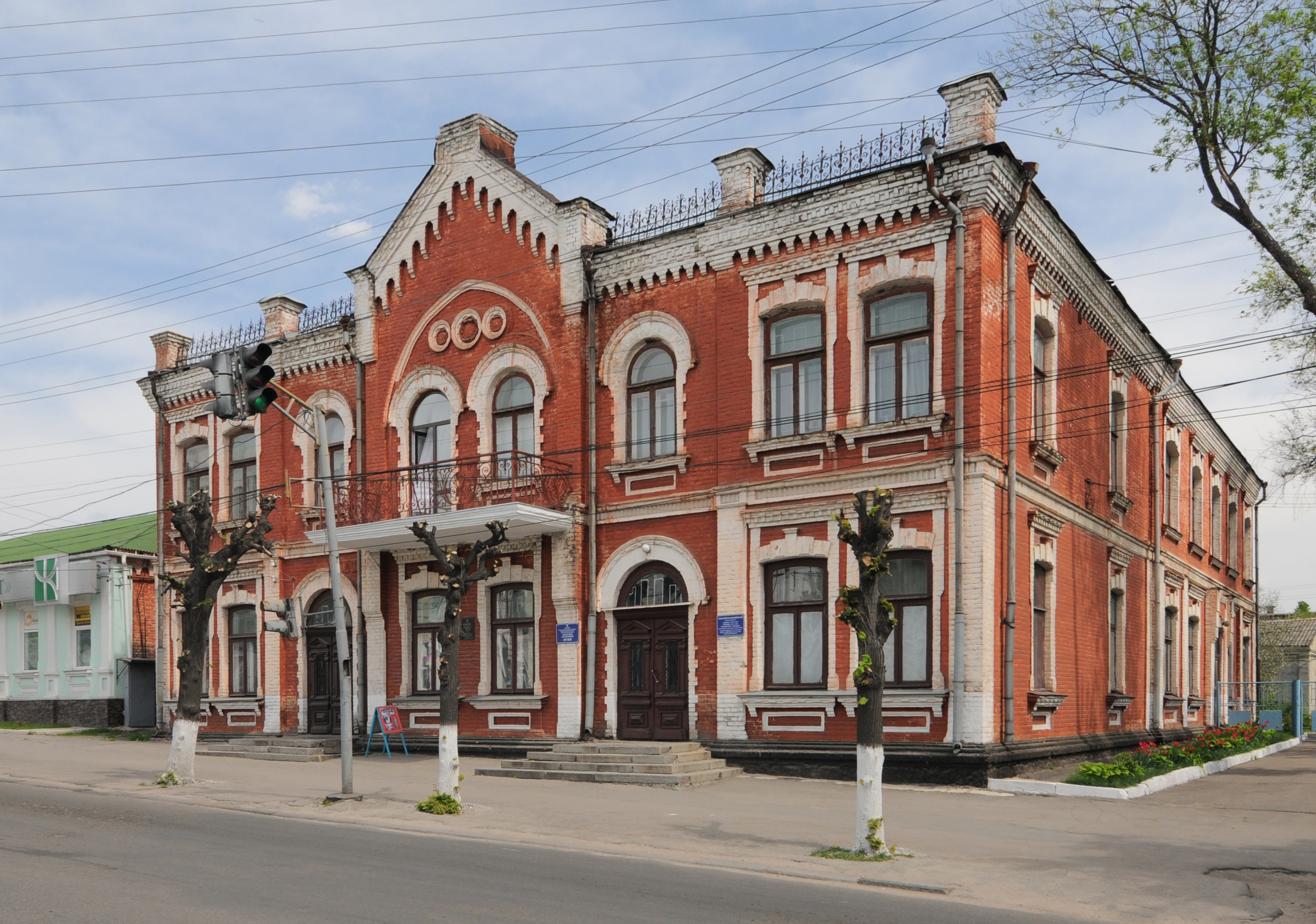
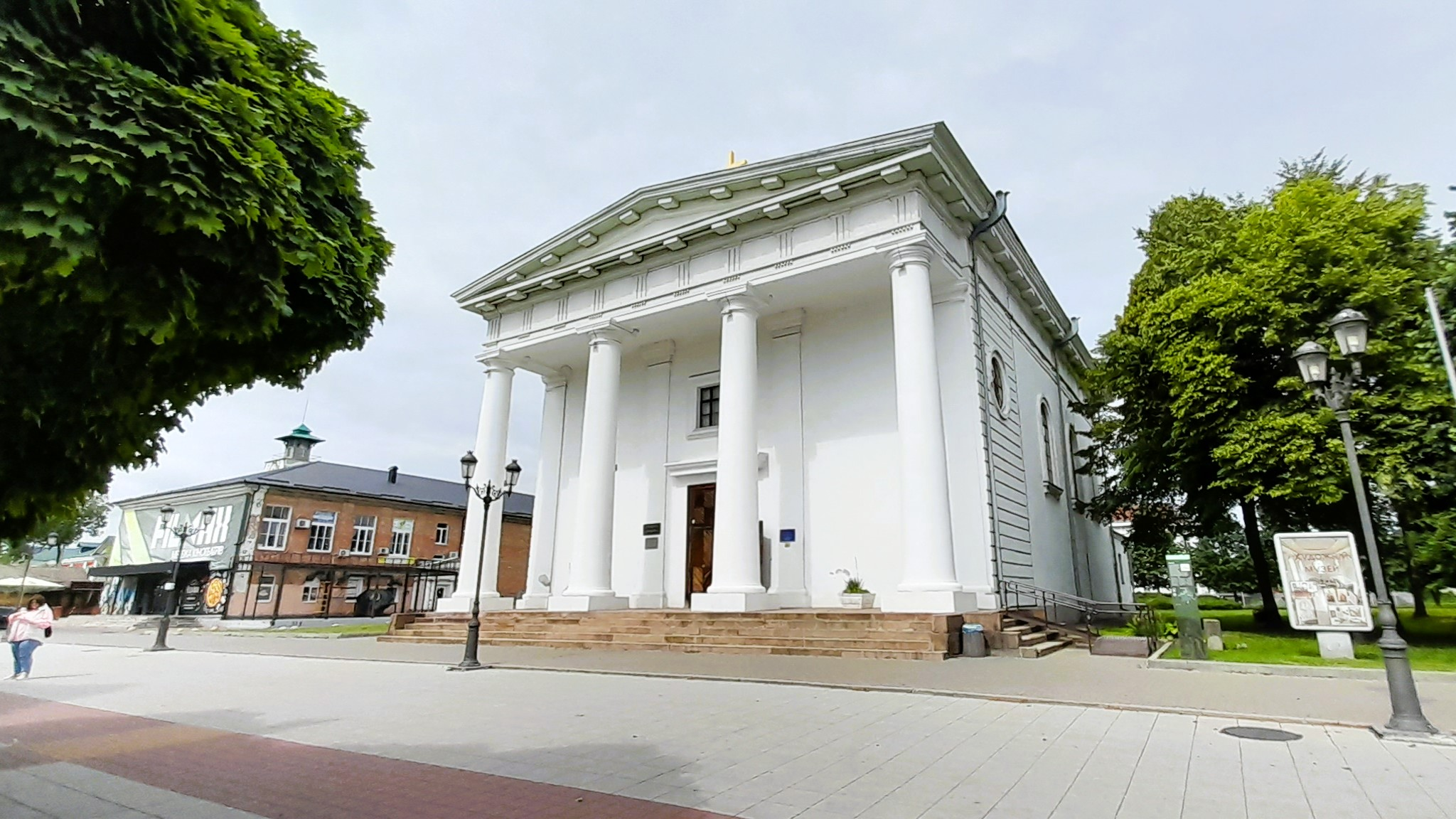
- Sofiyivka Park Pedagogical University Pink Pavillion Local museum Church of the Assumption of Mary

- Flag Coat of arms
- Interactive map of Uman
- Location of Uman Uman (Ukraine)
- Coordinates: 48°45′0″N 30°13′0″E
- Country: Ukraine
- Oblast: Cherkasy Oblast
- Raion: Uman Raion
- Hromada: Uman urban hromada
- First mentioned: 1616
- Magdeburg rights: 1760

Government
  - Mayor: Iryna Pletniova

Area
  - Total: 41 km^{2} (16 sq mi)
- Elevation: 166 m (545 ft)

Population (2022)
  - Total: 81,525
  - Density: 2,000/km^{2} (5,100/sq mi)
- Postal code: 20300
- Area code: +380 4744
- KATOTTH: UA71060210010010251
- Website: https://uman-rada.gov.ua/

Uman (Ukrainian: Умань, IPA: [ˈumɐnʲ], locally: Гумань, IPA: [ˈɦumɐnʲ]; Polish: Humań; Yiddish: אומאַן) is a city in Cherkasy Oblast, central Ukraine. It is located to the east of Vinnytsia. Located in the east of the historical region of Podolia, the city rests on the banks of the Umanka River. Uman serves as the administrative center of Uman Raion (district). It hosts the administration of Uman urban hromada, one of the hromadas of Ukraine. Population: 81,525 (2022 estimate).

Among Ukrainians, Uman is known for its mention in Taras Shevchenko's longest poem, Haidamaky ("The Haidamaks", 1841). The city is also a pilgrimage site for Breslov Hasidic Jews and a major center of gardening research containing the dendrological park Sofiyivka and the University of Gardening.

== History ==
=== Polish rule ===
Uman was first mentioned in historical documents in 1616, when it was under Polish rule. It was a privately owned city of the Polish–Lithuanian Commonwealth, part of the Bracław Voivodeship of the Lesser Poland Province. Its role at this time was as a defensive fort to withstand Tatar raids, containing a prominent Cossack regiment that was stationed within the town. In 1648 it was taken from the Poles by Ivan Hanzha, colonel to Cossack leader Bohdan Khmelnytsky, and Uman was converted to the administrative center of the Cossack regiment in the region.

Poland retook Uman in 1667, after which the town was deserted by many of its residents who fled eastward to Left-bank Ukraine. From 1670–1674, Uman was the residence of the Hetman of right-bank Ukraine.. It was part of Ottoman Empire between 1672 and 1699.

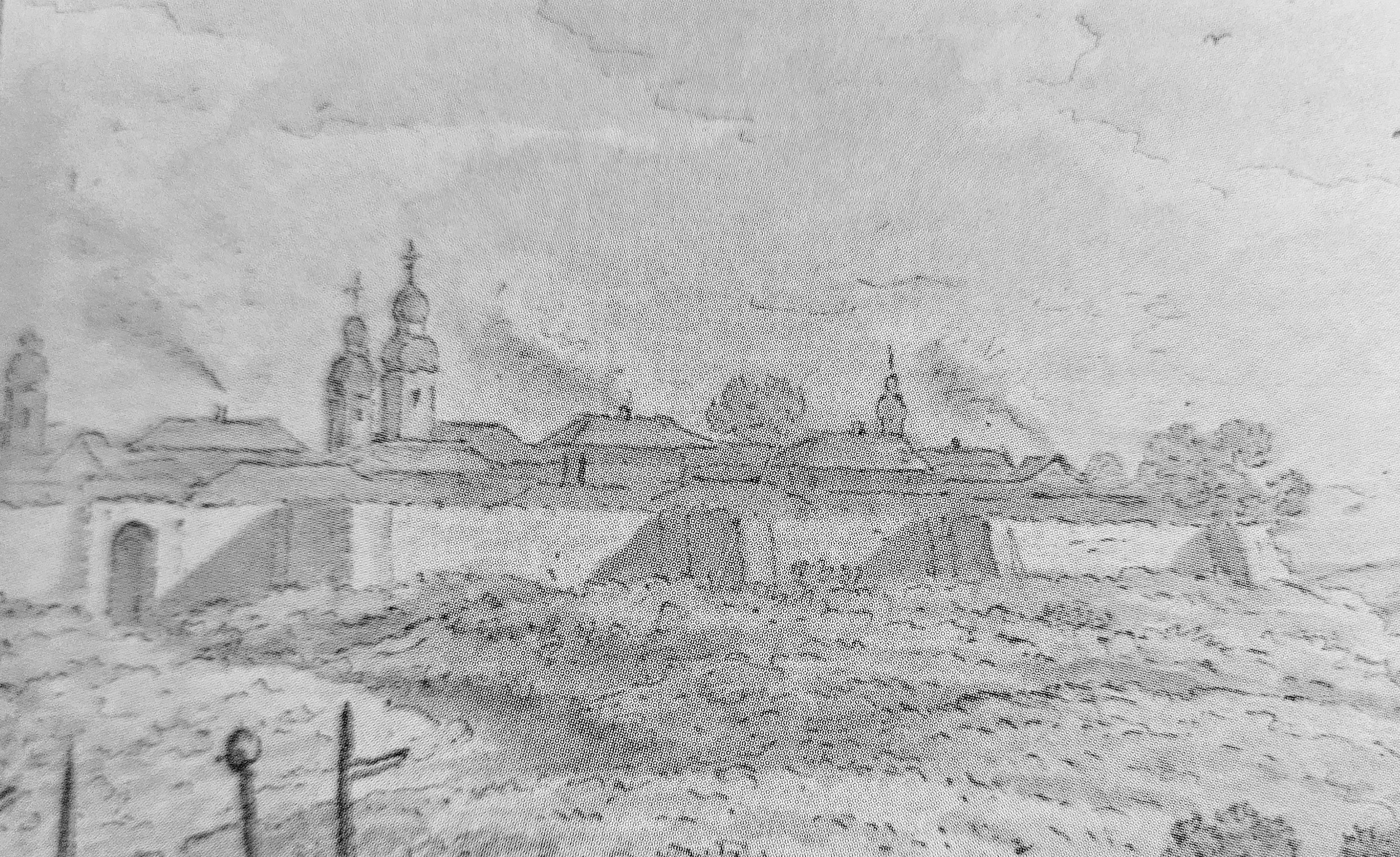
18th-century view of Humań

Under the ownership of the Potocki family of Polish nobles (1726–1832) Uman grew in economic and cultural importance. A Basilian monastery and school were established at this time.

The Uman region was the site of haidamaky uprisings in 1734, 1750, and 1768. Notably during the latter, Cossack rebels Maksym Zalizniak and Ivan Gonta captured Uman during the Koliyivshchyna uprising against Polish rule. During this revolt, a massacre took place against Jews, Poles and Ukrainian Uniates. On the very first day large numbers of Ukrainians deserted the ranks of Polish forces and joined the rebels when the city was surrounded. Thousands from the surrounding areas fled to the Cossack garrison in Uman for protection. The military commander of Uman, Mladanovich, betrayed the city's Jews and allowed the pursuing Cossacks in, in exchange for clemency towards the Polish population. In the span of three days an estimated 20,000 Poles and Jews were slain with extreme cruelty, according to numerous Polish sources, with one source giving an estimate of 2,000 casualties.

The Polish 8th National Cavalry Brigade was garrisoned in the city in 1790.

=== 19th and 20th centuries ===
==== Russian rule ====
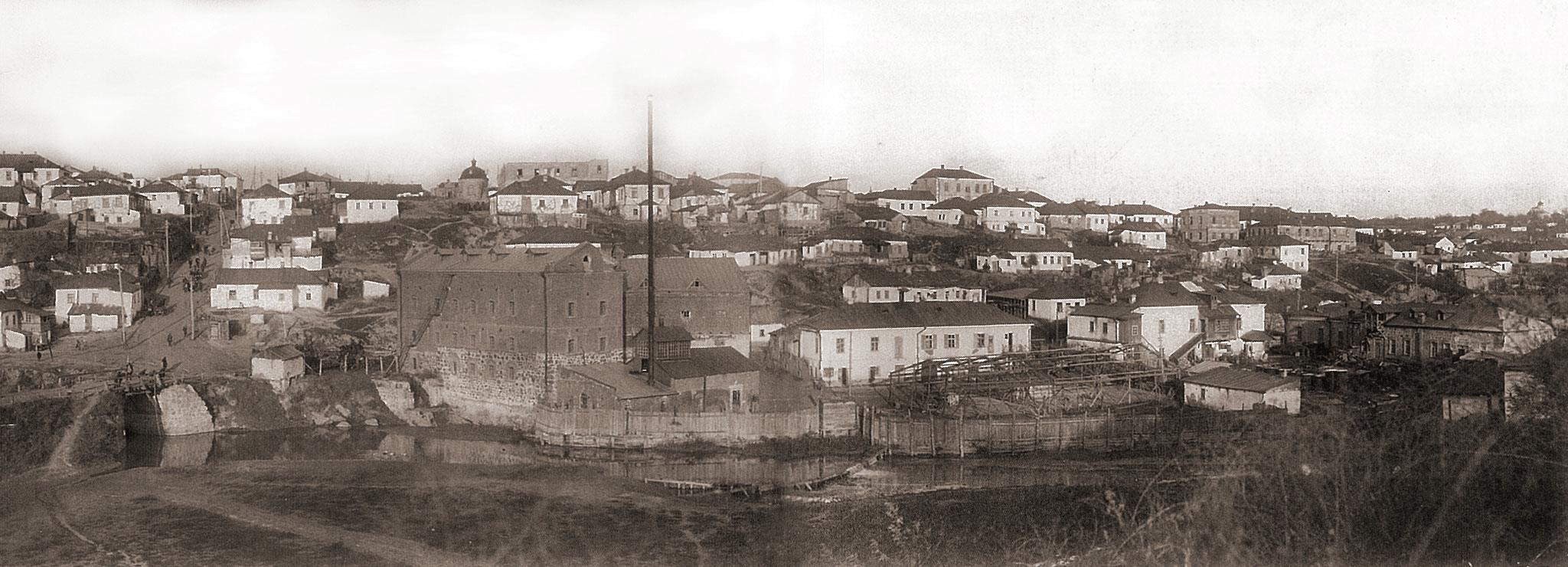
Early-20th-century panorama

With the 1793 Second Partition of Poland, Uman became part of the Russian Empire and a number of aristocratic residences were built there. In 1795, Uman became a povit/uezd center in Voznesensk Governorate, and in 1797, in Kyiv Governorate.

Into the 20th century, Uman was linked by rail to Kyiv and Odesa, leading to the rapid development of its industrial sector. Its population grew from 10,100 in 1860 to 29,900 in 1900 and over 50,000 in 1914. According to the Russian census of 1897, Uman with a population of 31,016 was the second largest city of Podolia after Kamianets-Podilskyi.

==== Ukrainian rule ====
On 6 March 1918, Uman became the seat of Pobozhzhya, a newly established zemlia of the Ukrainian People's Republic, which was disbanded on 29 April 1918 by Hetman of Ukraine Pavlo Skoropadsky, who brought back old governorate divisions of the Russian Empire. After 1920, it was located in the Kyiv Governorate of Ukraine.

==== Soviet rule ====
In 1941, the Battle of Uman took place in the vicinity of the town, where the German army encircled Soviet positions. Adolf Hitler and Benito Mussolini visited Uman in 1941. Uman was occupied by German forces from 1 August 1941, to 10 March 1944. The Germans operated the AGSSt 16 assembly center for prisoners of war in 1941, and the Stalag 349 POW camp from September 1941 to October 1943.

=== Independent Ukraine ===
As of 2011, the city has optical and farm-machinery plants, a cannery, a brewery, a vitamin factory, a sewing factory, a footwear factory, and other industrial enterprises.

Until 18 July 2020, Uman was designated as a city of oblast significance and did not belong to Uman Raion even though it was the center of the raion. As part of the administrative reform of Ukraine, which reduced the number of raions of Cherkasy Oblast to four, the city was merged into Uman Raion.

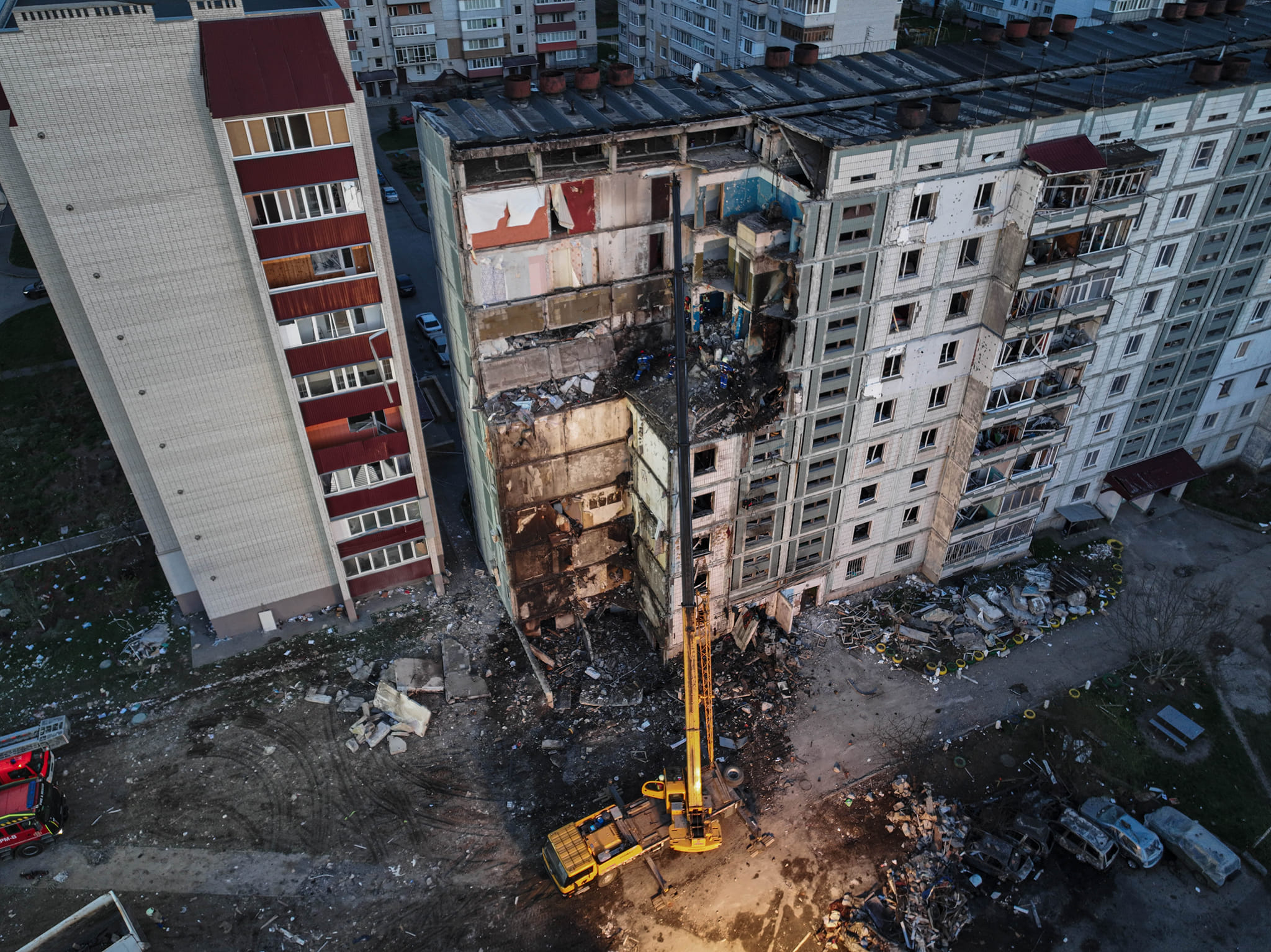
Apartment building after a Russian missile strike, April 2023

During the Russian invasion of Ukraine, Uman was hit by Russian artillery on 24 February 2022, which led to the death of a cyclist. The incident was caught on camera. Another Russian missile strike on 28 April 2023 hit a residential building in the city, killing at least 23 people including 6 children and injuring dozens more. The airstrike was quickly followed by a Telegram post by the Russian Ministry of Defense of an image of a missile launch with the caption "right on target".

== Demographics ==
Historical population
Year	Pop.	±%
1897	31,016	—
1926	43,821	+41.3%
1939	44,384	+1.3%
1959	44,546	+0.4%
1970	63,378	+42.3%
1979	78,897	+24.5%
1989	90,596	+14.8%
2001	88,735	−2.1%
2011	87,437	−1.5%
2022	81,525	−6.8%

=== Ethnic groups ===
Distribution of the population by ethnicity according to the 2001 census:

Ethnic groups in Uman
	percent
Ukrainians	92.69%
Russians	6.10%
Belarusians	0.23%
Jews	0.21%
Poles	0.10%
Armenians	0.10%
Moldovans	0.08%
others	0.49%

=== Language ===
Distribution of the population by native language according to the 2001 census:

Language	Number	Percentage
Ukrainian	81 933	93.27%
Russian	5 600	6.38%
Other^{[a]}	310	0.35%
Total	87 843	100.00%

^{a} Those who did not indicate their native language or indicated a language that was native to less than 1% of the local population.

=== Economy ===
The city possesses some 21 large and 450 small businesses among which agricultural, pharmaceuticals, food and spirits companies.

=== Jewish community ===
A large Jewish community lived in Uman in the 18th and 19th centuries. During the Second World War, in 1941, the Battle of Uman took place in the vicinity of the town, during which the German army encircled Soviet positions. The Germans deported the entire Jewish community, murdering around 17,000 Jews, and completely destroyed the Jewish cemetery—the burial place of the victims of the 1768 uprising and Rebbe Nachman of Breslov. After the war, a Breslov Hasid managed to locate the Rebbe's grave and preserved it when the Soviets turned the entire area into a housing project. Since the 1990s, a small but growing Jewish population has been concentrated around the tomb of Rebbe Nachman of Breslov on Pushkina Street. The local Jews are mostly involved in serving Jewish tourists who arrive in the town. In 2018, the community saw significant growth, with about 10–20 families from Israel, accompanied by a small movement of young American couples. Newcomers to the city are concentrating around Skhidna Street, with some toward the Nova Uman area. In conjunction with the community's growth, a new Yiddish-language school was established.

==== Jewish cemetery ====
The Jewish cemetery in Uman served as the burial site for local Jews, including victims of the 1768 Haidamak uprising and Rebbe Nachman of Breslov, a prominent Hasidic leader and founder of the Breslov Hasidic dynasty. The cemetery was destroyed by Nazi forces during World War II, and much of the site was later redeveloped into residential and urban infrastructure during the Soviet era. Despite extensive construction in the area, the grave of Rebbe Nachman of Breslov was preserved by members of the Breslov Hasidic community, particularly through efforts led by Reb Michel Dorfman, who organized discreet visits and obtained Soviet assurances to protect the site during development.

Following the collapse of the Soviet Union, unauthorized construction continued on the former cemetery grounds, including residential and commercial developments, often without full archaeological or religious consideration. Efforts to halt further construction and to mark or preserve the cemetery have faced legal and political challenges. In 1994, a presidential decree designated the area surrounding Rebbe Nachman’s grave as a Historical and Cultural Center, prohibiting new construction. This designation was reaffirmed in 1995 by the Cherkasy Regional Council, which recognized the cemetery as a cultural monument. Despite these protections, illegal construction has continued since the 1990s. In 2024, the Uman City Council adopted a plan that significantly reduced the protected zone, raising concerns over the site’s vulnerability to further encroachment.

International Jewish organizations and other advocacy groups have called for preservation and partial restoration of the site, but enforcement has been inconsistent, and some new buildings remain atop known burial areas. The United States government has also expressed concern. The U.S. Commission for the Preservation of America's Heritage Abroad, a federal agency responsible for protecting cultural sites related to the heritage of U.S. citizens, has approved a project to erect a monument on the cemetery grounds to help protect it from further desecration. The Historical and Cultural Center of Uman, established in 2022 with the participation of Hasidic community members and heritage experts, also works to preserve the site and promote awareness of its historical significance.

=== Pilgrimage to Rebbe Nachman's grave ===
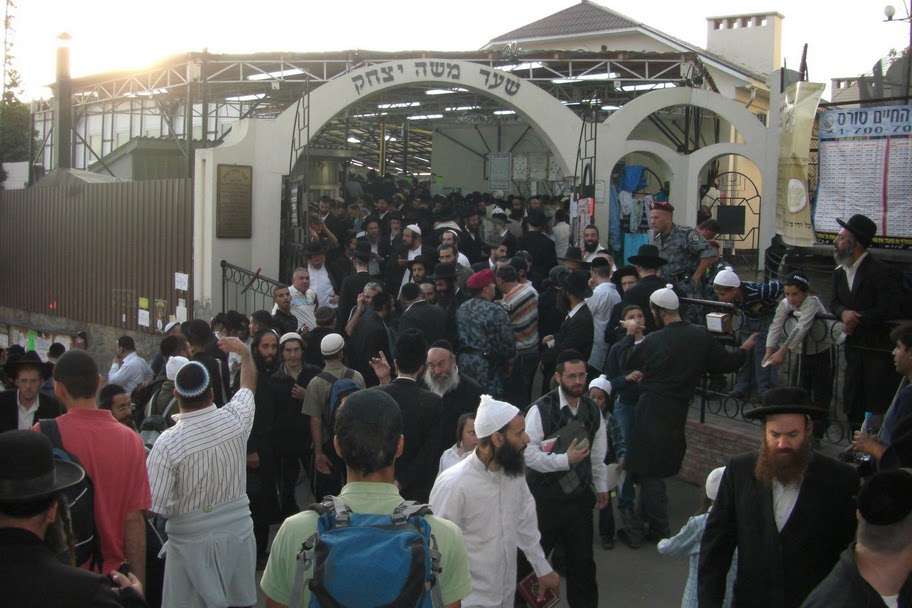
The tomb of Nachman of Breslov

Every Rosh Hashana, there is a major pilgrimage by tens of thousands of Hasidim and others from around the world to the burial site of Rebbe Nachman of Breslov, located on the former site of the Jewish cemetery in a rebuilt synagogue. Rebbe Nachman Me'Uman spent the last five months of his life in Uman, and specifically requested to be buried there. As believed by the Breslov Hasidim, before his death he solemnly promised to intercede on behalf of anyone who would come to pray on his grave on Rosh Hashana, "be he the worst of sinners"; thus, a pilgrimage to this grave provides the best chance of getting unscathed through the stern judgement which, according to Jewish faith, God passes everybody on Yom Kippur.

The Rosh Hashana pilgrimage dates back to 1811, when the Rebbe's foremost disciple, Nathan of Breslov, organized the first such pilgrimage on the Rosh Hashana after the Rebbe's death. The annual pilgrimage attracted hundreds of Hasidic Jews from Ukraine, Belarus, Lithuania and Poland throughout the 19th and early 20th centuries, until the Bolshevik Revolution of 1917 sealed the border between Soviet Russia (later the Ukrainian SSR within the Soviet Union) and Poland. A handful of Soviet Hasidic Jews continued to make the pilgrimage clandestinely; some were discovered by the KGB and exiled to Siberia, where they died.

The pilgrimage ceased during World War II and resumed on a drastically smaller scale in 1948. From the 1960s until end of the Cold War in 1989, several hundred American and Israeli Hasidic Jews made their way to Uman, both legally and illegally, to pray at the grave of Rebbe Nachman. In 1988, the Soviets allowed 250 men to visit the Rebbe's grave for Rosh Hashana. In 1989, over 1,000 Hasidic Jews gathered in Uman for Rosh Hashana 1989. In 1990, 2,000 attended. In 2008, attendance reached 25,000 men and boys. In 2018, over 30,000 Jews made the Rosh Hashanah pilgrimage to Uman.

In the mid-2010s, Israelis from many sectors of Israel's Ultra-Orthodox community, including many Mizrahi Jewish rabbis, make the pilgrimage. The event brings together a wide variety of Orthodox society, from Yemenite yeshiva students, to former Israeli prison inmates, and American hippies. In 2022, following the Russian invasion of Ukraine, the number of pilgrims coming to Uman for Jewish New Year was approximately 10,000, or about one-third of the number in 2021.

The annual pilgrimage is regarded as Uman's main economic industry.

== Sights ==
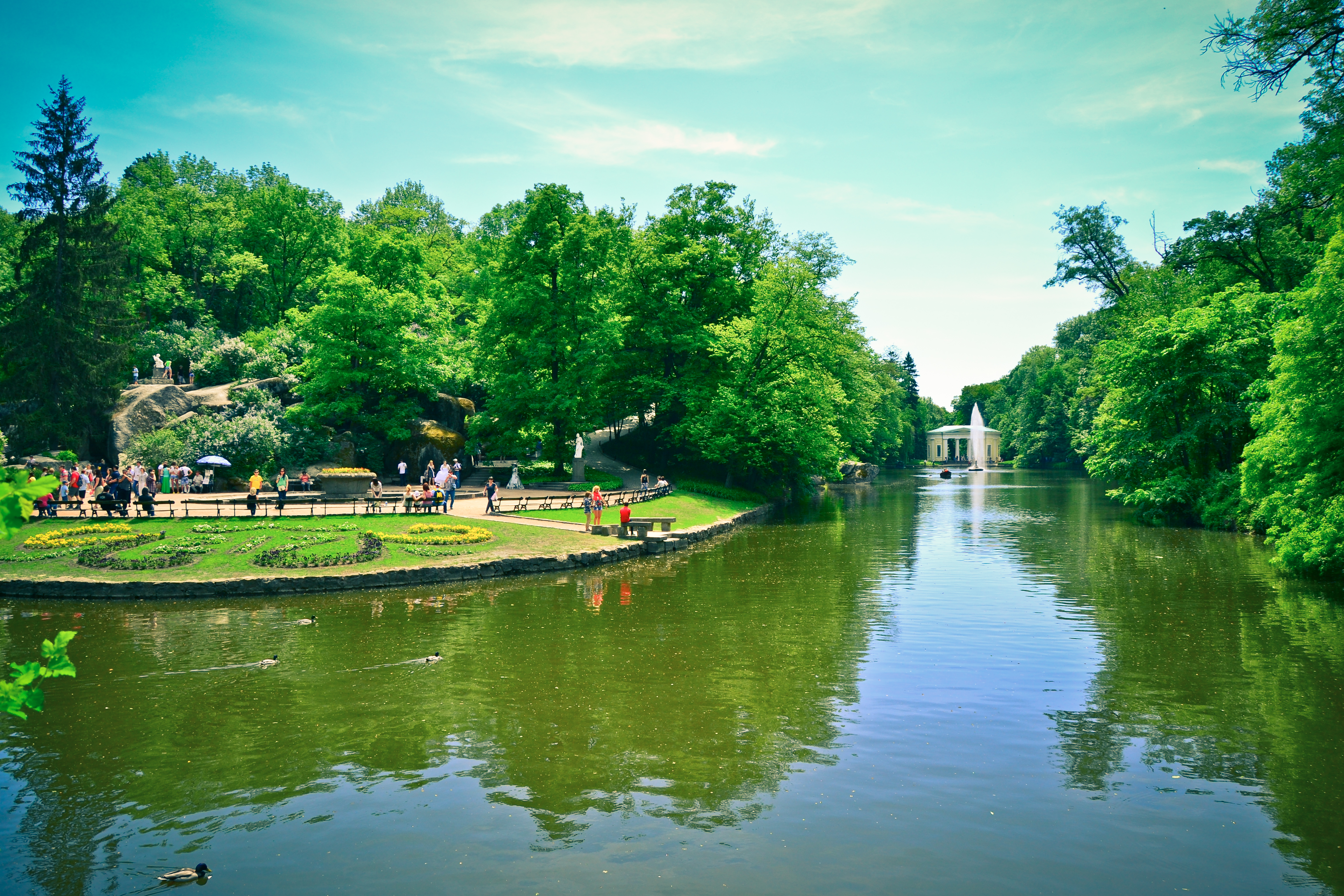
Sofiyivka Park in Uman

Uman's landmark is a famous park complex, Sofiyivka (Ukrainian: Софiївка; Polish: Zofiówka), founded in 1796 by Count Stanisław Szczęsny Potocki, a Polish noble, who named it for his wife Zofia. The park features a number of waterfalls and narrow, arching stone bridges crossing the streams and scenic ravines.

The main architectural monuments are the catacombs of the old fortress, the Basilian monastery (1764), the city hall (1780–1782), the Dormition Roman Catholic church in the Classicist style (1826), and 19th-century trading stalls.

== Geography ==
=== Climate ===
Climate data for Uman (1991–2020)
Month	Jan	Feb	Mar	Apr	May	Jun	Jul	Aug	Sep	Oct	Nov	Dec	Year
Record high °C (°F)	12.2 (54.0)	18.3 (64.9)	23.6 (74.5)	28.8 (83.8)	34.3 (93.7)	35.0 (95.0)	38.9 (102.0)	37.3 (99.1)	32.8 (91.0)	28.1 (82.6)	21.2 (70.2)	15.8 (60.4)	38.9 (102.0)
Mean daily maximum °C (°F)	−0.9 (30.4)	0.9 (33.6)	6.9 (44.4)	15.4 (59.7)	21.5 (70.7)	24.9 (76.8)	26.8 (80.2)	26.5 (79.7)	20.6 (69.1)	13.4 (56.1)	5.8 (42.4)	0.6 (33.1)	13.6 (56.5)
Daily mean °C (°F)	−3.4 (25.9)	−2.3 (27.9)	2.5 (36.5)	9.7 (49.5)	15.4 (59.7)	19.0 (66.2)	20.9 (69.6)	20.1 (68.2)	14.5 (58.1)	8.3 (46.9)	2.8 (37.0)	−1.8 (28.8)	8.8 (47.8)
Mean daily minimum °C (°F)	−5.9 (21.4)	−5.0 (23.0)	−1.4 (29.5)	4.2 (39.6)	9.3 (48.7)	13.2 (55.8)	15.0 (59.0)	14.3 (57.7)	9.2 (48.6)	4.1 (39.4)	0.1 (32.2)	−4.3 (24.3)	4.4 (39.9)
Record low °C (°F)	−32.2 (−26.0)	−30.0 (−22.0)	−23.8 (−10.8)	−11.1 (12.0)	−3.4 (25.9)	0.0 (32.0)	6.0 (42.8)	2.0 (35.6)	−6.0 (21.2)	−10.0 (14.0)	−20.0 (−4.0)	−27.2 (−17.0)	−32.2 (−26.0)
Average precipitation mm (inches)	38 (1.5)	34 (1.3)	36 (1.4)	41 (1.6)	52 (2.0)	81 (3.2)	68 (2.7)	49 (1.9)	61 (2.4)	43 (1.7)	43 (1.7)	40 (1.6)	586 (23.1)
Average precipitation days (≥ 1.0 mm)	7.6	6.7	7.8	6.9	8.3	8.4	7.8	5.8	6.7	5.8	6.3	7.6	85.7
Average relative humidity (%)	84.9	81.6	74.5	64.4	65.9	69.1	69.2	66.9	73.2	79.3	85.3	86.8	75.1
Source 1: World Meteorological Organization
Source 2: Climatebase.ru (extremes)

== Science and education ==
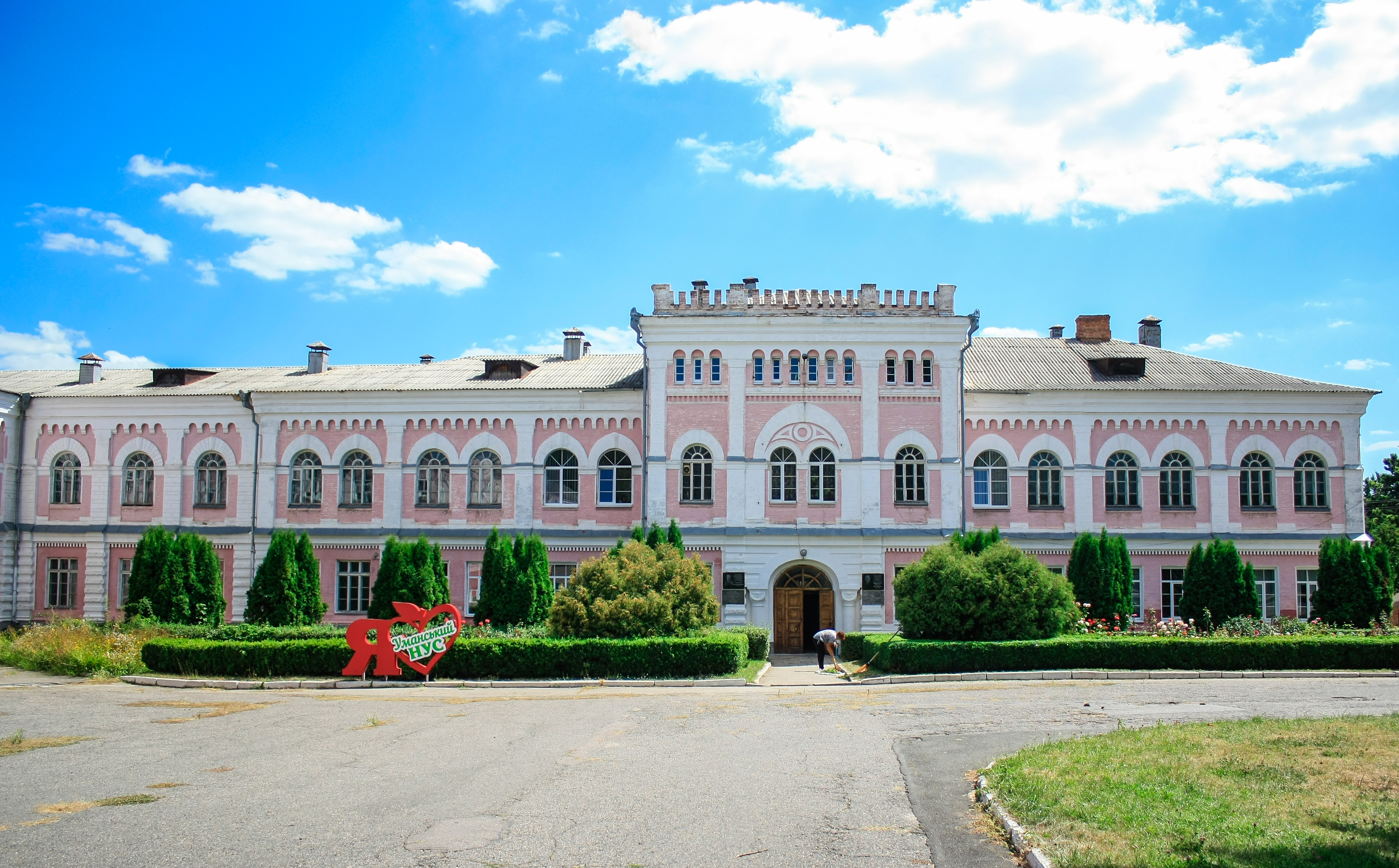
Uman University

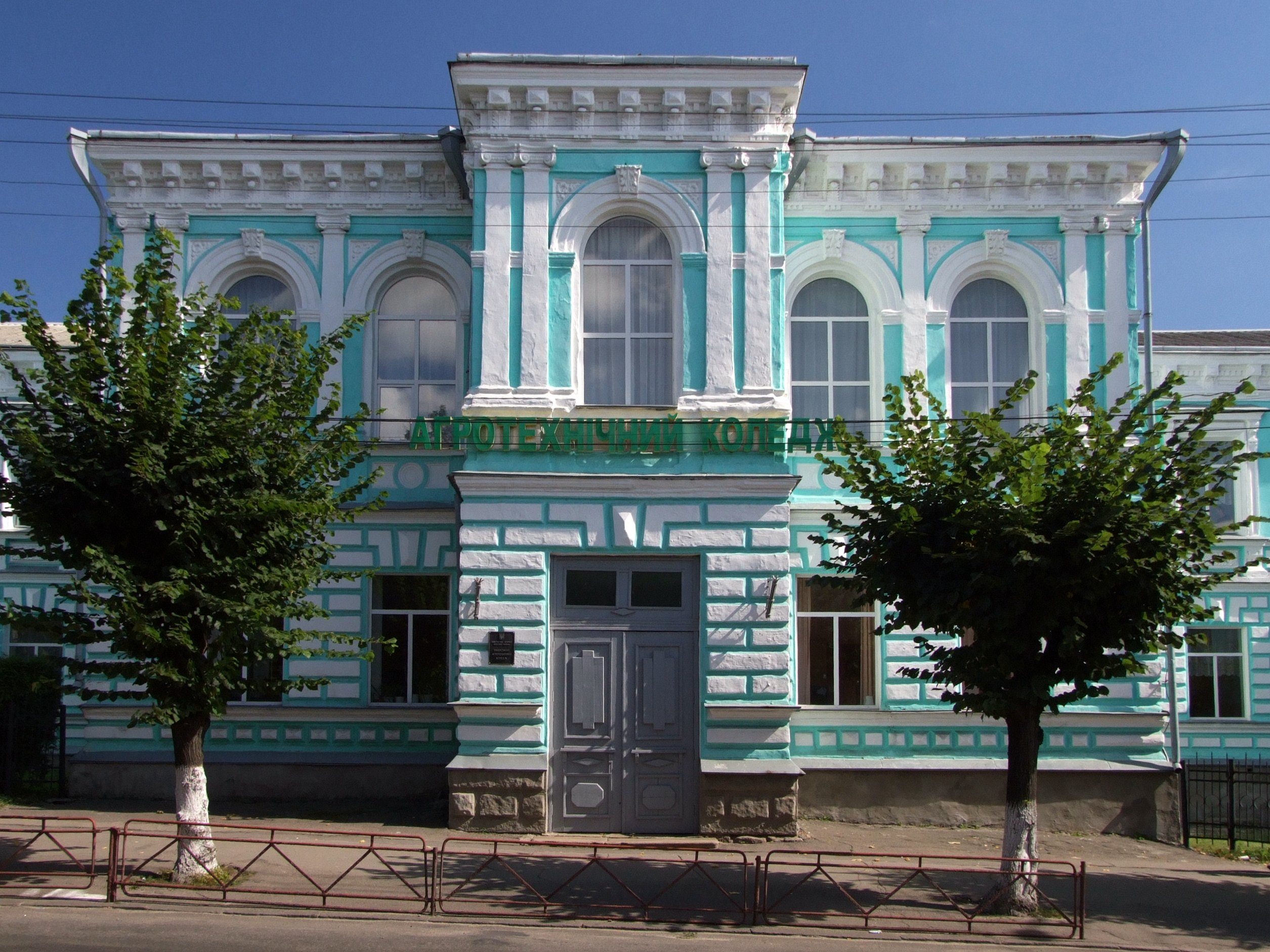
Agrotechnical College

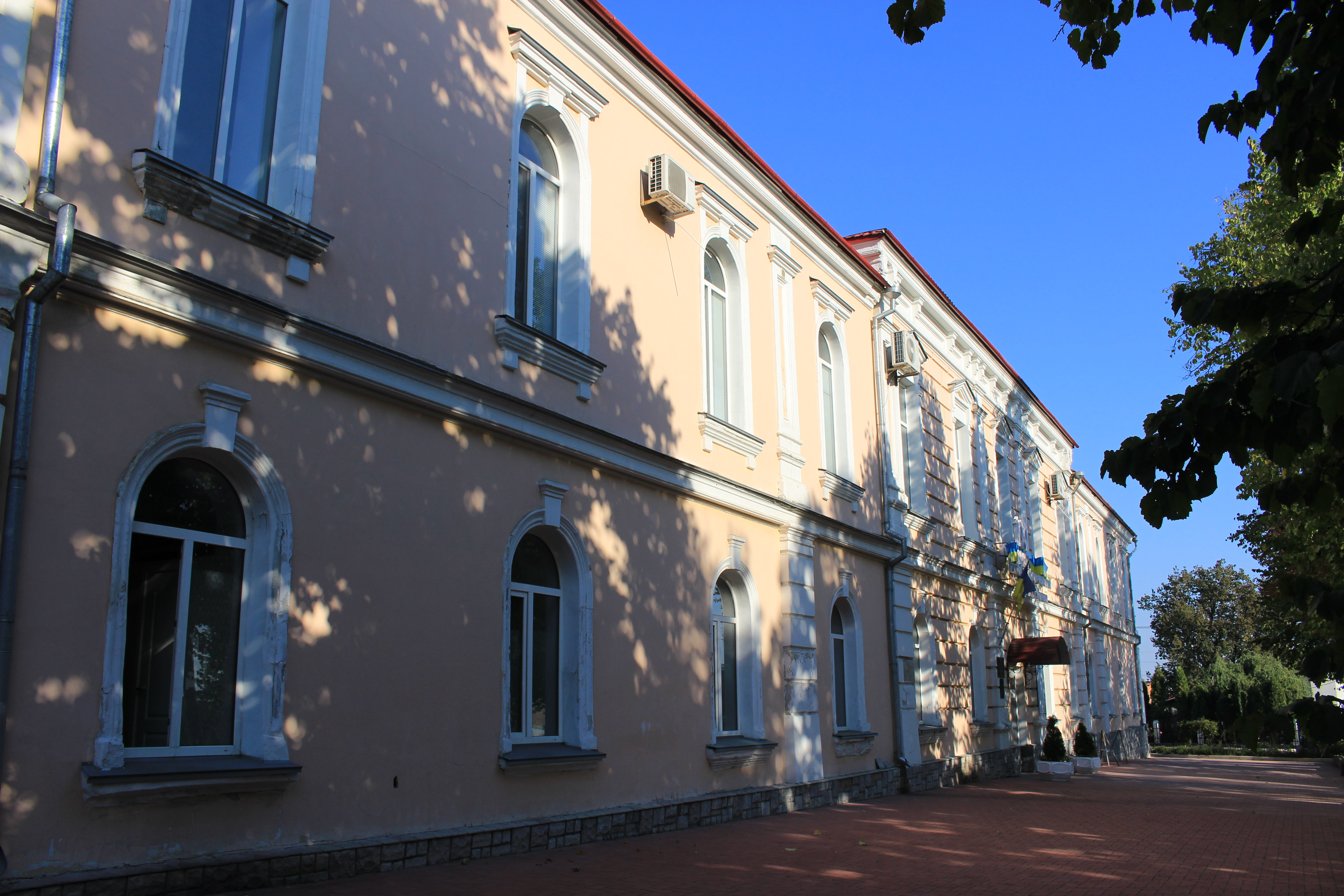
Humanitarian and Pedagogical College

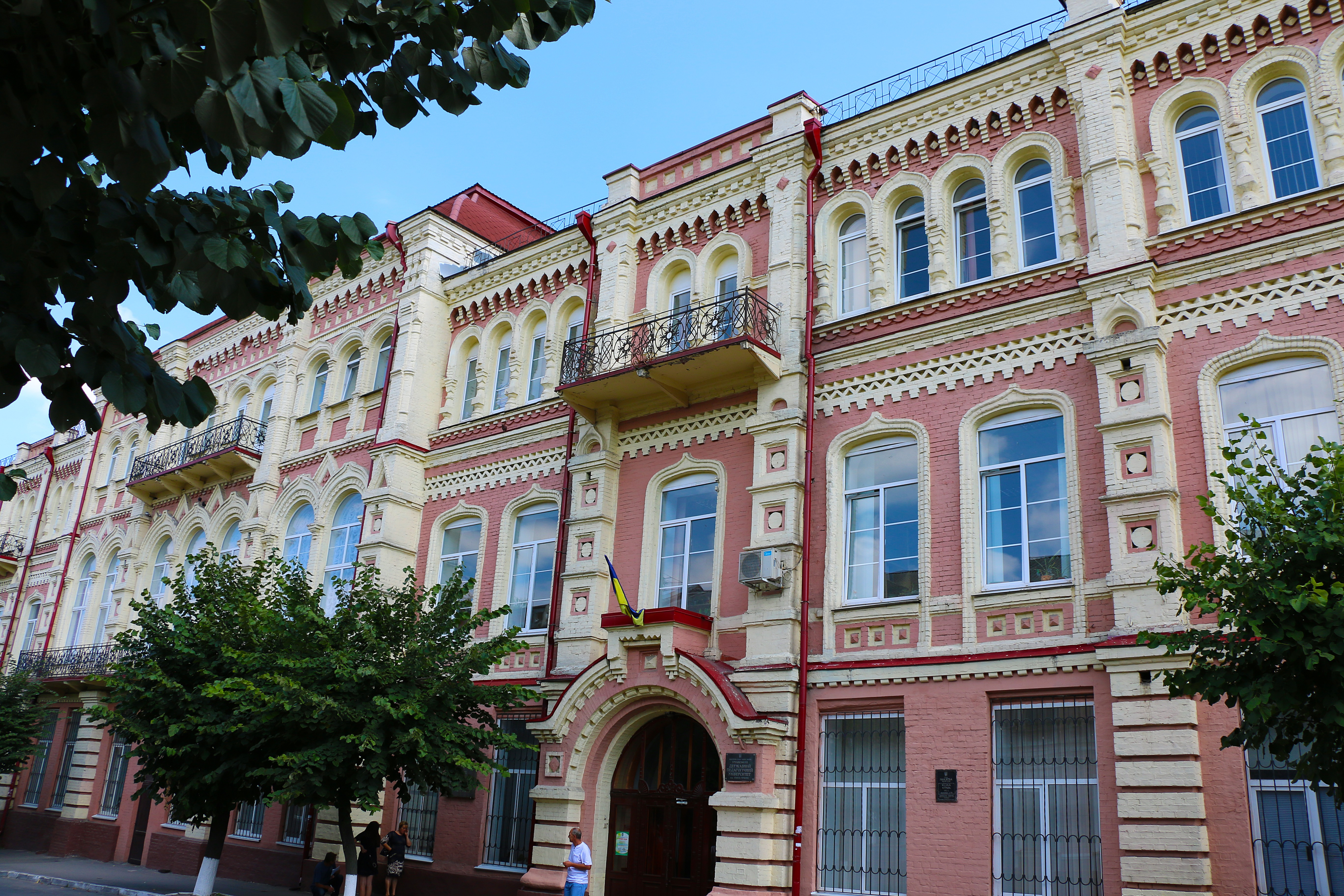
State Pedagogical University

Universities:

- Pavlo Tychyna Uman State Pedagogical University
- University of Gardening
- European University (Uman campus)

Institutes and colleges:

- Agrarian and Technical College
- Demutsky Music College
- Medical College
- Shevchenko Humanitarian and Pedagogical College

Academy of Sciences (research institutes):

- Sofiyivsky Park

== Sports ==
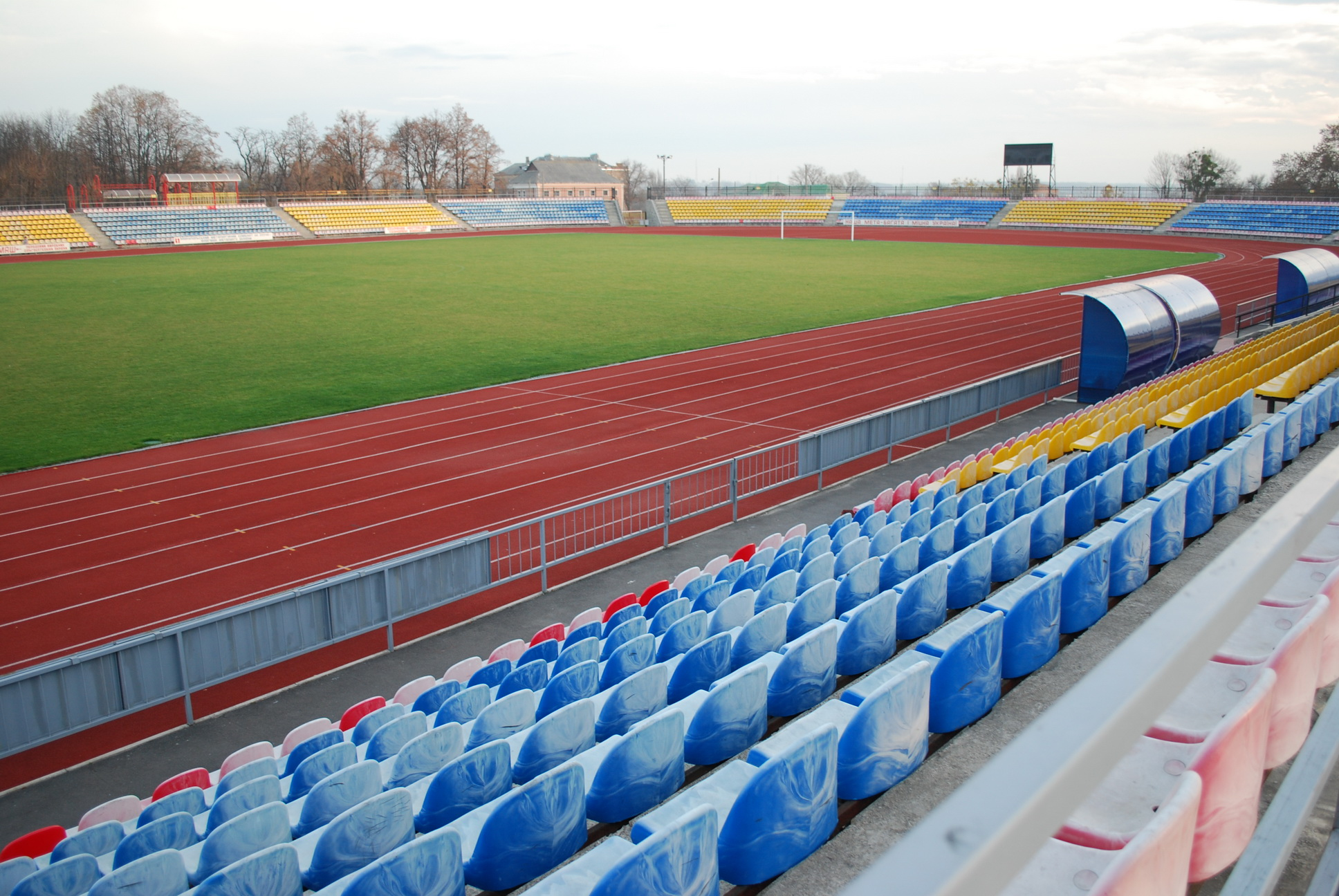
Tsentralnyi Stadium

Pantery Uman is Ukrainian professional women's football club from Uman. The team play in the Top Division, and in the Women's Cup.

== Notable people ==
- Ivan Gonta (c. 1705-1768) - Ukrainian rebel and commander of Uman Cossack militia
- Yehuda Magidovitch (1886-1961) - Israeli architect
- Nachman of Breslov (1772–1810) - Jewish religious leader
- Yuriy Smolych (1900-1976) - Ukrainian Soviet writer
- Olesya Vadimovna Sokur (1960–2025) – biologist and biochemist

== Twin towns – sister cities ==
Uman is twinned with:

- Ashkelon, Israel
- Davis, California, United States
- Gniezno, Poland
- Haapsalu, Estonia
- Kórnik, Poland
- Łańcut, Poland
- Milford Haven, Wales, United Kingdom
- Nof HaGalil, Israel
- Radviliškis, Lithuania
- Romilly-sur-Seine, France
- Safed, Israel

== Gallery ==
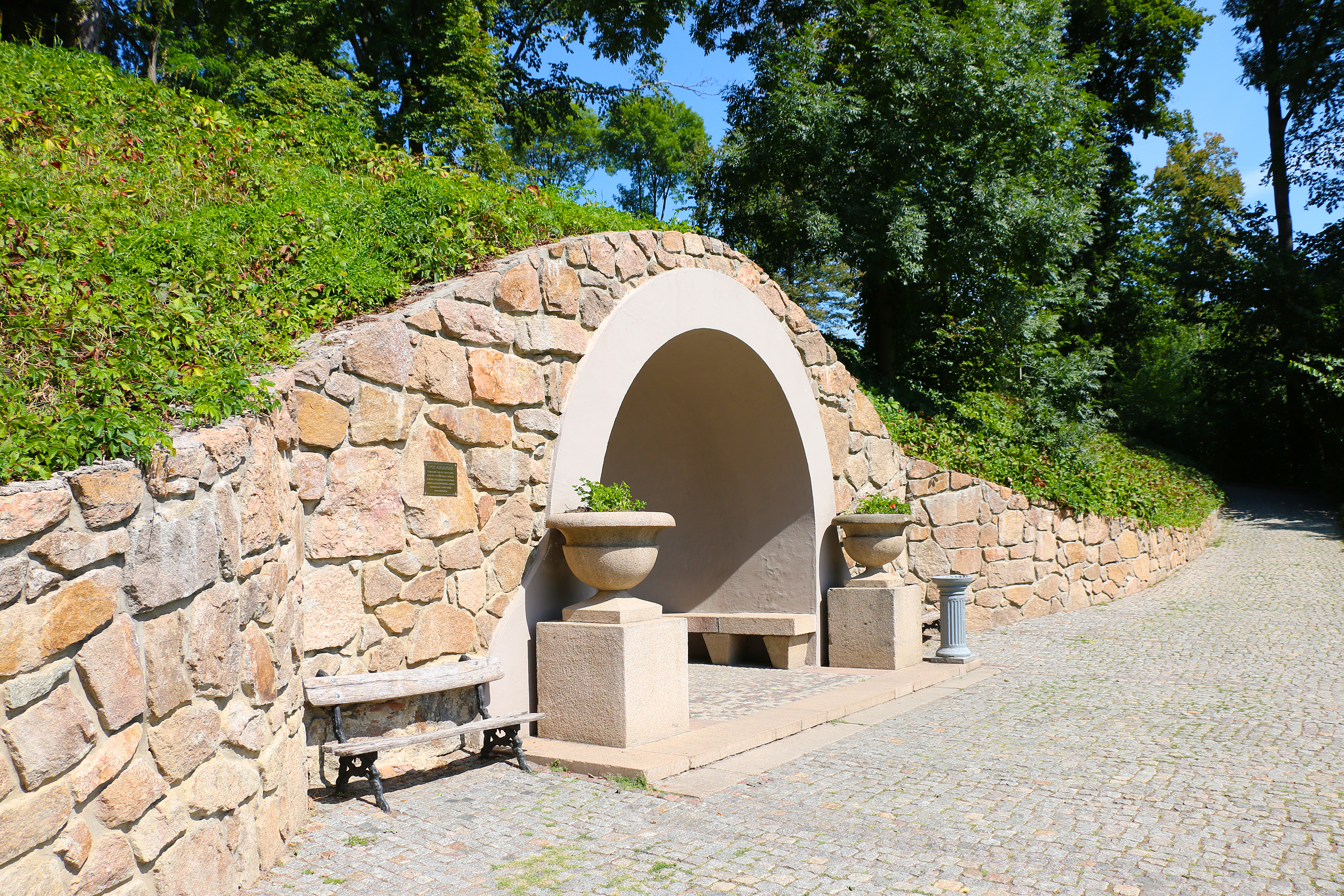
Apollo's Grotto

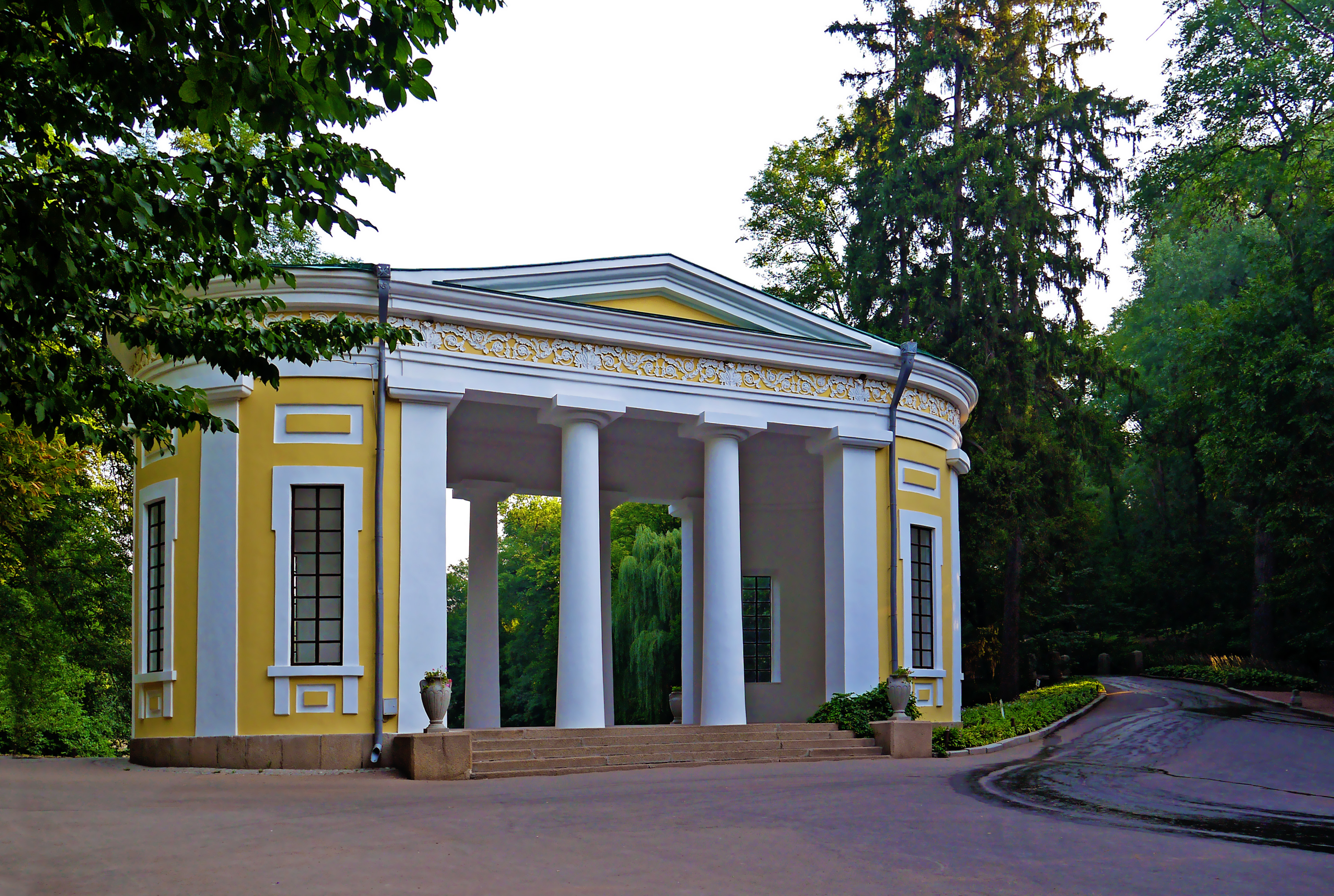
Flora's Pavilion

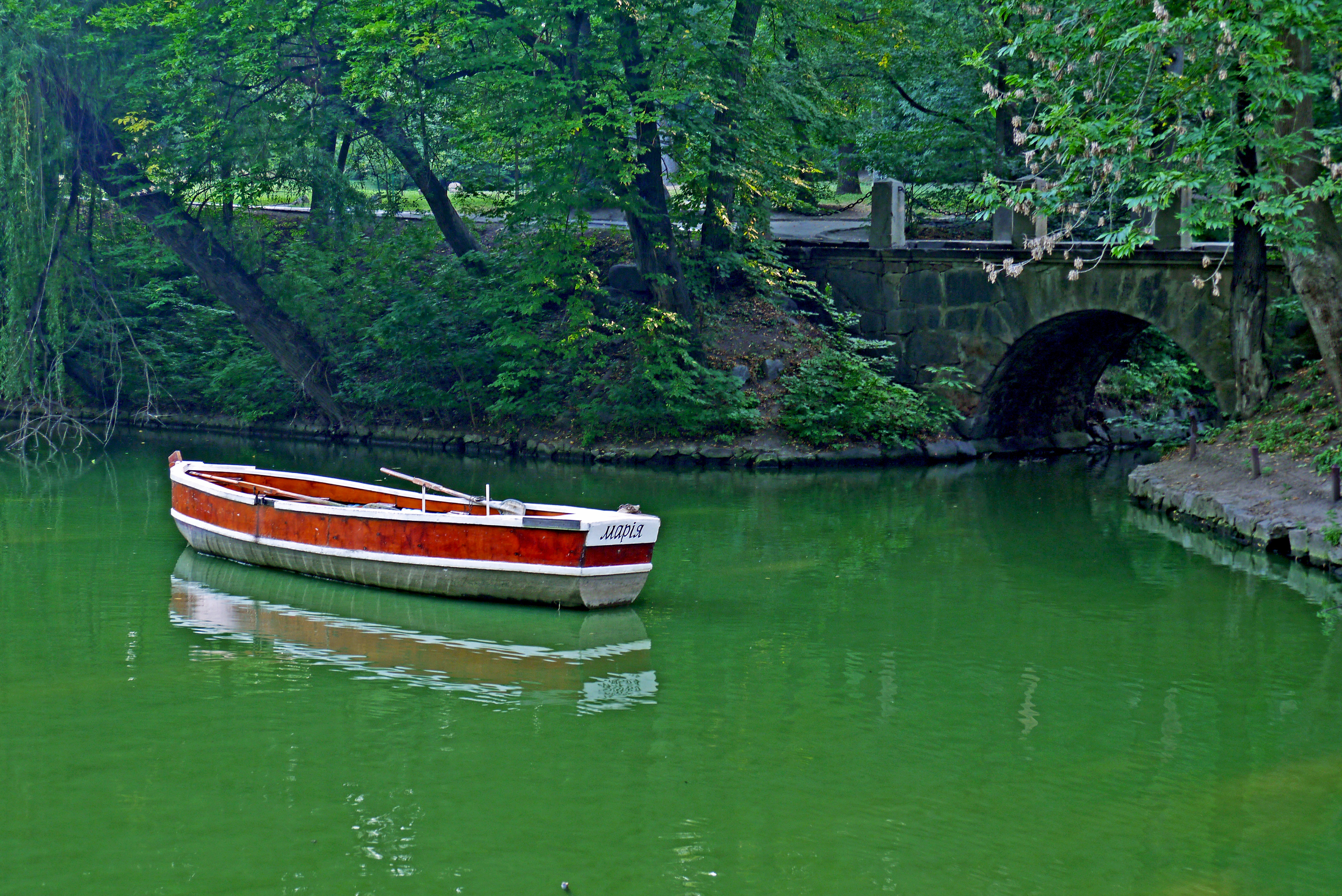
Venetian Bridge

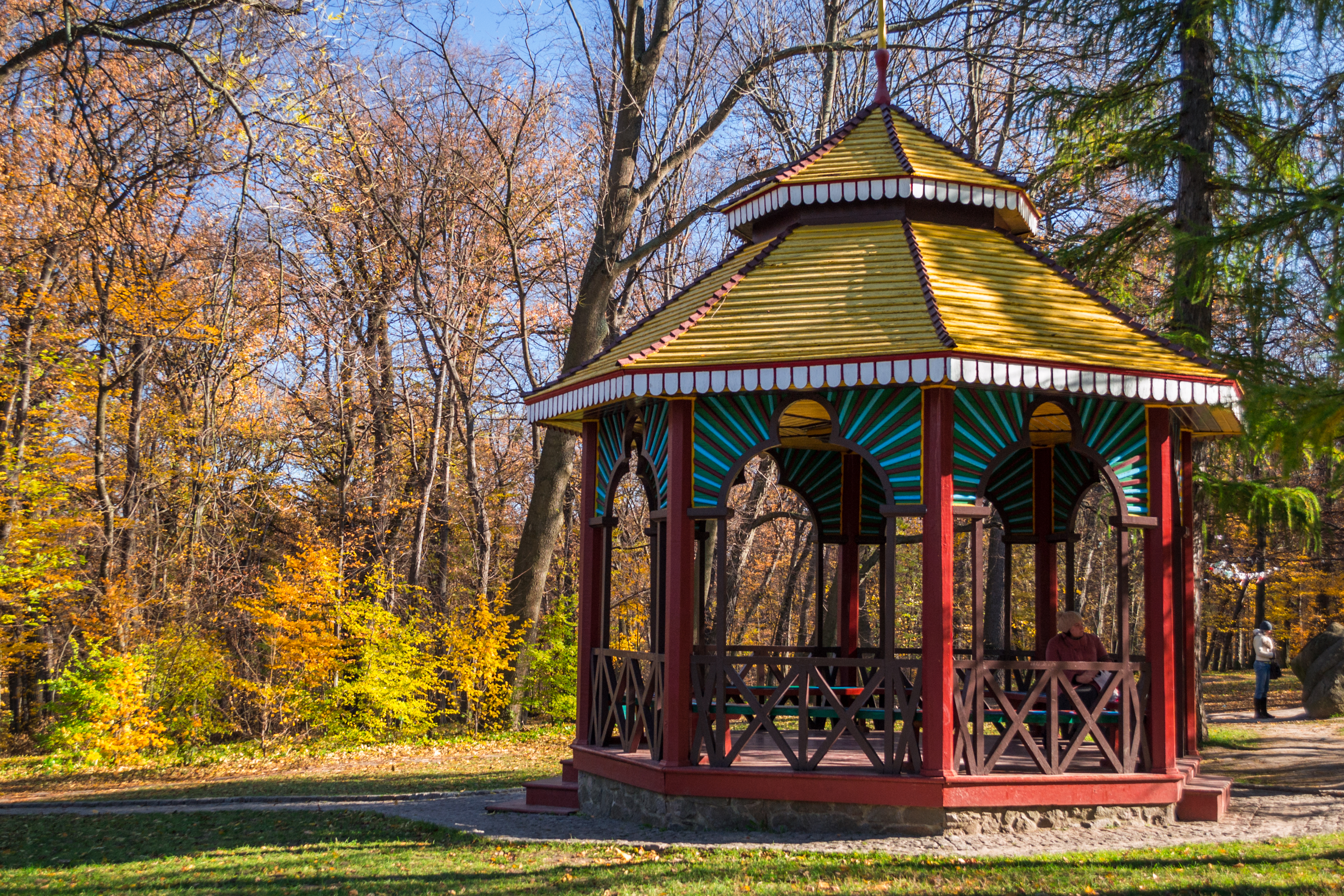
Chinese Pavilion

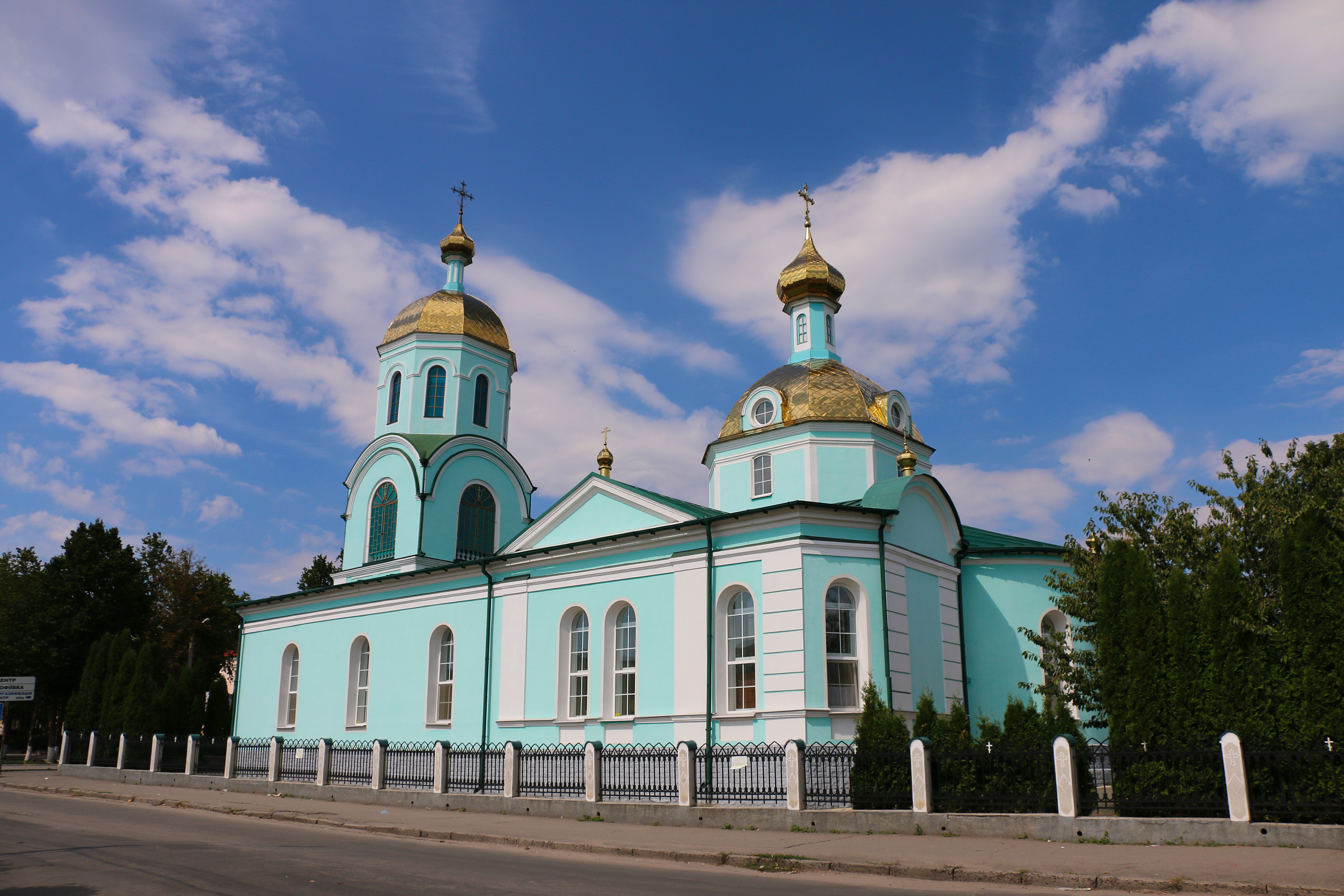
Saint Nicholas Church

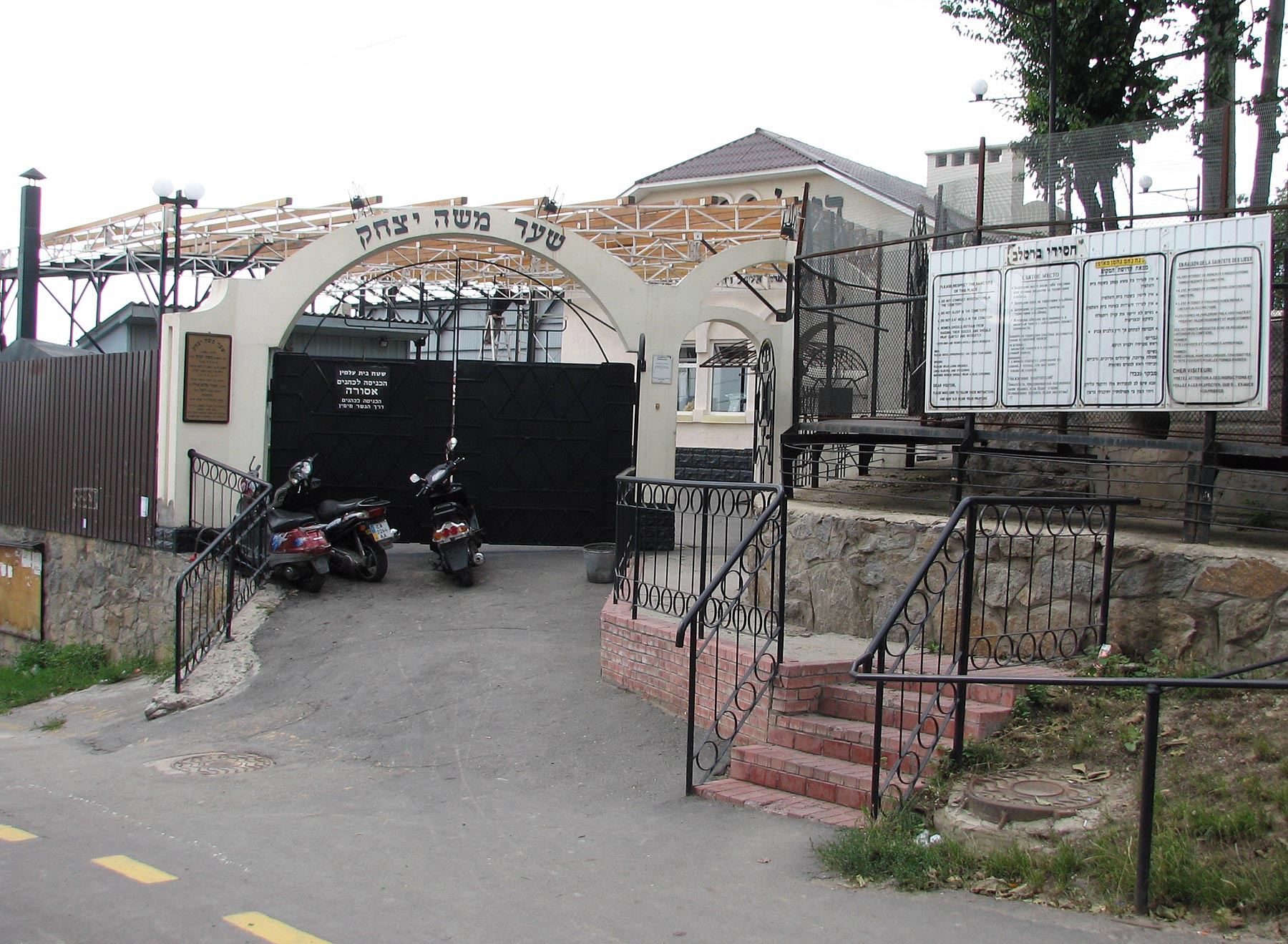
The Ohel of Rebbe Nachman of Breslov

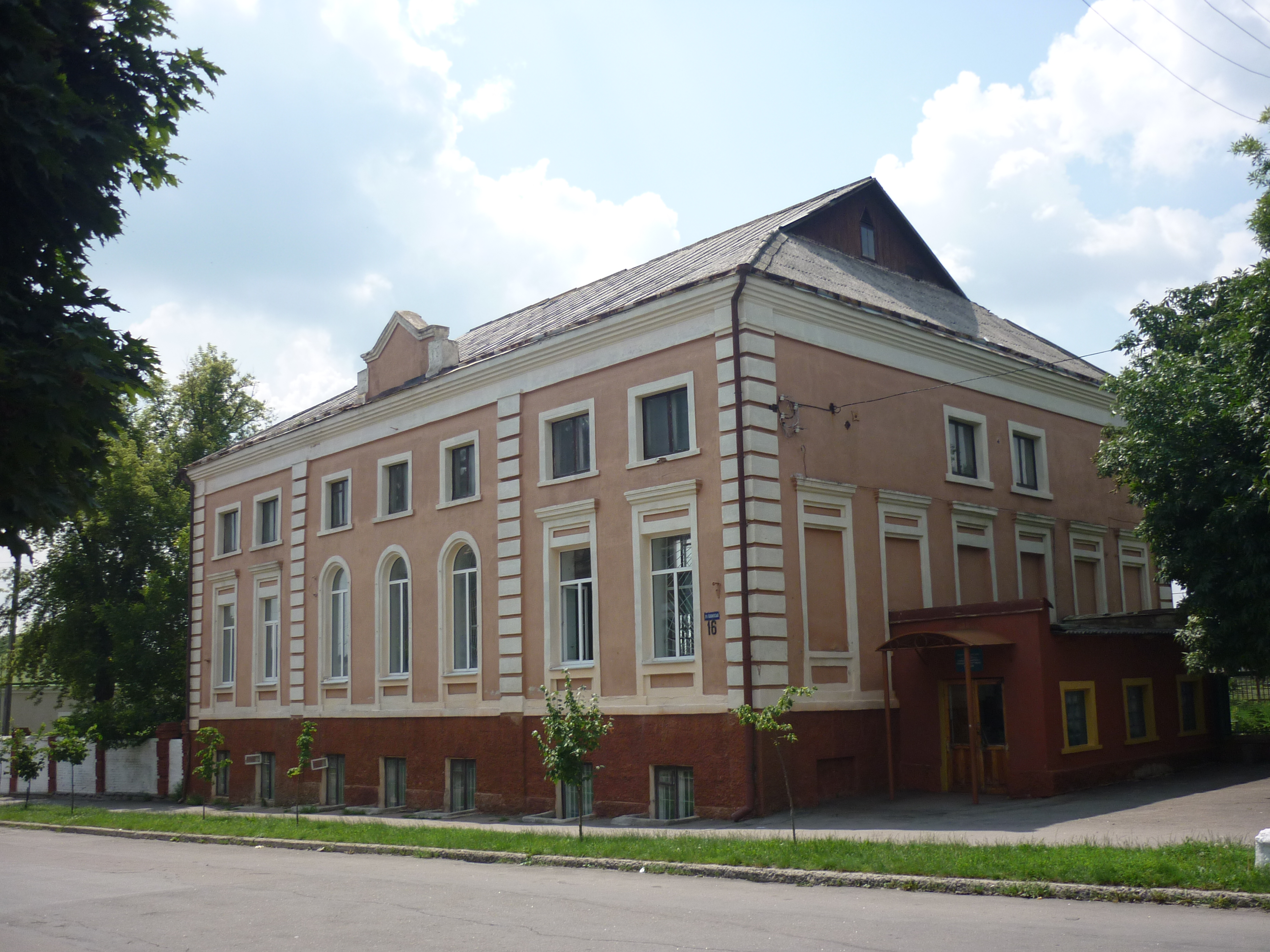
School building (mid-19th century)

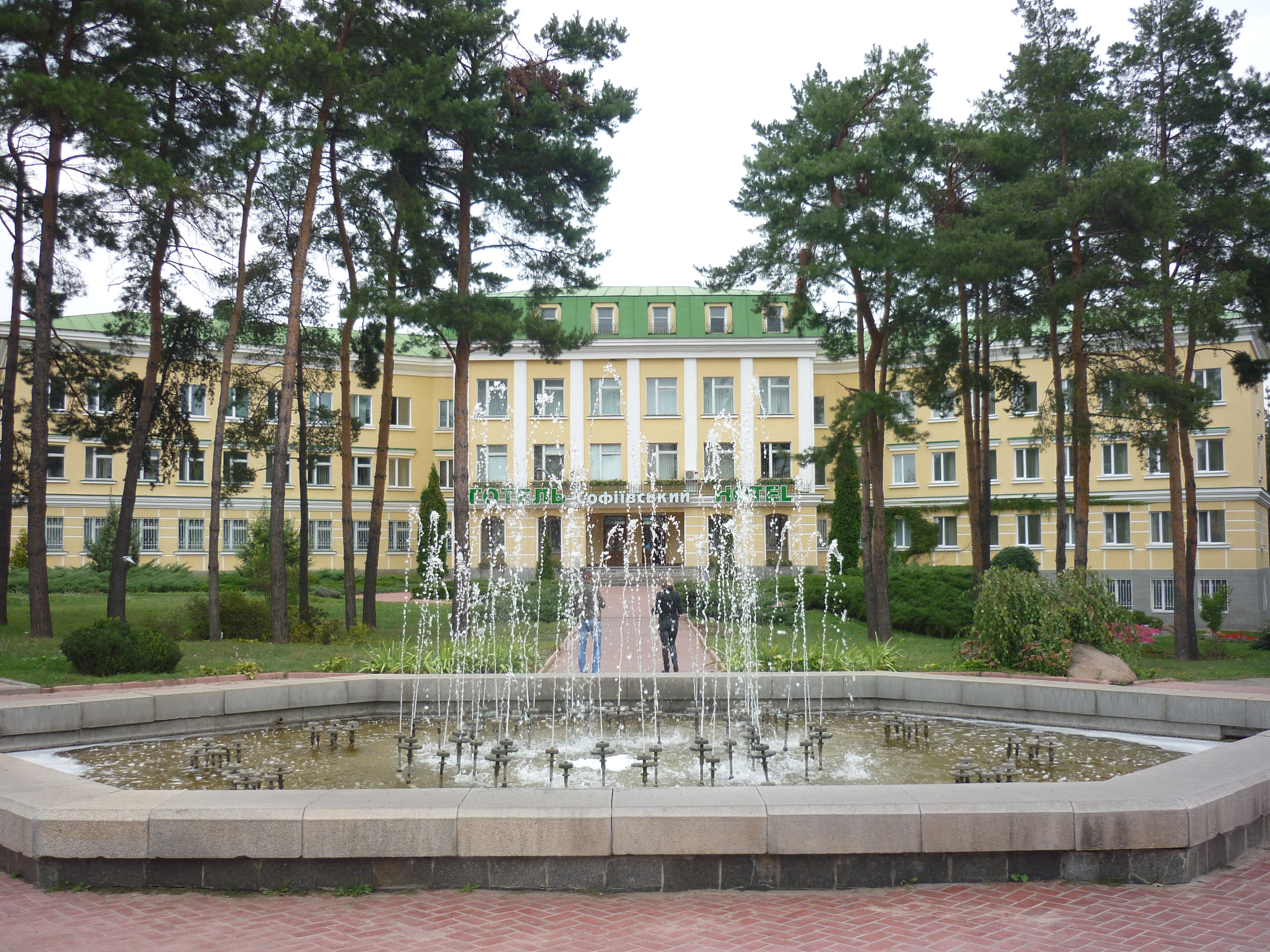
Hotel Sofiivskyi

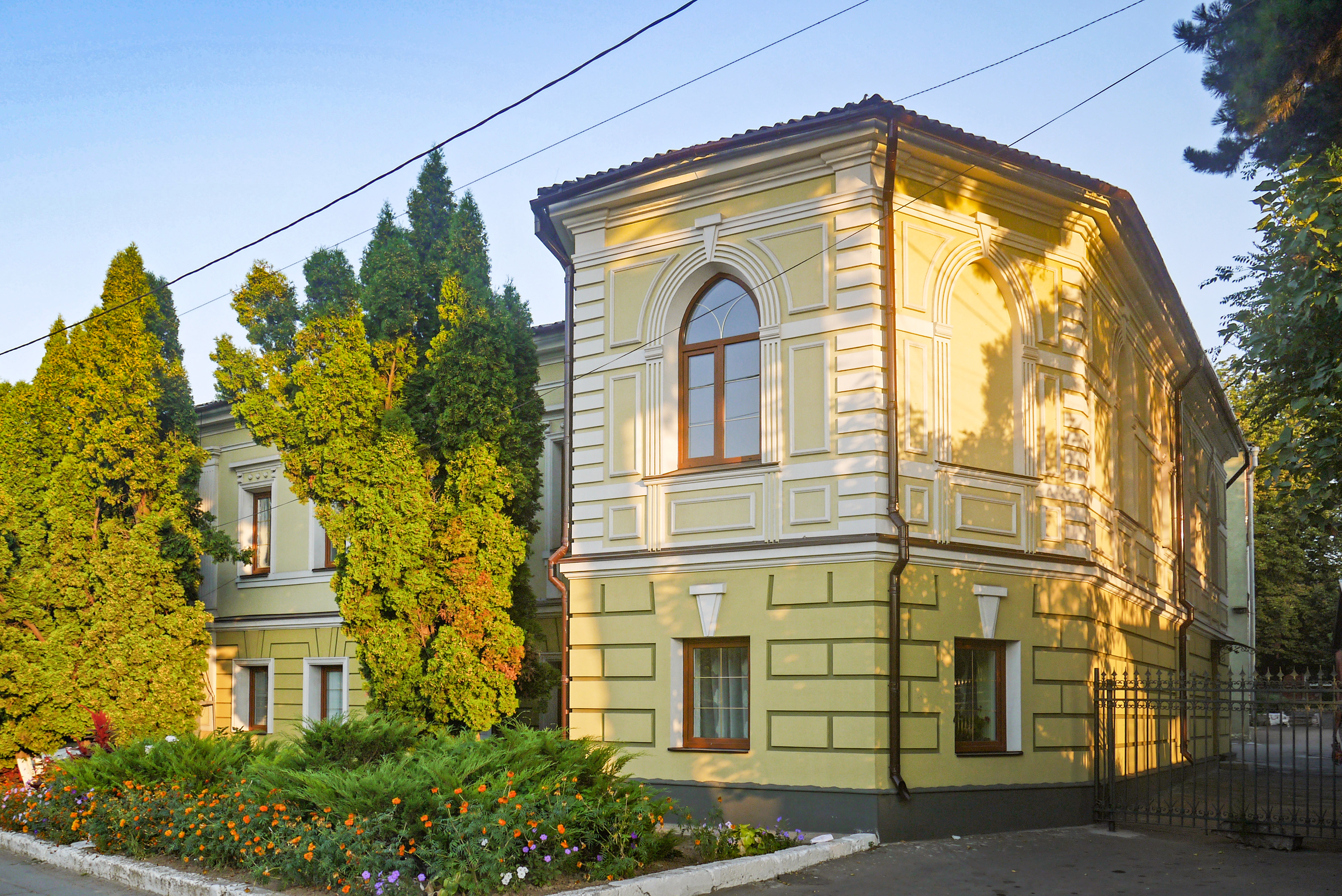
Manor at Shevchenka Street, 2

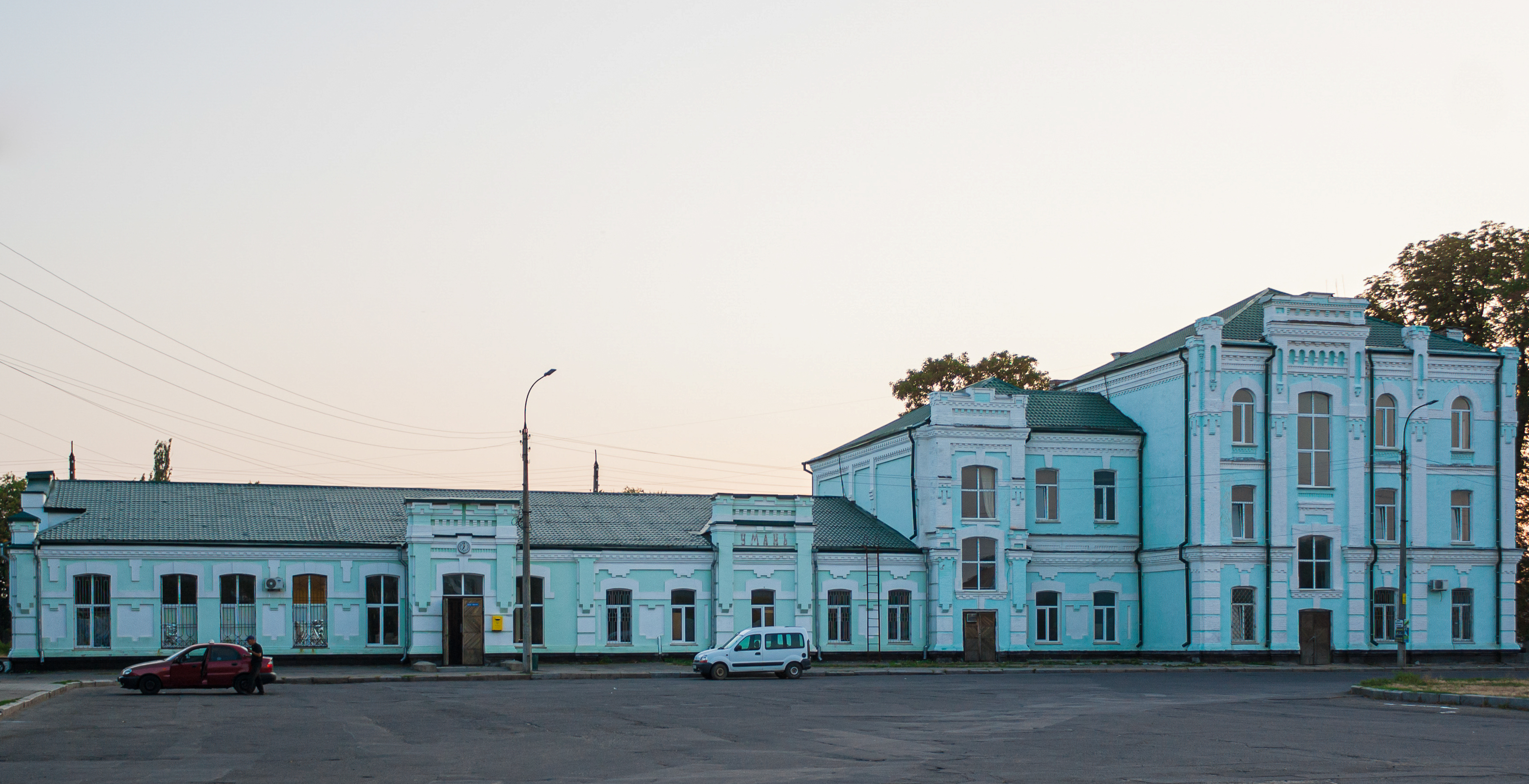
Railway station

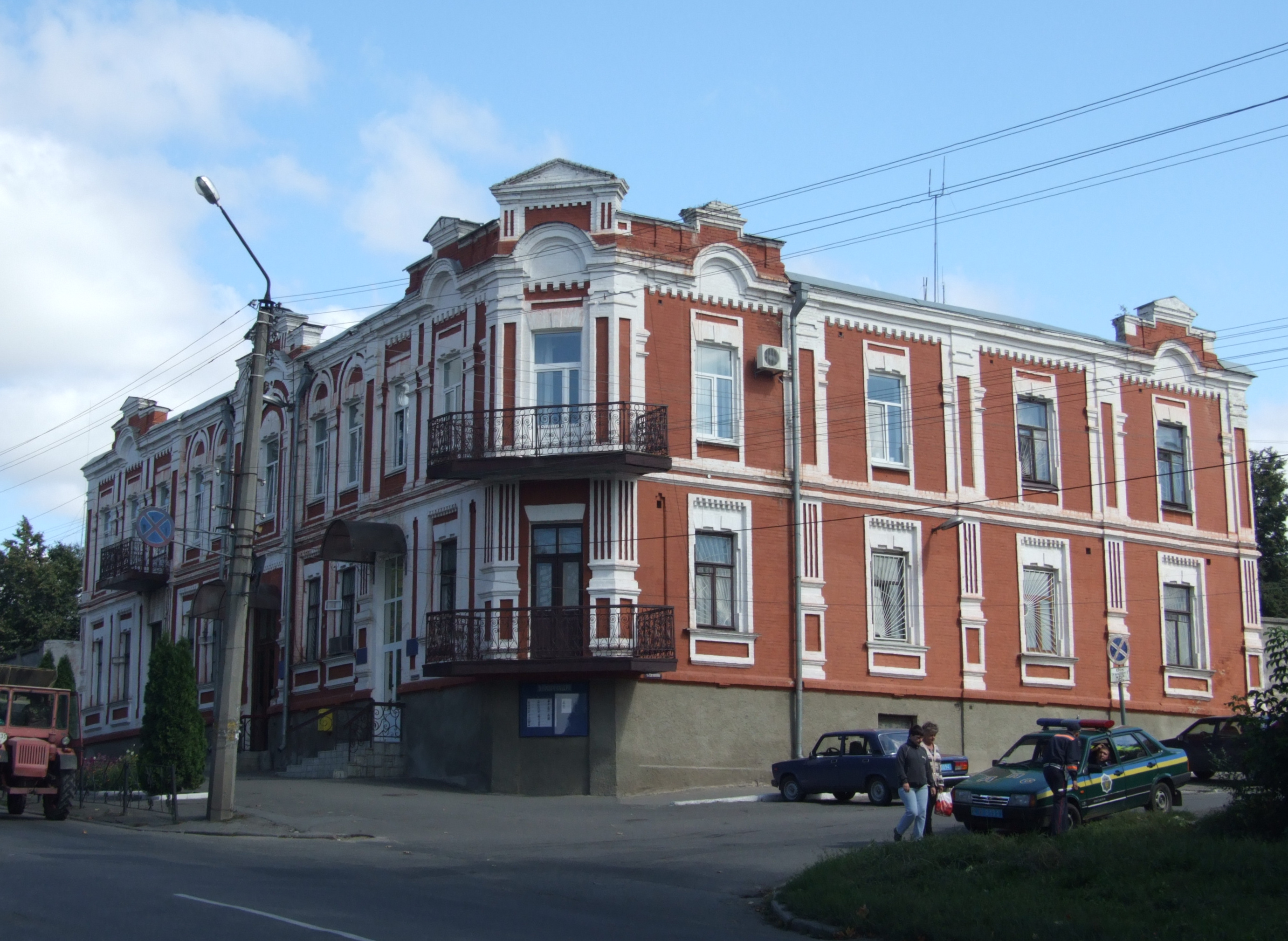
Police department

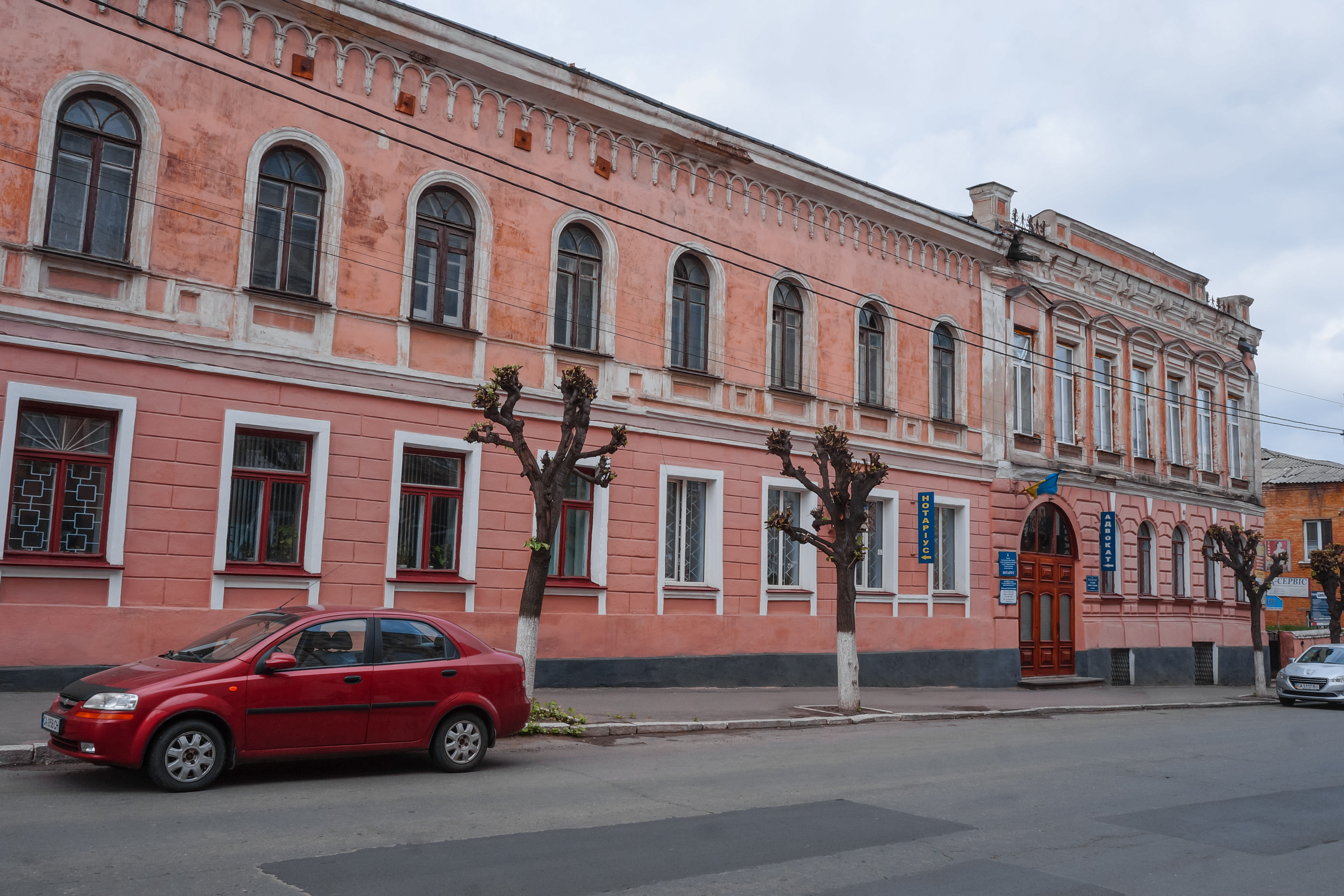
Commercial Bank (mid-19th century)

== See also ==
- Sofiyivka Park – a landscape park near the city

== Bibliography ==
- (in Ukrainian) (1972) Історіа міст і сіл Української CCP - Черкаська область (History of Towns and Villages of the Ukrainian SSR - Cherkasy Oblast), Kyiv.
