= Pavlo Tychyna Uman State Pedagogical University =

Public university in Uman, Ukraine

- Уманський державний педагогічний університет імені Павла Тичини
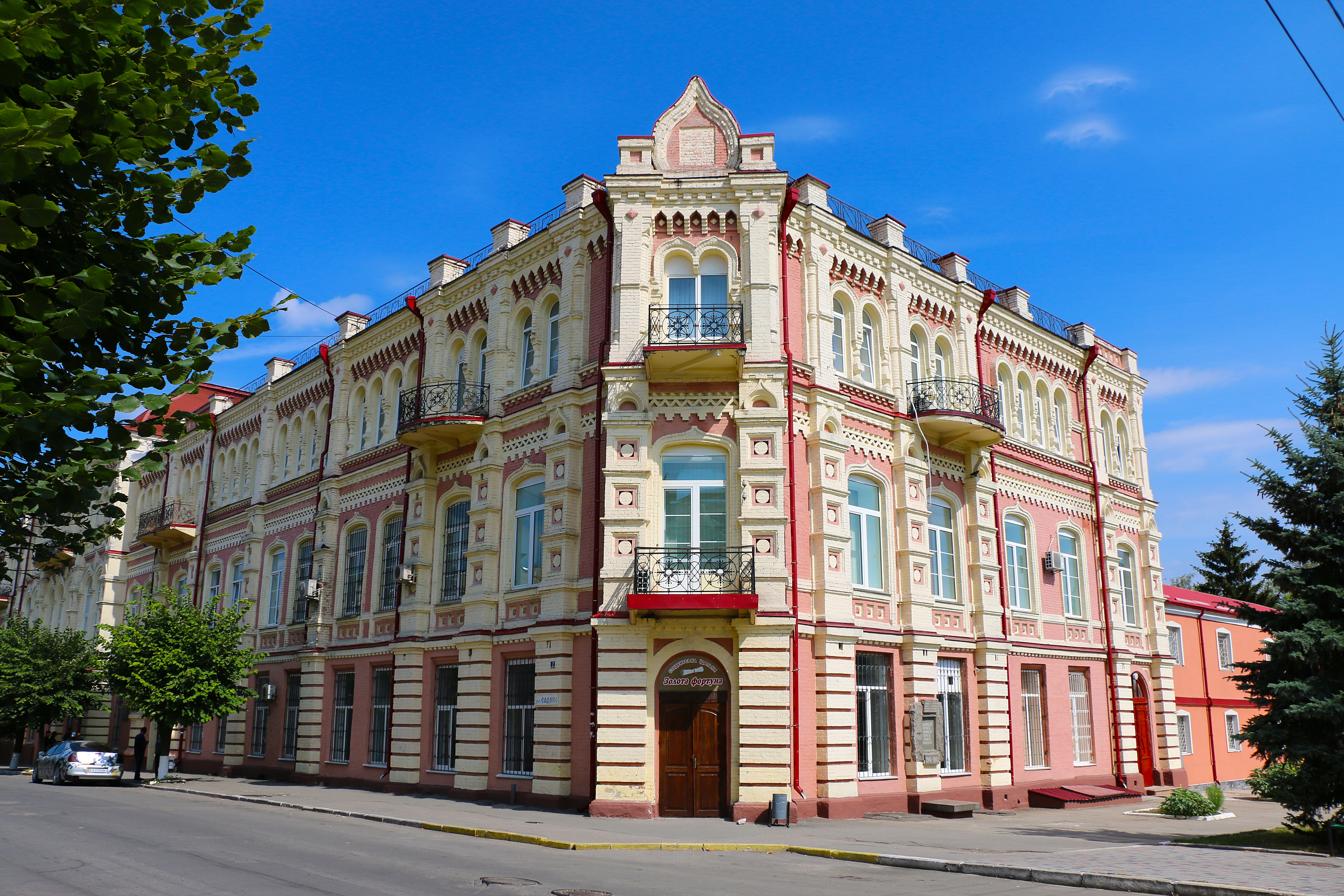
- Main building
- Established: 1930
- Affiliations: Ministry of Education and Science of Ukraine
- Rector: Doctor of Sciences (Pedagogy), professor, honored worker of education of Ukraine Oleksandr I. Bezliudnyi
- Students: ~8000
- Location: 2 Sadova Street, Uman, Ukraine; 48°44′57″N 30°13′25″E
- Campus: Urban
- Website: udpu.edu.ua
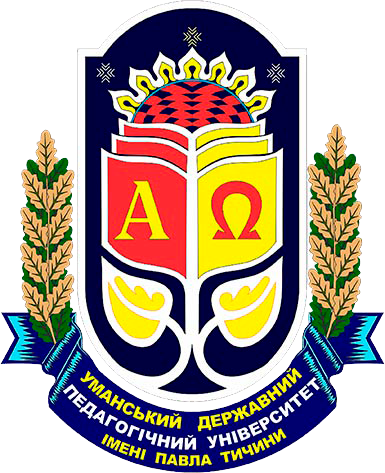

University rankings

Regional – Overall
- QS Emerging Europe and Central Asia: 351-400 (2022)

Pavlo Tychyna Uman State Pedagogical University (Ukrainian: Уманський державний педагогічний університет імені Павла Тичини) is a Ukrainian university in Uman, Cherkasy Oblast, in Central Ukraine.

== History ==
The university was founded in August 1930 under the name of the Institute of Social Education (Ukrainian: Інститут соціального виховання); it had four faculties: technical, mathematical, socio-economic, linguistic and literary, biological. Training lasted three years. One hundred twenty students initially enrolled. In 1933, the institute was renamed as the Pedagogical Institute offering four years of study and four faculties: historical, linguistic-literary, mathematical, biological. In 1935, the name was changed to Teacher's Institute, which had two faculties – physical and mathematical and natural-geographical. In 1941, following the Nazi invasion of the Soviet Union temporarily ceased to exist. In June 1944 Council of People's Commissars of the Soviet Union issued a resolution to renew the activity of the educational institution. On June 15, 1944, its two faculties: physical-mathematical and natural-geographical, resumed their work. In 1946 the Faculty of History was restored, in 1947 the Faculty of Natural Sciences of the Odesa Teachers' Institute was joined, a year later the same faculty of the Kyiv Institute. In 1952 Uman Teacher Training Institute was reorganized into Uman State Pedagogical Institute. In 1960 The Faculty of Pedagogy and Methods of Primary Education was established. In 1967 the university was named after Pavlo Tychyna.

== Campuses and buildings ==
The university is housed in five buildings; besides it has two hotels, two canteens as well as some workshops and a sports complex. The university has research agricultural station used for student field practice. The total training area of the university is 23.069 square meters. The university has an Orthodox church.

The university consists of 11 faculties and 1 educational-scientific institute:

Faculty of Physics, Mathematics and Informatics; Faculty of History; Faculty of Preschool and Special Education; Faculty of Foreign Languages; Faculty of Arts; Faculty of Engineering and Pedagogical Education; Faculty of Social and Psychological Education; Faculty of Ukrainian Philology; Faculty of Physical Education; Faculty of Primary Education; Natural Sciences and Geography Faculty; Institute of Economics and Business Education;

== Honorable doctors and famous alumni ==
- Oleksandr Krykun – graduate of the Department of Teaching, bronze medalist at the Olympic Games in Atlanta −96, a competitor of the Olympic Games in Sydney, a member of the National Olympic Committee of Ukraine, chairman of the Committee of Athletes.
- Yuriy Bodrov – Mayor of Uman.
- Maryna Pavlenko – Member of the National Union of Writers of Ukraine.

== Awards and reputation ==
- 2006 – Diploma of the Cabinet of Ministers of Ukraine;
- 2008 – International exhibition "Modern Education in Ukraine – 2008" (winner in the nomination "The Application of Achievements of Pedagogy in Educational Practice," the honorary title of "The Leader of Modern Education")
- 2008 – 2009 – Rating of higher educational institutions of Ukraine of III-IV accreditation levels (159th position),
- 2010 – Rating of higher educational institutions of Ukraine of III-IV accreditation levels (142nd position).
- 2011 – 2012 academic year
- 2011 – Rating of higher educational establishments of Ukraine III-IV accreditation levels (4th position) Rating "Top 200 Ukraine" (142nd position), Rating "Vebometrix" (54th position), International Academic Rating of Popularity and Quality "Golden Fortune" (silver medal "For Significant Contribution to the Training of Highly Qualified Teachers for Public Education of Ukraine" and order "For Patriotism” of the 2nd degree).

International exhibition "Modern Education – 2011" (Silver medal in the "Implementation of Competencies as a Basis for Training Competitive Specialists in Higher Education"); XIX International Exhibition "Education and Career – 2011" (Grand Prix "Leader of National Education", and the Silver Medal in the category "Competence Approach in Higher Education"); Third National Exhibition-presentation "Innovations in Modern Education" (Gold medal in the category "Innovations in the Use of IT in Education") XX International Exhibition "Education and Career – 2011" (November 2011) (Gold medal for "Youth Career Guidance").

- XXI International Exhibition "Education and Career – 2012" (Grand Prix, the honorary title of "Leader of National Education").

Honorary Diploma of the Cabinet of Ministers of Ukraine for outstanding achievements in teacher training.
