= Atamanshchina =

Rule of Ukrainian warlords during the Russian Civil War

Atamanshchina (Russian: атаманщина), otamanshchyna (Ukrainian: Отаманщина), otamania (Ukrainian: Отаманія), or atamanism (Note: In this context, the suffix -shchina is basically equivalent to -ism, only usually it has negative connotations, as in "Yezhovshchina".) was a political situation during the Russian Civil War in Ukraine and in some parts of Russia. With absent or weak central power, some areas were ruled by warlords, typically styled as atamans, a traditional Cossack military rank. In Ukraine, these atamans showed lack of subordination towards the Second Hetmanate and later towards the Directorate of Ukraine.

The peak of the phenomenon took place in 1919. Over time the term acquired the generic meaning of the decentralized rule of warlords.

== History ==
=== Early rebel groups ===
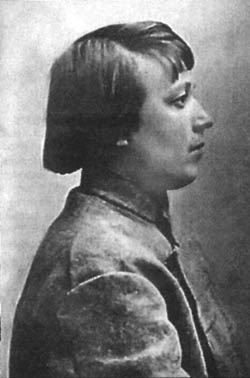
Maria (Marusia) Nikiforova

Among the first rebel squads created during the Russian Civil War was the anarchist Black Guard led by Maria Nikiforova, whose forces in September 1917 established control over Oleksandrivsk and Katerynoslav. Nikiforova cooperated with Bolshevik commander Mikhail Muravyov, and her units disbanded Ukrainian garrisons in several cities of Southern Ukraine, proclaiming the establishment of "workers' and peasants' power". The Black Guard played an important role in the disarmament of White guards and took part in the revolutionary terror in Crimea. In March 1918 Nikiforova's troops were expelled from Uman and Yelysavethrad by the Ukrainian Sich Riflemen, and in April lost control over the rest of their territory to the Ukrainian People's Army's Zaporozhian Corps. Remains of the Black Guard dispersed around the country, but came under attack by Mikhail Drozdovsky's White Guard. After retreating to Taganrog, they were disarmed by the Bolsheviks, and Nikiforova herself was imprisoned.

Following the establishment of the Ukrainian State by hetman Pavlo Skoropadsky, attempts of the government to restore landholdings captured by peasants to their previous owners led to a wave of uprisings. In summer 1918 unrest engulfed Katerynoslav and Kherson governorates. The most prominent rebel groups in those territories were led by Yukhym Bozhko, Mykola Hryhoriev and Nestor Makhno. During that period insurgents opposed both the hetman's administration, as well as German and Austrian troops occupying Ukraine. The revolts were spurred by propaganda spread by Bolsheviks, Ukrainian Social-Democrats and Ukrainian Socialist-Revolutionaries.

=== Cooperation with Bolsheviks ===
In July 1918 Socialist politician Mykola Shynkar organized a peasant rebellion. The revolt spread around Zvenyhorodka and Tarashcha povits, but was soon suppressed by government forces and their German allies. After this failure, Ukrainian socialists headed by Volodymyr Vynnychenko established contacts with Bolsheviks through their Ukrainian representative Dmytro Manuilsky. Soon thereafter, rebel squads emerged in the areas of Kyiv, Chernihiv, Sumy and Kharkiv under the leadership of otamans Zelenyi, Anhel, Kotsur and Shynkar. Many of the insurgents were Bolsheviks, who sometimes headed the units' revolutionary committees.

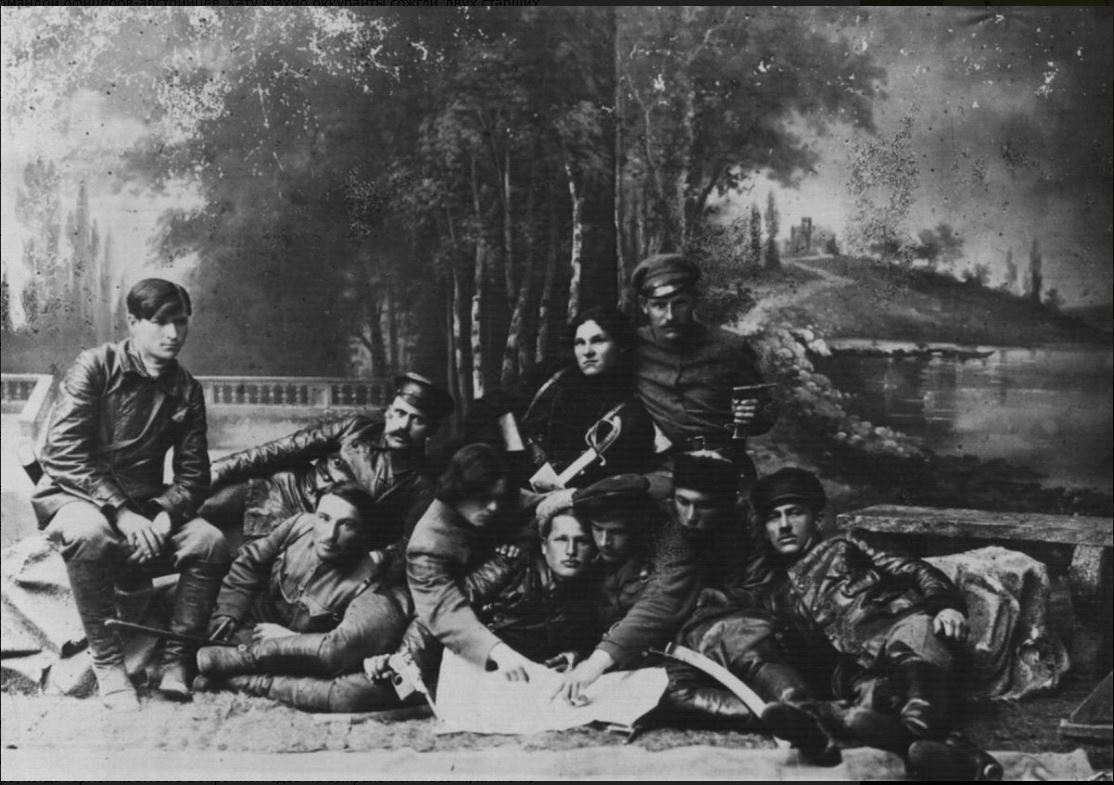
Nestor Makhno and his followers in Berdiansk, 1919

The emergence of the phenomenon of otamanshchyna was connected with the Anti-Hetman Uprising of late 1918, when a countrywide revolt led by the Directorate deposed the German-supported Hetmanate. During that period, approximately 100,000 rebels around Dnieper Ukraine formed into armed squads, many of which were headed by self-proclaimed otamans. United by a common goal of deposing the Skoropadsky regime, this motley assortment of peasants, village elders, schoolteachers and army officers soon became critical of the Directorate and deserted its army en masse. During the early 1919, many otamans and their supporters joined the invading Bolshevik armies. According to Paul Robert Magocsi, it was Ukrainian peasants who composed the majority of Red Army units during its advance against Kyiv under command of Antonov-Ovseenko, who formally acted on the orders of the Ukrainian Soviet Government based in Kursk.

=== Anti-Bolshevik uprisings ===
Despite their initial cooperation with the Bolsheviks, the otamans had little understanding of Communist ideology; the same was even more true about their subordinates. Instead, they tended to view themselves as descendants of Zaporozhian Cossacks and haidamaks, and saw their duty in liberating the people from all perceived oppressors, including landowners, Russian and Ukrainian nationalists, Jews or even Bolsheviks themselves. In many cases, local otamans engaged in simple maraudery, taking advantage of anarchic conditions in Ukraine. Among their victims were not only wealthy landowners, merchants and artisans, but also poor peasants whose villages found themselves in the way of their military bands.

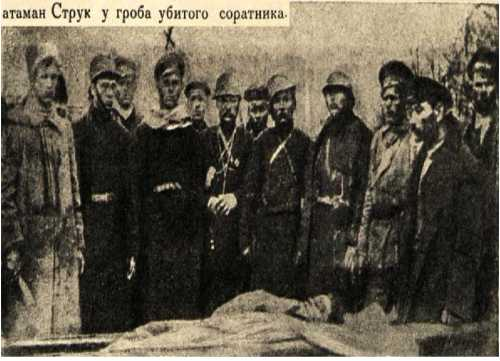
Otaman Ilko Struk near the grave of a fallen comrade-in-arms

As most otamans and their supporters were peasants, the Bolshevik policies of collectivization and forced confiscation of grain alienated them from the Soviet regime. By April 1919, peasant uprisings in Ukraine reignited with a new force, and a number of powerful otamans who had fought on the Bolshevik side turned against them. Among the first otamans to abandon the side of the Bolsheviks were Zelenyi and Anhel, followed by Hryhoriev.

The wave of revolts resulted in murders of numerous Bolshevik officials, as well as pogroms against Jews, Germans and other minorities. Throughout 1918 and 1919, 1236 pogroms were reported across Ukraine, attacks on towns became commonplace and anarchy ruled the countryside. In the summer of 1919, the greater part of Ukrainian territory was controlled by various peasant armies, meanwhile Bolshevik control was limited to cities. This contributed to the expulsion of Red Army troops from Kyiv and most of Ukraine by the end of August. Leon Trotsky recognized peasant uprisings to have been a chief cause of Bolsheviks' failure to hold onto Ukraine. At the same time, forces of the otamans also opposed the Entente and the White Movement, forcing them to retreat from Ukrainian territory.

=== Suppression ===
The end of the active phase of the Polish-Soviet War in October 1920 also signified the end of the Ukrainian revolution, and allowed Ukrainian Bolsheviks backed by Soviet Russia to establish a lasting government over the exhausted country, ending the period of peasant uprisings and anarchy. However, following the introduction of NEP in 1921, the government-imposed in-kind tax and class warfare led to a new wave of peasant revolts. By April 1921, 102 armed bands roamed the countryside of Ukraine and Crimea. The situation was exacerbated by a severe drought, which resulted in a famine, killing an estimated 1,5 to 2 million people. It was not until 1923 that the situation in Ukraine began to stabilize following the reintroduction of elements of market economy. Nevertheless, separate armed rebel squads in Ukraine continued their opposition to Soviet regime until as late as 1930.

== Notable otamans ==
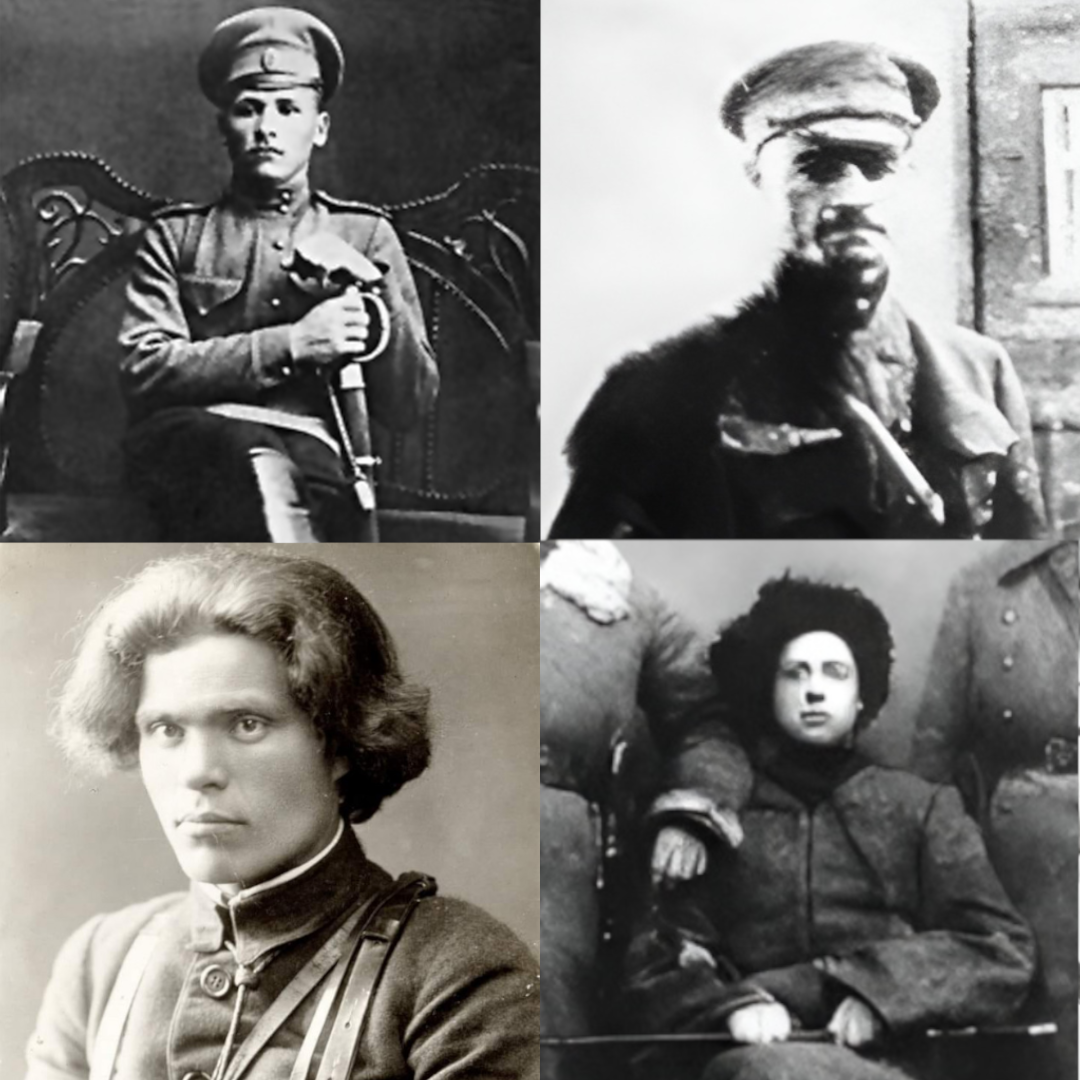
Major Ukrainian otamans of the time: Vasyl Chuchupak, Nykyfor Hryhoriv, Nestor Makhno, Danylo Terpylo

- Chornyi Voron ("Black Raven"), a notable otaman active in the areas of Kyiv and Poltava
- Vasyl Chuchupak, leader of Kholodny Yar Republic
- Nykyfor Hryhoriv, leader of the Hryhoriv Uprising
- Svyryd Kotsur, head of Chyhyryn Soviet Republic
- Nestor Makhno, leader of the Revolutionary Insurgent Army of Ukraine
- Maria Nikiforova, head of the Black Guards
- Kostiantyn Pestushko, commander of the Steppe Division
- Otaman Zelenyi, leader of the Trypillia uprising and Dnieper Division
- Volodymyr Oskilko, commander of Northern Group of UNA and leader of Oskilko mutiny.
- Marusya Sokolovska, leader of anti-Soviet insurgency in the area of Radomyshl.

== See also ==
- Free Cossacks
- Makhnovshchina
- Conchoprimismo, a similar phenomenon in the history of Dominican Republic
- Green armies

== Sources ==
Magocsi, Paul Robert (1996). A History of Ukraine. University of Toronto Press. ISBN 0802008305.
