= Yuriy Gorlis-Gorsky =

Ukrainian writer

- Юрій Горліс-Горський
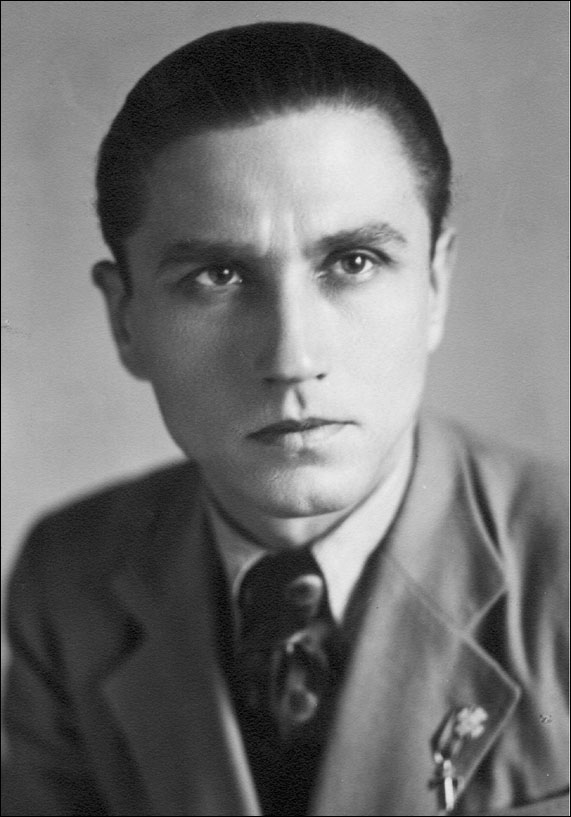
- Born: Yurii Yuriiovych Horodianyn-Lisovskyi; 14 January 1898; Demydivka, Russian Empire (now Ukraine)
- Died: 27 September 1946 (aged 48); Augsburg, Bavaria, American-occupied zone of Germany
- Military career
- Allegiance: Ukrainian People's Army
- Conflicts: World War I; Ukrainian–Soviet War; First Winter Campaign; Kholodny Yar Republic; World War II; Winter War

Yurii Yuriiovych Horodianyn-Lisovskyi (Ukrainian: Юрій Юрійович Городянин-Лісовський; 14 January 1898 — 27 September 1946), better known by the pseudonym Yuriy Gorlis-Gorsky (Ukrainian: Юрій Горліс-Горський, romanized: Yurii Horlis-Horskyi), was a Ukrainian writer, public figure and Ukrainian People's Army officer.

== Early life and career ==
He was born in Demydivka, in what is now Poltava Oblast in Ukraine. His father, Yurii Lisovskyi, was an officer of the Russian Imperial Army, while his mother, Ludwika Sokolowska, came from a Polish noble family. According to another version, his year of birth was 1902, in Tarnoruda in Podolia.

He participated in the First World War. During the Ukrainian War of Independence, he was a colonel of the Bogdanovsky Regiment of the Zaporozhzhia Division, which he joined at the age of 20.

== Interwar period ==
At the beginning of February 1920, during the First Winter Campaign, when the Zaporizhzhia Division was in the vicinity of Kholodny Yar, Horodianyn-Lisovskyi became ill and remained in treatment at the Motronin Monastery, where the headquarters of the Kholodny Yar Haidamak regiment was stationed. He had to catch up with his military unit after treatment, but the Kholodny Yar Republic partisans, who lacked soldiers with military experience, convinced him to stay with them.

He chose the nickname Zaliznyak, and accepted the assignment of 1st lieutenant of the hundred of the Haidamak regiment, becoming one of the closest assistants of the Ataman Petrenko and Chief Ataman Vasyl Chuchupak.

After becoming a liaison to the Ukrainian People's Republic government, in the spring of 1922 he returned to Bolshevik-occupied Ukraine. He carried out underground work - under the pseudonym "Gorsky" — first in Kyiv and then in Podolia. Before long, Gorlis-Gorsky was arrested. He spent eight months in a GPU prison in Vinnytsia. The Chekists failed to prove his guilt, and on 16 December 1923, he was released from custody.

On the instructions of the Ukrainian government, Gorlis-Gorsky agreed to work in the NKVD intelligence apparatus. According to a later statement by one of the most experienced leaders of the Podolsk GPU, Halytsky, Gorsky failed many Chekist operations. In 1924 he was arrested again. The Bolsheviks responded to his anti-communist underground work in Podolia by giving him a 15-year prison sentence.

He was kept in a prison hospital for several years. During this time he was in prisons in Vinnytsia, Kyiv, Poltava and Kherson. Later he was transferred to the Kherson Psychiatric Hospital, from which he escaped in April 1931. In April 1932, after a long journey through the Soviet Union, he crossed the border and found himself in Rivne.

Later he lived in Lviv, Bagatkivtsi and Plow. Living in Bagatkivtsi with the local priest Fr. Vasyl Izhak, he visited the local reading room, where he spoke about the life of Ukrainians in Zbruch.

In October 1932, the publishing house Chronicle of the Red Viburnum published an article by Gorlis-Gorsky titled Kholodny Yar, and the next day began publishing a magazine version of his most important work — Kholodny Yar. The first book published in 1933 was Ave dictator!. In 1934 the novel Ataman Cloud was published. In 1935 the book In the Enemy Camp and a reprint of the first part of Kholodny Yar (reprinted in 1961 in New York) were published in Lviv.

Later, the second part of the novel In the Enemy Camp was written, which was called Between the Living Corpses (about being in a psychiatric hospital). The manuscript was lost during the fighting in Transcarpathia. Yuri Gorlis-Gorsky was saddened by the loss, as he considered this novel his best work.

In the autumn of 1935 he published memoirs, The Red Thistle (The Red Army in the Light of Reality): Based on Materials Announced in the Soviets and Abroad, and from His Own Observations during Life in the USSR, also about the events of 1931-1932. In 1936, the publishing house Victoria published the play We swear by the graves of heroes! (Ataman Cloud).

The second part of Kholodny Yar was published in 1937 by the publishing house Cheap Book. The book had a huge success in Galicia, especially among young people.

During the preparation of the publication Kholodny Yar in Galicia, the text was adapted to the needs of the local reader. Thus, numerous words and expressions appeared in the novel, peculiar only to Galicia. Modern reprints are mainly based on the London edition of Nikita Myronenko in 1967.

== Carpatho-Ukraine ==
in Transcarpathia, Gorlis-Gorsky, together with former soldiers of the Army of the Ukrainian People's Republic, defended Carpatho-Ukraine.

After the defeat of Carpatho-Ukraine, Yuri taught for a while in a remote Transcarpathian town, then moved to Romania and then to Yugoslavia. In Yugoslavia, he was met with calls by Ukrainian Canadians to immigrate to Canada.

However, information about a possible German war against the Soviet Union forced him to change his plans: Gorlis-Gorsky viewed the possible conflict as a chance for Ukraine to become an independent state, and refused to leave.

== Second World War ==
At the end of 1939, Gorlis-Gorsky went to Finland, where he tried to create a unit from Ukrainians captured during the Winter War.

In June 1942, Gorlis-Gorsky realized his dream and returned to Kholodny Yar. He settled in Oleksandrivka and collected testimonies of participants in the struggle in Kholodny Yar. In Melniki, Gorlis-Gorsky visited the parents of Peter and Vasyl Chuchupak, and presented them with his book about Kholodny Yar. He then moved to Kiev, where he was actively involved in collaborationist activities and led a secret Abwehr group that exposed Soviet underground fighters.

With the arrival of the Red Army in Ukraine, he began moving to the West. In Lviv, on 26 November 1943, in the Orthodox Church of St. George, he married Halyna Talashchuk.

Through Austria, Gorlis-Gorsky and his wife moved to Germany and settled in a camp for displaced persons (DP) in New Ulm, where on 25 September 1946 his daughter Lesya was born.

In New Ulm, he began active political activity. Along with Ivan Bahrianyi, Borys Levitsky, Roman Paladiychuk and others, he founded the Ukrainian Revolutionary Democratic Party (URDP).

Gorlis-Gorsky mysteriously disappeared on 27 September 1946.

== Literary works ==
He was the author of the prose works Otaman Khmara (1934), Red Thistle (1935), Kholodny Yar (1937), Ave Dictator (1941), and memoirs Among the living corpses, which are considered lost.
