= Cold Ravine (poem) =

Ukrainian poem

Kholodny Yar (Ukrainian: Холодний Яр), literally Cold Ravine or Cold Gully, is a poem by Taras Shevchenko written in 1845 and first published in 1859 in Leipzig. Its creation was inspired by the author's visit to Kholodny Yar (Cold Ravine) area of Ukraine, which used to be a centre of haidamak rebel activities in the 18th century.

== Contents ==
Flag of the Cold Ravine Republic with the final line from Shevchenko's poem: ...And a new fire will blow from Kholodny Yar

The poem presents a contrast between the haidamak rebels of the past, who had fought against Polish oppression, and the author's contemporaries, whose passivity is seen by him as the root cause of Russian despotism. In his verse Shevchenko makes a comparison between Nicholas I and Nero, condemning the imperialistic wars of conquest led by the tsarist regime. He also criticizes the view of haidamaks as simple brigands, popularized by authors such as Apollon Skalkowski.

== Legacy ==
The final line of the poem, prophesying a new rebellion spreading from Kholodny Yar, was written on the flag of the rebel Kholodny Yar Republic during the Ukrainian War of Independence.
