= Konstantin Pestushko =

Ukrainian military commander (1898–1921)

Otaman Kostiantyn Pestushko
- Костянтин Юрійович Пестушко
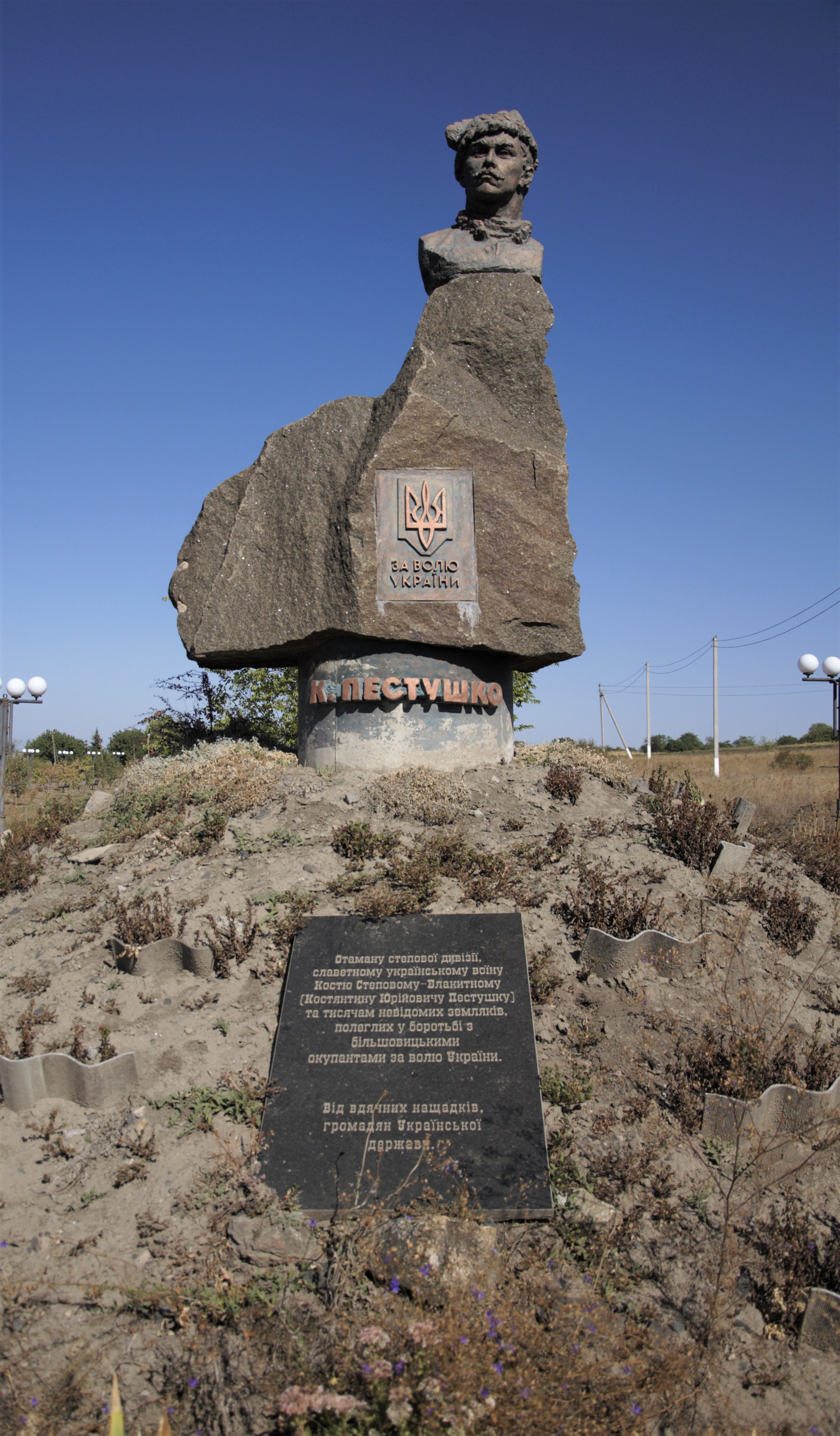
- Memorial monument to Pestushko in Hannivka
- Born: 14 February 1898; Hannivka, Russian Empire
- Died: 9 May 1921 (aged 23); Hannivka, Ukrainian SSR
- Military career
- Allegiance: Kholodny Yar Republic
- Service: Imperial Russian Army (1916–1918); Ukrainian People's Army (1918–1919); Revolutionary Insurgent Army of Ukraine (1919–1920); Green Army (1920–1921)
- Nickname: Kost Stepovyi-Blakytnyi
- Units: Middle Dnieper group (1919–1920); Steppe Division (1920–1921)
- Conflicts: World War I Ukrainian War of Independence

Kostiantyn Yuriyovych Pestushko (Ukrainian: Костянтин Юрійович Пестушко; 14 February 1898 – 9 May 1921) was a Ukrainian military leader, commander of the rebel Steppe Division, Otaman of the Kholodny Yar Republic.

== Biography ==
Kostiantyn Yuriyovych Pestushko was born on 14 February 1898, in Hannivka, into a wealthy Ukrainian peasant family.

After studying at the rural primary two-year "ministerial" school, where he showed outstanding abilities in mathematics, Kostiantyn Pestushko entered the Oleksandrivsk secondary 7-grade mechanical and technical school (now the Zaporizhzhia National Technical University), the full course from which he graduated in 1916 - but for an unsatisfactory assessment of behavior in connection with a hooligan act against a mathematics teacher, he was not certified and in August 1916 he volunteered to fight in the First World War.

=== Military career ===
As a private, he fought in the Caucasus campaign, where he was injured. He was awarded two Crosses of St. George for bravery. After graduating from the school of warrant officers in Gori, he was sent to the Western Front. He rose to the rank of second lieutenant, and took command of a company. In the summer of 1917, he volunteered for the Death Shock Battalion, where the October Revolution found him. At the end of 1917, having barely escaped reprisals by the revolutionary Bolshevik soldiers, he returned to his homeland.

In October 1919, having united several small partisan detachments of otamans Skirda and Panas Keleberda with a total strength of up to 500 people, he established contacts with the Makhnovists, received weapons from them, formed and led the Middle Dnieper group of the Revolutionary Insurgent Army of Ukraine. He acted as a member of the Makhnovist uprising against the military dictatorship of Anton Denikin. After he had increased the forces of the Middle Dnieper group to 3000 fighters, he renamed it to the Republican Forces and began to act independently.

After the Denikinites were expelled from Ukraine, in January 1920, Pestushko returned to his native village of Hannivka and was elected Chairman of the Volost Military Revolutionary Committee there, created by the Bolsheviks who had restored their power in Ukraine. He was in this position for about three months – until 10 May 1920. Over the course of the Bolsheviks' mobilization into the Red Army, he convinced the mobilized peasants of the Verkhnodniprovskyi district to unite in an insurgent detachment and act against the Reds in Kryvyi Rih. On May 12, after a seven-hour battle, Kryvyi Rih was liberated from the Bolsheviks.

In the spring and autumn of 1920, Kost Blakytnyi was one of the leaders of the anti-Bolshevik uprisings in Ukraine. He created and led the insurgent Steppe Division, which numbered from 12 to 18 thousand fighters and fought against the Bolshevik regime using partisan methods under the slogan "For the independence of Ukraine" (Ukrainian: За Самостійну Україну).

He acted in the Kherson, Katerynoslav and Kyiv provinces, in particular – in the Chyhyrynskyi district. He commanded the First Alexandrian Rebel Army. After his rebel formations united with the Kholodnoyarsk armed forces, on 24 September 1920, at a rebel conference in the town of Medvedivka, he was elected Ataman of Kholodny Yar.

The Cheka developed a special operation to neutralize Kost Stepovoy. On 29 April 1921, the Cheka arrested more than 50 people involved in the rebel headquarters of Pestushko. Kostiantyn Yuriyovych Pestushko died on 9 May 1921, in Hannivka during a battle with a unit of the Kryvyi Rih security officers. He was buried in his native village.

== Legacy ==
In August 2019 17th separate tank brigade of the Armed Forces of Ukraine was renamed after Pestushko by a decree of President Volodymyr Zelenskyy.

== Bibliography ==
- Koval, Roman (2006). Когда пули пели. «Государственная картографическая фабрика» (in Ukrainian). Kiev: Винница. pp. 81–91. ISBN 966-7151-71-9.
- Koval, Roman (2001). Повернення отаманів Гайдамацького краю (in Ukrainian). Кiev: Diocorus. p. 288. ISBN 966-96038-0-3.
- "Кость Блакытный, атаман Степной дивизии. Сборник документов и воспоминаний" (in Russian). 1997. Archived from the original on 24 March 2016.
