= Vasyl Shkliar =

Ukrainian author (born 1951)

- Василь Миколайович Шкляр
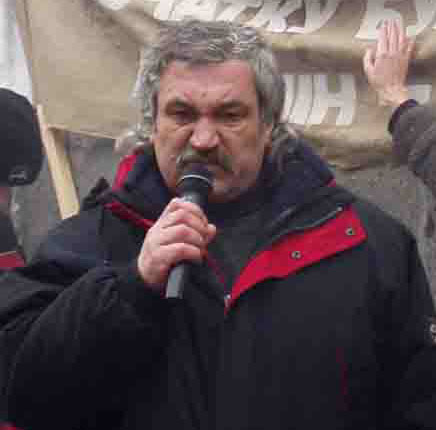
- Shklyar in 2004
- Born: 10 June 1951 (age 75); Hanzhalivka, Lysianka Raion, Cherkasy Oblast, Ukrainian SSR, Soviet Union
- Education: Yerevan State University
- Occupations: Novelist; political activist
- Writing career
- Language: Ukrainian
- Notable awards: Shevchenko National Prize (2011)

Vasyl Mykolayovych Shkliar (Ukrainian: Василь Миколайович Шкляр; born 10 June 1951) is a Ukrainian writer and political activist. He is one of the most well known and widely read, contemporary Ukrainian authors. Some observers have even named him the "Father of the Ukrainian Bestseller". He was awarded the Shevchenko National Prize in 2011.

== Early life and education ==
He was born in the village of Hanzhalivka, Lysianka Raion (currently Zvenyhorodka Raion), Cherkasy Oblast), Cherkasy Oblast, where he began school. Subsequently, the family moved to the town of Zvenyhorodka, where Shkliar completed his tenth year of schooling with the award of a silver medal (1968), and subsequently enrolled to the faculty of philology of Kyiv University. He was almost expelled because, during a labour semester at a collective farm he discovered a grenade among some potatoes and laid it in a fire he had kindled in a misguided attempt to neutralise the explosive it contained (this episode is fictionalised in one of his stories “Z Storonoju Doshchyk Ide”). Subsequently, he graduated from the Yerevan State University in 1972.

== Career ==
He worked in the press until 1986 before embarking on his career as an author of fiction. He has written and published more than ten books, including the novels “Tin Sovy” and “Nostalhia” (Nostalgia) along with collections of novelettes and short stories including “Snih” and “Zhyvytsya”.

He has been a member of the Union of Ukrainian Authors since 1978, and the Association of Ukrainian Authors since 1999. Between 1988 and 1999 he was engaged in political journalism and worked in various “hot spots”. This experience, particularly the details of the operation to save the family of General Dudayev after his assassination, was recreated in the novel "Elemental" In 1991 he became a member of the leadership of the Ukrainian Republican Party and was its press secretary until 1998. His popularity as a writer commenced with the publication of the novel “Klyuch” (1999), which gained a few awards. This was the first work by the author after an extended pause in his creative work which began in 1990. Shkliar himself explains the break in his writing career by saying, “It occurred as the sign of some harsh, epoch making change". The novel was written in 1998 after the author was resuscitated and began to work on the text in hospital, and has been repeatedly published in Ukraine (by 2009 it had been published on 12 separate occasions) and abroad (it has been translated into Swedish, Russian and Armenian. Between 200 and 2004 he was the Chief Editor at "Dnipro" publishing He is fluent in Armenian and translates from Armenian and contemporary Greek into Ukrainian. His translation of “Taras Bulba” by Nikolai Gogol, based on the first edition of 1835, resulted in an unusual reaction from the Russian Embassy. Shkliar's use of the original text meant that the amendments made subsequently by Gogol, turning the book from a pro Ukrainian to a Tsarist text, due to a mixture of Russian critical pressure and financial incentives, were omitted. The Russian Ambassador to Ukraine, Viktor Chernomyrdin, subsequently criticised Shkliar for this work. In 2011 Shkliar was a member of the jury for the "Iune Slovо” literary competition. At the end of 2011 Vasyl Shkliar established the international charitable “The Vasyl Shkliar Fund “Kholodnoyarska Respublika”, the main aim of which is charitable activity in support of the development of Ukrainian cinematography. This includes assistance for the creation, distribution and popularisation of a film and the possible subsequent televised version based on Shkliar's novel Raven (Ukrainian: Чорний Ворон, "Chornyi Voron").

=== The novel “Raven” (Ukrainian: Чорний Ворон, "Chornyi Voron") ===
Shkliar's novel “Chornyi Voron” (about Vasyl Chuchupak and his Kholodny Yar Republic) resonated powerfully in present-day Ukrainian society. The book was published at the end of 2009 by the “Yaroslavskyi val” company (Kyiv) and, practically simultaneously by the company, “Klub simeynoho dozvillya” (Kharkiv) under the name (“Zalyshenets”). Interest in the book was inflated by the newspaper publication of an extract. In July 2011 and audio version of “Zalyshenets” was published by Mystetska Ahentsiya "Nash Format“. The book was narrated by Petro Boyko a prominent Ukrainian radio broadcaster, Priest and cultural activist.

The novel recreates one of the most dramatic and, simultaneously, heavily censored pages of Ukrainian history, the struggle undertaken by armed insurgents against the occupying Bolshevik army in the 1920s. Several reviews appeared immediately following the novel's publication and a speech about the book was delivered from the podium of Ukraine's parliament by renowned author and Ukrainian MP Volodymyr Yavorivskyi. The book was translated into English by Steve Komarnyckyj and Susie Speight of Kalyna Language Press and published under the title “Raven” by Aventura ebooks.

=== Other works ===
- Pershyi snih (1977)
- Zhyvytsya (1982)
- Pralis (1986)
- Nostalhiya (1989)
- Tin Sovy (1990)
- Kliuch (1999)
- Elemental (2001)
- Krov kazhana (2003)
- The Decameron (a translation into Ukrainian of Bocaccio's classic work) (2006)
- Repetytsiya satany (2006)
- Chereshni v zhyti
- Raven (or Zalyshents/ Chornyi voron in Ukrainian (2009) (translated into English by Steve Komarnyckyj and Susie Speight of Kalyna Language Press in 2012)
- Marusia (2014)

== Awards ==
- 1995 - "Zolote Pero”, the Union of Ukrainian Journalists
- 1999 - “Zolotyi Babaj”, for the most sharply focused novel awarded for “Klyuch”
- 2001 - "Koronatsiya slova", first prize in the novel category for “Elemental”
- 2003 - “Spiral stolit”, an international prize for works in the fantasy genre. Shkliar was awarded the prize for the best Ukrainian Language Fantasy for “Klyuch”
- 2011 - The National Ukrainian Taras Shevchenko Premier, for the novel «"Zalyshenets. Chornyi Voron" (Committee of the National Ukrainian Taras Shevchenko Premier National Premier awarded Shkliar the laureateship in the middle of February 2011.On the 4 March 2011 Shkliar wrote to the President of Ukraine, Viktor Yanukovych in which he requested the President to “take account in your order regarding the award of the Shevchenko Laureateship of my request for my award to be deferred until such time as the Ukrainophobe Dmytro Tabachnyk is no longer in power.” In the presidential decree published shortly thereafter, No. 275/2011 of 4 March 2011"Regarding the adjudication of the National Ukrainian Taras Shevchenko Premier” no reference is made to Vasyl Shkliar. The subsequent fate of the award is as yet unknown.

On 17 April 2011 in Kholodnyi Yar Vasyl Shkliar was awarded the first ever People's Shevchenko Prize. The ceremony was held at the memorial on the site of the last battle fought by Otaman Vasyl Chuchupaka.

== See also ==
- List of Ukrainian literature translated into English
- List of Ukrainian-language writers
