= 17th Heavy Mechanized Brigade =

Ukrainian Ground Forces formation

17th Heavy Mechanized Brigade (2024–present) 17th Tank Brigade (2016–2024) 17th Guards Tank Brigade (Sep 2003–2016) 17th Guards Tank Division (1965–Sep 2003) 37th Guards Tank Division (1957–1965) 25th Guards Mechanized Division (1945–1957) 20th Guards Rifle Division (1942–1945) 174th Rifle Division (1940–1942)
- Ukrainian: 17-та окрема танкова Криворізька бригада
- 17th Tank Brigade shoulder sleeve insignia
- Active: 1940–present
- Country: Soviet Union (1940–1991); Ukraine (1991–present)
- Branch: Ukrainian Ground Forces
- Type: Mechanized Infantry
- Size: Brigade
- Part of: Operational Command East
- Garrison/HQ: Kryvyi Rih; MUN А3283
- Patron: Kostiantyn Pestushko
- Engagements: World War II; Russo-Ukrainian War; War in Donbas; Siege of Sloviansk; Invasion of Ukraine; Battle of Kharkiv; Battle of the Siverskyi Donets; Battle of Bakhmut; Battle of the Svatove–Kreminna line
- Battle honours: Kryvyi Rih

Commanders
- Current commander: Pavlo Zhytnyak
- Notable commanders: Lt. Col. Oleksandr Tarnavskiy

The 17th Heavy Mechanized Brigade is a brigade of the Ukrainian Ground Forces formed in 1940. The full name of the brigade is the 17th Separate Kryvyi Rih Heavy Mechanized Brigade named after Kostiantyn Pestushko.

== History ==
The unit's history stems from the 174th Rifle Division, which became the 20th Guards Rifle Division in 1942. The 174th Rifle Division fought as part of the 22nd Army in the Polotsk defensive operation, where it escaped encirclement. During the winter of 1942, it fought in defensive and counteroffensive operations in the Battle of Moscow. It was awarded the honorary title of "Guards" and was renamed into the 20th Guards Rifle Division on 17 March 1942.

The 20th Guards Rifle Division fought at the Battle of Stalingrad, Kryvyi Rih, Odesa, Budapest, and Vienna. It was with the 57th Army of the 3rd Ukrainian Front in May 1945.

In 1945, the unit became the 25th Guards Mechanized Division, and in 1957, it was renamed to the 37th Guards Tank Division at Constanza with the 1st Guards Army. The division moved to Kryvyi Rih in 1958 and was subordinated to the 6th Guards Army. In 1960, the 69th Separate Tank Training Battalion, which was part of the 37th Guards Tank Division, was disbanded. On 19 February 1962, the Missile Battalion and the 129th Separate Equipment Maintenance and Recovery Battalion were activated. On 11 January 1965, the 37th Guards Tank Division became the 17th Guards Tank Division, a designation it would retain until the fall of the Soviet Union.

In 1968, the 26th Separate Guards Sapper Battalion became an engineer-sapper battalion. The chemical defence company activated the 44th Separate Chemical Defence Battalion in 1972. The 1055th Separate Material Supply Battalion was formed from the separate motor transport battalion.

In 1979-81, Colonel, later General-Major, Mikhail Kolesnikov commanded the division. In June 1989, the 1158th Anti-Aircraft Missile Regiment was transferred to East Germany, and was replaced by the 1069th Anti-Aircraft Missile Regiment of the 47th Guards Tank Division. The 25th and 92nd Tank Regiments of the 58th Tank Division replaced the division's 216th Guards and 224th Tank Regiments in June 1990. During the Cold War, the division was maintained at 60% strength.

It is still designated a tank division as of Decree N 350/93 (21 August 1993), when Colonel Ivan Svidi, Commander of the 17th Tank Division, 6th Army Corps, Odesa Military District, became a major-general.

In accordance with Decree 925/98, of 23 August 1998, division commander Serhiy Andriyovych Harbuz was promoted to Major General.

In September 2003, the division was downsized into a brigade. After the 6th Army Corps was disbanded in 2013, the brigade became part of Operational Command East.

During the War in Donbas elements of the brigade took part in the fighting for Semenivka, a suburb of Sloviansk as part of the siege of the city in 2014. During the Second Battle of Donetsk Airport, the word cyborg (Ukrainian: кіборг) was used to refer to the Ukrainian defenders of the airport. It was first applied to these soldiers online, and was picked up by the Ukrainian media. It refers to the way that the airport defenders were able to fend off constant attacks by DPR forces in close quarters with little sleep or support, just as science-fiction cyborgs are "indestructible half-men, half-machines", or "superhuman". The cyborgs have become part of Ukrainian national mythos, and are cast in a "near-legendary light" amongst many Ukrainians. The term "cyborg" is usually applied to the following units: 3rd Spetsnaz Regiment, 93rd Mechanised Brigade, 79th Airmobile Brigade, 17th Tank Brigade, and the Right Sector volunteer battalion.

On 18 November 2015, its honorifics "Red Banner Order of Suvorov" were removed as part of an Armed Forces-wide removal of Soviet awards and honorifics. The Kryvyi Rih battle honour remained because Kryvyi Rih is located in Ukraine. On 22 August 2016 its Guards title was removed.In 2019 it was granted the honorific "Kostiantyn Pestushko".

== 2022 Russian invasion of Ukraine ==
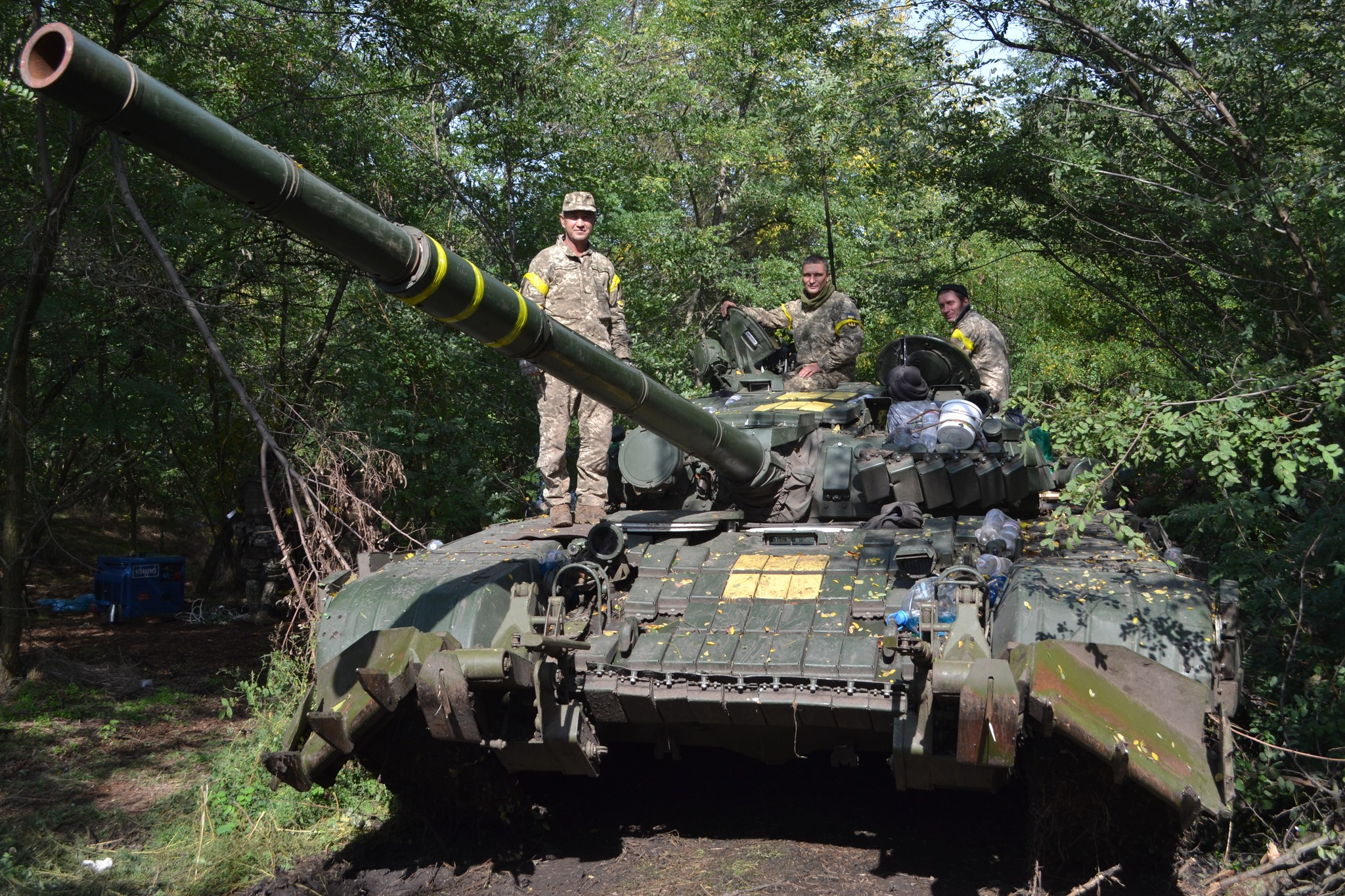
T-72 of the 17th Tank Brigade in 2022

During the 2022 Russian invasion of Ukraine, the brigade participated in the battle of Kharkiv. On the night of the invasion, part of the brigade was stationed in Luhansk Oblast and one tank battalion in Mariupol. From the 8th to the 11th May 2022, in the battle of the Siverskyi Donets, the artillery from the 17th Tank Brigade destroyed a Russian battalion tactical group. The brigade has since been involved in combat in the battle of Bakhmut.

Alongside the 60th Infantry Brigade, the 4th Battalion of the 17th Tank Brigade took part in the March 2022 recapture of eleven villages in the Kherson Oblast.

In October 2024, the tank brigade was reformed into a heavy mechanized brigade.

== Structure ==
As of 2023 the brigade's structure is as follows:

- 17th Tank Brigade, Kryvyi Rih
  - Brigade Headquarters and Headquarters Company
  - 1st Tank Battalion
  - 2nd Tank Battalion
  - 3rd Tank Battalion
  - 4th Tank Battalion
  - 17th Mechanized Infantry Battalion
  - 2nd Rifle Infantry Battalion
  - 17th Artillery Group
    - Headquarters & Target Acquisition Battery
    - Self-propelled Artillery Battalion (2S3 Akatsiya)
    - Self-propelled Artillery Battalion (2S1 Gvozdika)
    - Rocket Artillery Battalion (BM-21 Grad)
  - Anti-Aircraft Defense Battalion
  - Reconnaissance Company
  - Snipers Platoon
  - Fire Platoon
  - Combat Engineer Battalion
  - Maintenance Battalion
  - Logistic Battalion
  - Signal Company
  - Radar Company
  - Medical Company
  - CBRN-defense Company
  - Brigade Band

== Past commanders ==
- Nikolay Mikhaylovich Dreyer – 25 February 1944 – April 1945
- Lieutenant Colonel Oleksandr Tarnavskiy – temporary commander 2007

== Decorations ==
- Order of Suvorov (removed)
- Order of the Red Banner (removed)
- 15 individual state medals for valor during the Russo-Ukrainian War
