= Raven's Way =

Novel by Vasyl Shkliar

Raven's Way (Original Ukrainian title: Чорний ворон Chornyi voron; lit. Black Raven) is a 2009 Ukrainian historical novel by Vasyl Shkliar. It portrays the anti-Bolshevik Ukrainian insurgency of the early 1920s and tells the story of Black Raven, nom de guerre of Ivan Chornousov, a warlord in Ukraine.

The novel was also published in Ukraine under the titles Залишенець (["the last one left"], 2009, ISBN 978-966-14-0662-8), Залишенець. Чорний Ворон (Kharkiv: Кн. клуб "Клуб Сімейного Дозвілля", 2011 and 2104 ISBN 978-966-14-7839-7), and Чорний Ворон. Залишенець (2019, ISBN 978-617-12-6106-8).

== Reception and review ==
A review in Ukrainska Pravda described the book as an adventure historical novel and highlighted its dynamic narrative and battle scenes.

The novel was selected for the Shevchenko National Prize in 2011. This nomination became part of a public controversy. Media reported that Shkliar asked that awarding be postponed and publicly declined the state prize at the time, in a protest against Dmytro Tabachnyk's being the Minister of Education and Science of Ukraine, whom he described as "Ukrainophobe". The presidential decree awarding the 2011 prizes lists other laureates but does not include Shkliar among the recipients named in the document. Ukrainian media described the episode as a high-profile cultural scandal.

In April 2011, an alternative "People's Shevchenko Prize", was awarded to Shkliar, with the wording "For the return of historical memory to the Ukrainian nation."

== Translations and adaptations ==
The English translation, Raven's Way, was published by Kalyna Language Press (Canada) in 2015, translated by Stephen Komarnyckyj. An earlier print of the English translation uses the title Raven (Aventura, April 2013).

The Slovak translation: Čierny havran (2013).

The Portuguese translation: O Corvo Negro (2015).

Chornyi voron, a 2019 Ukrainian film is based on the novel.
