= Kholodny Yar Republic =

Ukrainian partisan state (1919–1922)

Kholodny Yar Republic Холодноярська Республіка (Ukrainian)
- July 7, 1919–1922
- Flag
- Motto: Воля України, або смерть! (Freedom of Ukraine or Death!)
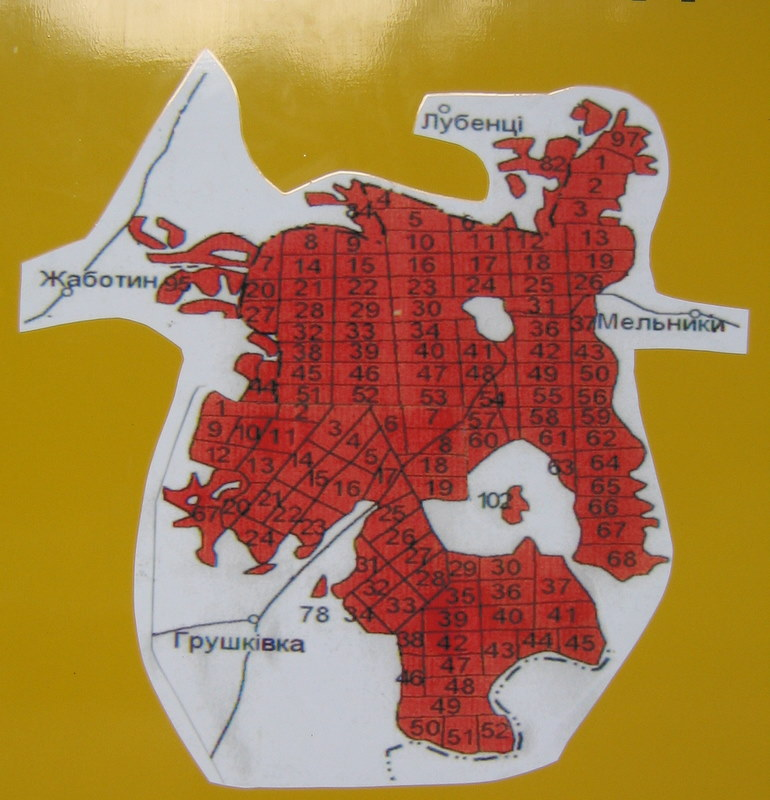
- Kholodny Yar forest was the center of the republic
- Capital: Melnyky, Cherkasy Raion
- Common languages: Ukrainian
- Government: Republic
- Chief Otaman
  - ⠀1919: Vasyl Chuchupak
- Ivan Derkach (uk)
- Kostiantyn Pestushko
- Herasym Nesterenko (uk)
- History
  - Foundation: July 7, 1919
  - Liquidation: 1922

Area
  - Total: 756.6 km^{2} (292.1 sq mi)
Preceded by	Succeeded by
Ukrainian People's Republic; Chyhyryn Soviet Republic	Ukrainian Soviet Socialist Republic
- Today part of: Ukraine

One of the variants of the flag of the Kholodny Yar Republic, containing a line from Taras Shevchenko's poem

Kholodny Yar Republic (1919–1922; Ukrainian: Холодноярська Республіка, romanized: Kholodnoiarska Respublika, lit. 'Cold Ravine Republic') was a self-proclaimed state formation and partisan movement, which ran on part of the lands of the former Ukrainian People's Republic (UNR), in the Chyhyryn district of the Kyiv province (modern Cherkasy Oblast), in the area of the Kholodnyi Yar forest tract. The village of Melnyky was its capital. It had a 15,000-strong army composed of peasants and soldiers from the UNR army, which had been defeated by the White Army in Podolia earlier.

== History ==
In 1918–1922, the Orthodox Motronynskyi Monastery became the center of the Ukrainian insurgent movement against the invaders (German occupiers and Russian "white" and "red" invaders), led by the Chuchupaky brothers. Because of the coup, at the request of the abbot, residents of the village of Melnyky formed a self-defense unit to protect the monastery from looting. The detachment was headed by Oleksiy Chuchupak and consisted of 22 people.

Later, in 1919, the detachment turned into a regiment, and Vasyl Chuchupak was elected commander of the regiment (before that he was an ensign of the Russian Imperial Army, and even earlier – a village teacher). His brother Petro Chuchupak became chief of staff of the regiment. During the occupation of Ukraine by the Denikin's troops, the regiment took part in their expulsion from Cherkasy. The regiment was constantly replenished and its number reached 2,000 people.

Subsequently, the Kholodny Yar Republic was formed. Its territory covered more than 25 surrounding villages and had about 15,000 peasant insurgent army, whose soldiers called themselves Cossacks, and their commanders — otamans (in memory of the military tradition of the Cossacks).

In November 1919, the otaman of the Katerynoslav and Kherson regions, Andriy Hulyi-Gulenko, arrived in Kholodny Yar. The Chief Otaman of the Kholodny Yar was Vasyl Chuchupak. Otamans Gerasym Nesterenko-Orel, Tryfon Gladchenko, Mykhailo Melashko, Sirko, Oko, Chorny Voron (Chornoguzko), Mefodiy Golyk-Zalizniak, Semen Vovk, Oleksa Kotsyubenko, Kalyuzhny, D. Kanatenko, 1st and 2nd Olexandrian Regiments were subordinated to him.

After the death of Vasyl Chuchupak, the Kholodny Yar Republic was headed by the Deputy Chief Otaman, Ivan Derkach, a member of the Kholodny Yar Insurgent Committee. He commanded the armed forces of the Kholodny Yar region during the anti-Soviet uprising in the spring and autumn of 1920.

In March 1920, the Steppe Division of the UPR Army, numbering between 12,000 and 18,000 men, liberated Kherson from the Bolsheviks and led a successful offensive to the west (via Bilozerka) along the Kamyanka-Yehradivka-Ruzhychiv-Chyhyryn line. The division stopped in the Kholodny Yar tract, where it joined the Kholodny Yar Armed Forces.

On 24 September 1920, in Medvedivka, where Koliivshchyna once began, a meeting of the Kholodny Yar Otamans took place, attended by commanders of the Steppe Division and otamans of other regions. At this meeting, Kostya Blakytny was elected Chief Otaman of all insurgent units of the Kholodny Yar and its environs. Konstantin Pestushko of the Steppe Division was elected Ataman of Kholodny Yar.

The influence of the Kholodny Yar was not limited to Cherkasy region. The authorities of the Kholodny Yar Republic were also recognized by coastal villages (up the Dnipro to Cherkasy: Ratseve, Tinky, Borovytsia, Topylivka, Sagunivka, Khudyaky, Buzhyn, Lesky, and others).

Otaman Gerasim Nesterenko-Orel was the last of the Chief Otamans of the Kholodny Yar elected at the general representative congress of all otamans of the republic.

To the south was a short-lived Republic of Black Forest, which was then subordinate to Kholodny Yar, the largest place of resistance in Central Ukraine.

=== The fall of the Republic ===
One of the stages of the Cheka's special operation to liquidate the Kholodny Yar Republic was the so-called "amnesty" promised to those insurgents who would surrender voluntarily.

The transition took place in the village Zhabotyn on the 4th (in other documents on the 7th) August 1921. Ivan Petrenko, Chairman of the Kholodny Yar District Headquarters, Otamans Derkach, Vasylenko, Oleksa Chuchupak, S. Chuchupak, Tovkachenko (Tovkach), Temny, Lytvynenko, Pinchenko, and more than 20 Otamans and 76 security guards, including Ponomarenko and Wislow, were amnestied. After that, the "amnestied" wrote a letter to the otamans Khmara, Zagorodny, Zaliznyak and others calling for an end to the struggle and the transition to the side of the Ukrainian Soviet government.

On 29 September 1922, the Cheka lured some atamans to an alleged gathering in Zvenyhorodka. They were allegedly convened to prepare for an all-Ukrainian uprising. Many atamans were arrested there.

On 9 February 1923 Kholodny Yar Republic insurgents, all sentenced to death, took part in a four-hour battle/failed prison uprising in Kyiv's Lukyanivska Prison that killed 38 prisoners and one Red Army soldier.

== Legacy ==
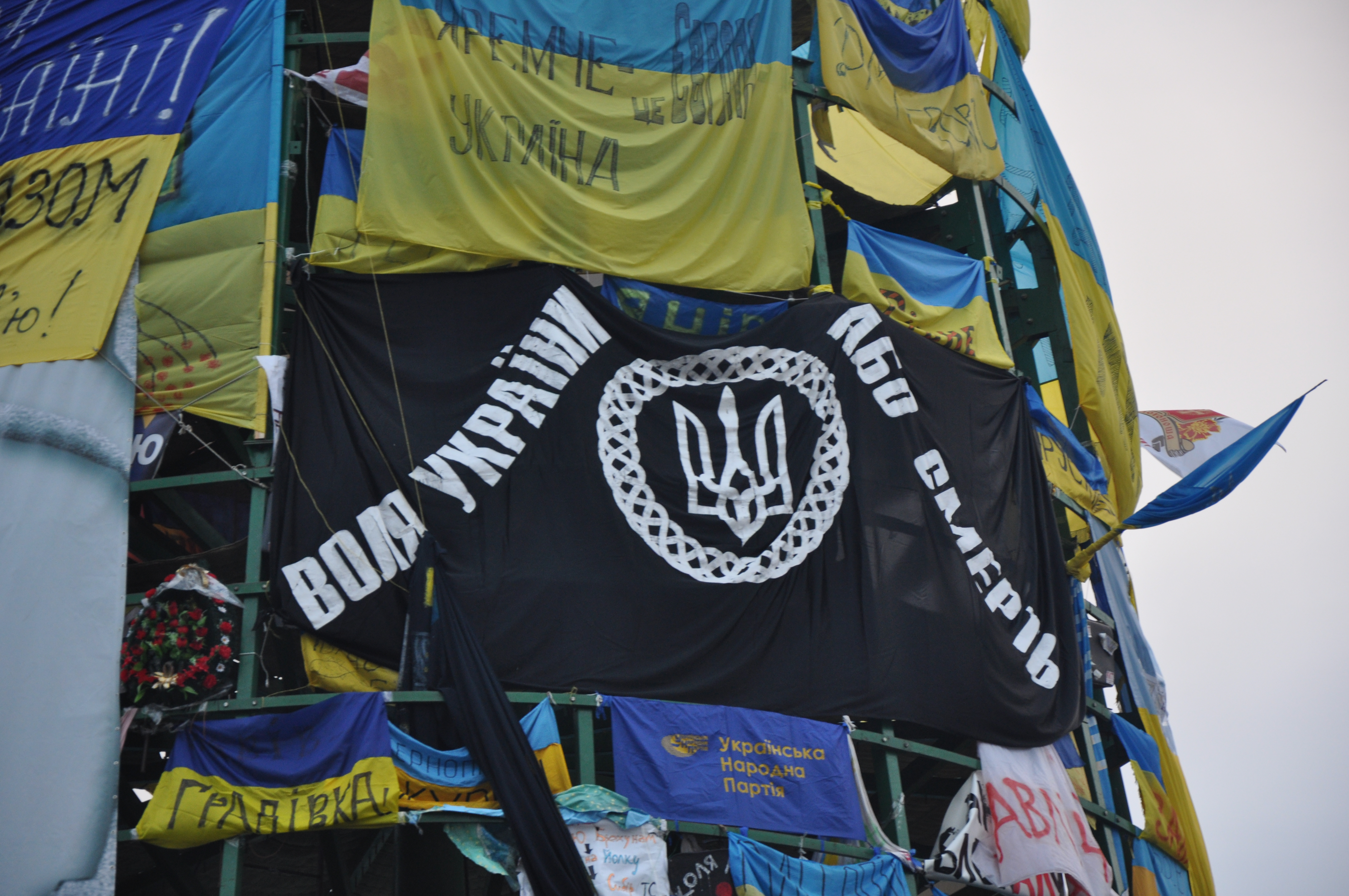
Flag of Kholodny Yar Republic during Euromaidan in Kyiv

In the 21st century the Kholodny Republic flag was used during the Euromaidan demonstrations and by the Azov Battalion. In January 2018 the 93rd Mechanized Brigade of the Ukrainian army received the honorary name "Kholodny Yar" as reference to the Kholodny Yar partisan movement.

== In art ==
=== Literature ===
- Kholodnyi Yar, a historical documentary novel by Yurii Horlis-Horskyi. The book ended at the 1921 events.
- Chornyi voron ( "The Black Raven"), fictional continuation of Yurii Horlis-Horsky's work by Vasyl Shkliar.

=== Films ===
- Kholodny Yar. Freedom to Ukraine – or death!, a documentary film based on the novel by Yurii Horlis-Horsky.
- Chornyi voron, a film based on the novel by Vasyl Shkliar. The release date is 5 December 2019. There were few attempts to show this historical period prior to 2019, namely, on the 26th of 2018 was released the film "Traitor", where this time events are mentioned, but rather indirectly. The film "The Black Raven" was directed by Taras Tkachenko, the main role (Black Raven) is played by Taras Tsymbalyuk. Plot: Black Raven, a former soldier and a holder of three George Medals Ivan Chornous arrives in Kholodny Yar with his young wife to visit his father. He was not about to participate in the war, however, his father's murder by Red Army became the turning point for him. Consequently, he decides to join the guerrillas to revenge. Very soon he becomes the otaman.

== See also ==
- Yuriy Gorlis-Gorsky
