= Apollon Skalkowski =

Polish-Russian scientist and historian

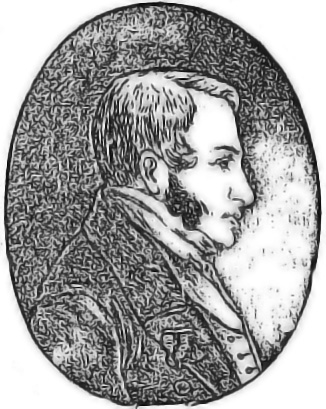
Skalkovsky

Apollon Skalkowski (Polish: Apollo Skalkowski; born 13 January [O.S. 1 January] 1808 in Zhytomyr; died 9 January 1899 [O.S. 28 December 1898] in Odesa) was a Polish-Russian scientist and historian born in Zhytomyr (present-day Ukraine). He was the father of journalist Constantine Skalkovsky.

== Life and work ==
Skalkowski was born into a Polish noble family. He studied at the universities of Vilnius and Moscow. For over 50 years, he headed the Statistical Committee in Odesa. He was also a corresponding member of the Imperial Academy of Sciences in the Department of History and Philology.

His extensive historical works on the Novorossiya Territory (Southern Ukraine) and the Zaporizhian Sich remain valuable for their use of primary sources, many of which have since been lost. Due to his pioneering contributions, his contemporaries called him the "Herodotus of Novorossiya'.

Skalkowski's critical stance toward the Haidamaky uprising was publicly condemned by Taras Shevchenko in the poem "Cold Ravine" (Kholodnyi Yar).

He was a frequent contributor to the Journal of the Ministry of Public Education, where he also published the oral recollections of the former Zaporizhian Cossack Mykyta Korzh.

In addition to his academic work, Skalkowski wrote several historical novels, including "Kagalnichanka", "Crystal Beam", "Brothers Redeemer", and "Mama".

== Major works ==
- «Хронологическое обозрение истории Новороссийского края, 1730—1823», т.1-2, Одесса 1836—1838
- «Опыт статистического описания Новороссийского края», т.1-2, Одесса 1850–1853.
- «История Новой Сечи или последнего коша Запорожского», т.1-3, Одесса 1885—1886
- «Наезды гайдамак на Западную Украину в XVIII столетии, 1733—1768», Одесса 1845

== Literature ==
- Боровой С. Я. «А. А. Скальковский и его работы по истории Южной Украины», «Зап. Одес.археологич.об-ва», 1960, т. 1
- его же, «Про економічні погляди А. О. Скальковського», в кн."З історії економічної думки на Україні", Київ 1961.
