= Vasyl Chuchupak =

Ukrainian partisan leader (1895–1920)

- Василь Чучупак
- Born: 11 March 1895; Melniki, Chigirin uezd, Kiev Governorate, Russian Empire
- Died: 12 April 1920 (aged 25); Kholodny Yar Republic
- Known for: Leader of the Kholodny Yar Ukrainian partisan movement

Vasyl Stepanovych Chuchupak (Ukrainian: Василь Степанович Чучупак; 11 March 1895 – 12 April 1920) was the leader of the Kholodny Yar Ukrainian partisan movement during the Ukrainian War of Independence.

== Biography ==
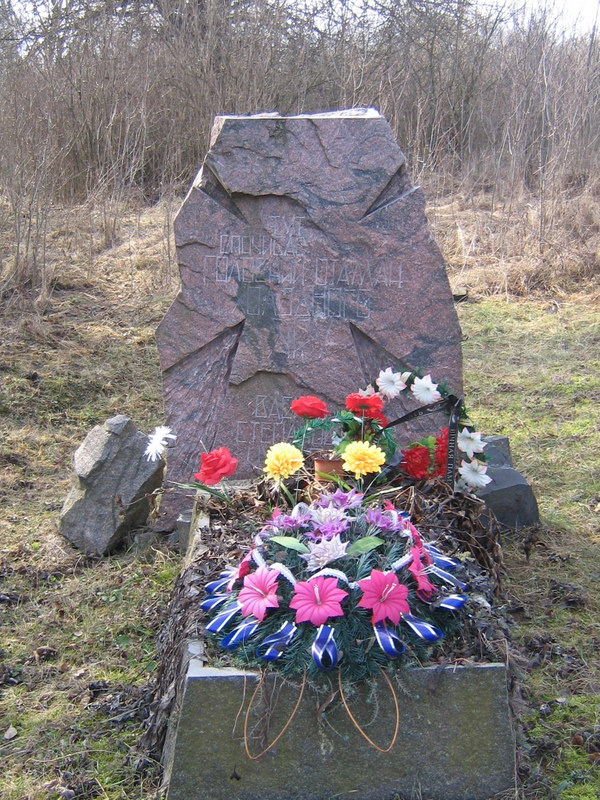
Chuchupak's grave in the cemetery of Melnyky

Born in 1895 in the village Melnyky in the Chyhyryn region, Chuchupak served in the Imperial Russian Army with his brother Petro and was a village teacher.

Chuchupak's family was highly regarded within the Melnyky village. They were wealthy peasants and provided a good education for their offsprings. In particular, Vasyl's brothers Oleksa Chuchupak and Semen Chuchupak were village teachers, and Petro Chuchupak studied in Kyiv Academy of Music, furthermore, some of his relatives were priests, namely, Demian and Avtonom Chuchupaks.

Chuchupak was the leader (Otaman) of the Kholodnyi Yar Ukrainian partisan movement during the Ukrainian War of Independence. In current Cherkasy Raion this movement formed the Kholodny Yar Republic that lasted from 1919 to 1922 were they fought for Ukrainian independence and against the Soviet Union. The republic included 25 villages (with Melnyky serving as its "capital") and could raise an army of 16 thousand. It was the last territory held by supporters of an independent Ukrainian state before the incorporating of Ukraine into the Soviet Union as the Ukrainian SSR.

The teacher's reputation and his organizational skills with transferable war experience skills made a creation of a strong insurgent organization as a segment of Ukrainian National Republic possible"

The best evaluation to Vasyl Chuchupak's role of that period was given by White guards in the Autumn 1919: "Chuchupak is independence minded, he has a support amongst a village's intelligentsia and a peasants' segment. He demonstrates an ability to be rigorous in connection with stealing within the army and tries to create a disciplined army".

Chuchupak shot and killed himself on 12 April 1920 in a fight with a squadron of red cossacks.

In the 21st century the Kholodny Republic flag was used during the Euromaidan demonstrations and by the Azov Battalion. In January 2018 the 93rd Mechanized Brigade of the Ukrainian army received the honorary name "Kholodny Yar" as reference to the Kholodny Yar partisan movement.
