= Kholodnyi Yar =

Forest in Cherkasy Oblast, Ukraine

Kholodnyi Yar Ukrainian: Холодний Яр
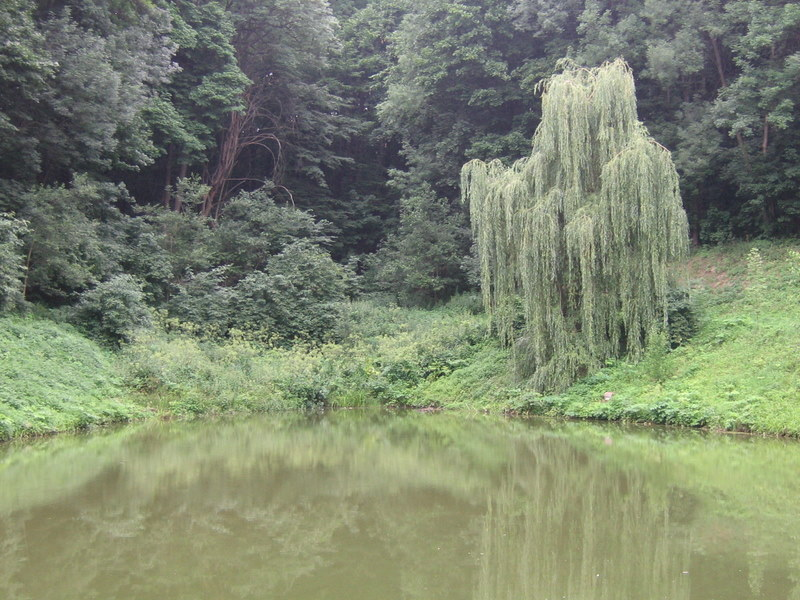

- Location within Cherkasy Oblast Location within Ukraine

Geography
- Location: Cherkasy Oblast, Ukraine
- Coordinates: 49°08′03″N 32°14′19″E
- Area: 6,804 ha (16,810 acres)

Kholodnyi Yar (Ukrainian: Холодний Яр, lit. 'Cold Gully/Ravine') is a relict forest area in the Cherkasy Oblast in Ukraine, which has historical and environmental significance.

Kholodnyi Yar ranks first in Ukraine in terms of the number of unique archaeological, historical, and scientific objects, and there are more than 150 of them here. The mounds of the Scythian period and later are scattered in the forest area and in the fields around it. In Kholodnyi Yar archaeologists have found traces of all archaeological cultures, starting with the Trypillian field culture, which originated in the forest-steppe zone of Ukraine 5-4 thousand years before the new era.

The mounds of the Scythian period and later are scattered in the forest area and in the fields around it. In Kholodnyi Yar archaeologists have found traces of all archaeological cultures, starting with the Trypillian field culture, which originated in the forest-steppe zone of Ukraine 5-4 thousand years before the new era.

The tract has an area of 6,804 hectares and is located within Cherkasy Raion in Cherkasy Oblast.

== Characteristics ==
The Forest Fund of the Kholodnyi Yar tract is mainly represented by highly productive plantings of artificial origin.

Of the 6,804 ha of the total area of the tract, 6,509 ha (95.7%) is covered with forest vegetation. In terms of species composition, oak plantations predominate here, 81% of the area.

=== Biota ===
About 150 species of herbaceous plants grow on the territory of the tract, among which there are rare plants listed in the Red Book of Ukraine.

=== Objects of the nature reserve fund ===
On 1 January 2022, the Kholodnyi Yar National Nature Park was created on the territory of the forest tract.

A significant part of Kholodnyi Yar — 561 hectares (8% of the area) — is included in the objects of the nature reserve fund, among which, the largest, covering an area of 553 hectares, is the nature monument of national significance "Kholodnyi Yar", created by order of the Council of Ministers of the Ukrainian SSR No. 1085 of 1 October 1968.

== Historical events ==
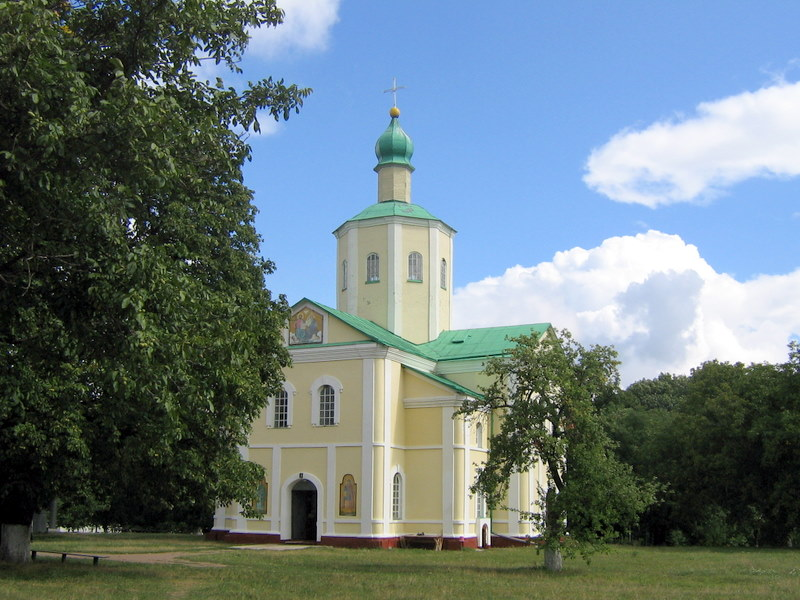
Trinity Church of the Motronynskyi Monastery

The first written mention of the Kholodnyi Yar belongs to historians who described the battles of Lithuanian and Kievan Rus' soldiers with the Horde in 1363-1367 on the "Blue Water".

Due to the dangerous proximity of the Wild Fields and the incessant attacks of nomadic tribes, these lands were uninhabited for a long time. Individual fortress cities and well-fortified monasteries for centuries were the only settlements from Kaniv and Cherkasy to the Dnieper rapids.

=== Haidamaka uprisings ===
In the 1730s Kholodnyi Yar Sich was organized in Kholodnyi Yar. This forest became the main base of the haidamaks for decades.

=== Kholodny Yar Republic ===
The 1919–1922 Kholodny Yar Republic was a self-proclaimed state and partisan movement based in Kholodnyi Yar.

== Literature ==
- Енциклопедія українознавства : Словникова частина : [в 11 т.] / Наукове товариство імені Шевченка; гол. ред. проф., д-р Володимир Кубійович. — Париж—Нью-Йорк : Молоде життя, 1955—1995.
- Джулай, Дмитро. Живі образи українського села: віднайдено унікальний фотоархів Івана Литвина // Радіо «Свобода», 12 грудня 202
- Довідник з історії України / за ред. І. З. Підкови, Р. М. Шуста. — К. : Генеза, 2001. — ISBN 966-504-439-7.
- Ушета І. І. Стежками Холодного Яру. Київ, 1988;
- Дубрава Ю. У Холодному Яру знову б'є цілюще джерело // Нова доба. — 2001. — 28 груд. — С.2;
- Лебідь І. У центрі п'яти ярів — колиска нашої волі // Нова доба. — 1999. — 2 лист. — с.4-5;
- Лисенко С. Холодний Яр стане національним парком // Молодь Черкащини. — 2000.- 16 листоп. — С.12
- Морозов А. Г. Холодний Яр // Енциклопедія історії України : у 10 т. / редкол.: В. А. Смолій (голова) та ін.; Інститут історії України НАН України. — К. : Наукова думка, 2013. — Т. 10 : Т — Я. — С. 408-410. — 784 с. : іл. — ISBN 978-966-00-1359-9.
- Негода М. Холодний яр: роман. К.: Рад. письменник, 1971;
- Книга Юрія Горліс-Горського про Холодноярську Республіку «Холодний Яр».
- Вєтров, О. В. Таємниця Холодного Яру. Невідома війна: національний рух опору у 1940-1950-х роках [Текст] / О. В. Вєтров. — Черкаси: Вертикаль; Видавець Кандич С. Г., 2009. — 266 с.
