= Chigirin uezd =

Chigirin uezd Чигиринский уезд
- Uezd
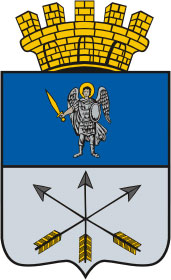
- Coat of arms

- Location in the Kiev Governorate
- Country: Russian Empire
- Krai: Southwestern
- Governorate: Kiev
- Established: 1795
- Abolished: 1923
- Capital: Chigirin

Area
  - Total: 3,274 km^{2} (1,264 sq mi)

Population (1897)
  - Total: 225,915
  - Density: 69.00/km^{2} (178.7/sq mi)

The Chigirin uezd (Russian: Чигиринский уезд, romanized: Chigirinskiy uyezd; Ukrainian: Чигиринський повіт, romanized: Chyhyryns'kyi povit) was one of the subdivisions of the Kiev Governorate of the Russian Empire. It was situated in the southeastern part of the governorate. Its administrative centre was Chigirin (Chyhyryn).

== Demographics ==
At the time of the Russian Empire Census of 1897, Chigirin uezd had a population of 225,915. Of these, 89.4% spoke Ukrainian, 8.6% Yiddish, 1.4% Russian, 0.3% Polish, 0.1% Belarusian and 0.1% Romani as their native language.
