= Ukrainian War of Independence =

Eastern European military conflict (1917–1921)

- Part of the Eastern Front of World War I, the Polish–Soviet War, and the Southern Front of the Russian Civil War
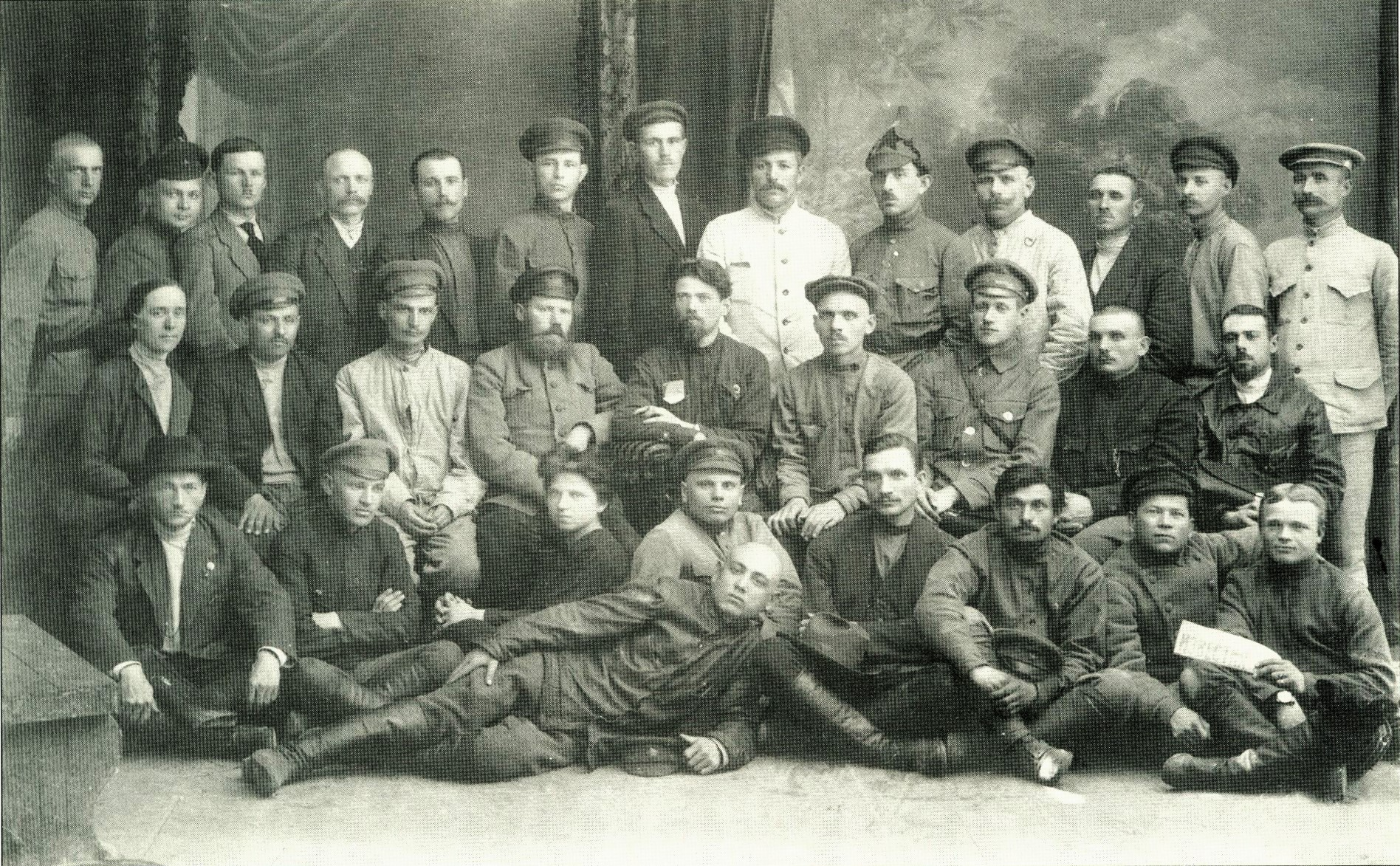
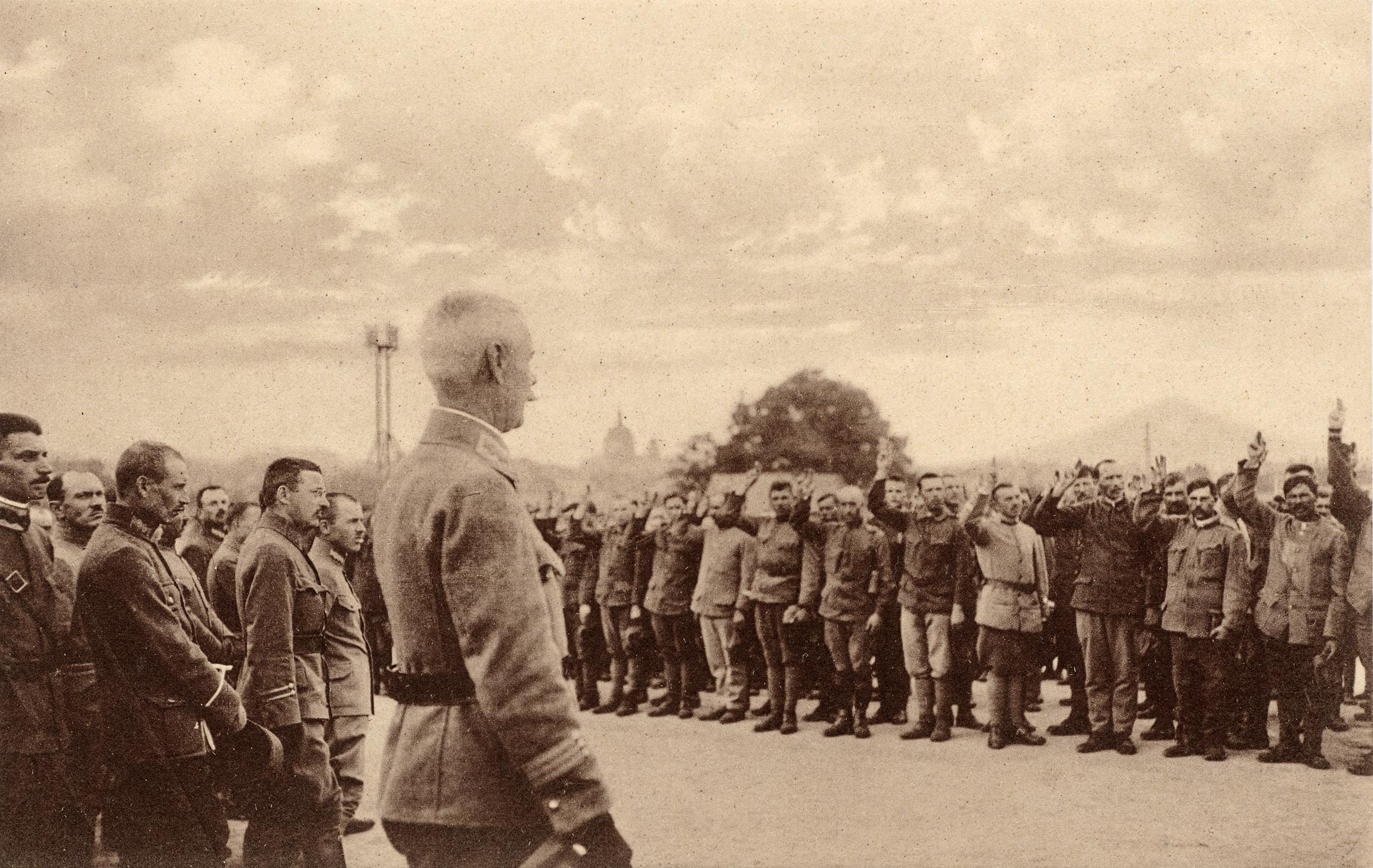
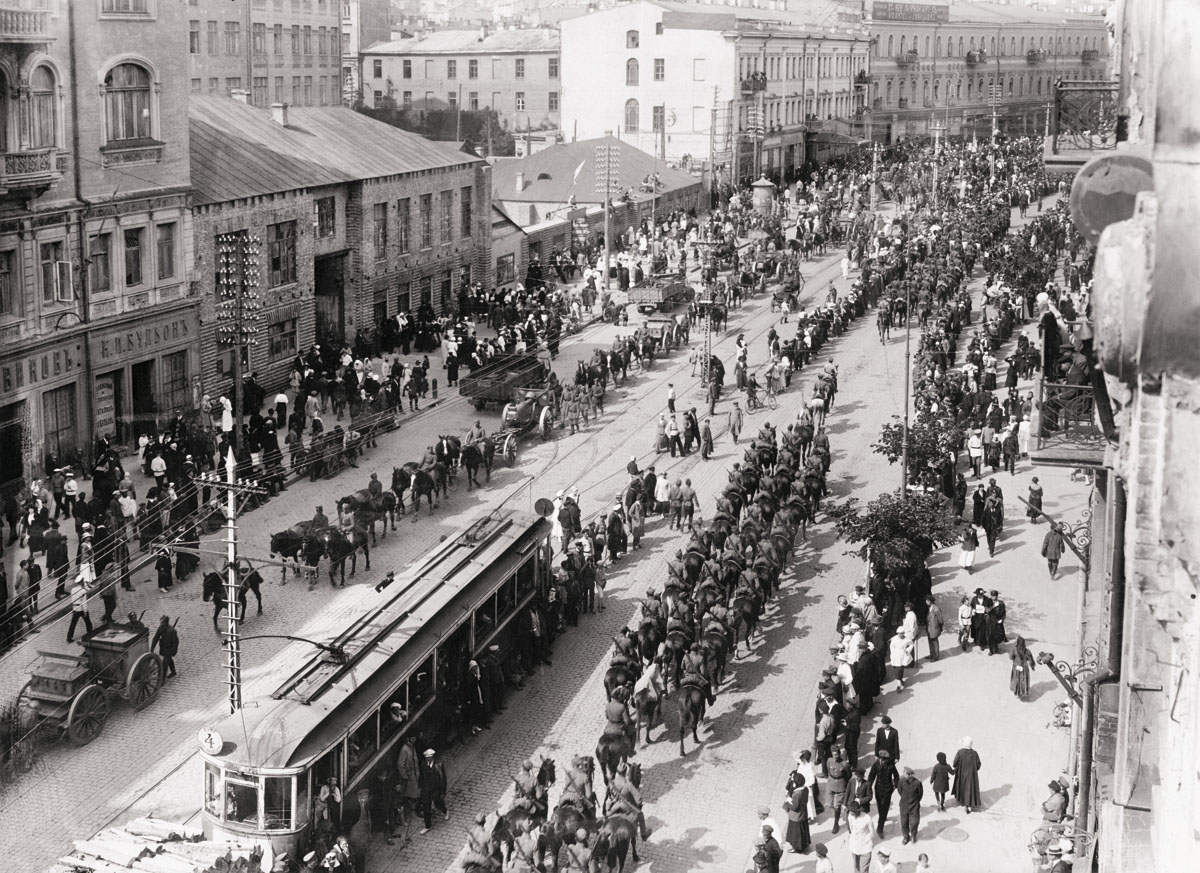
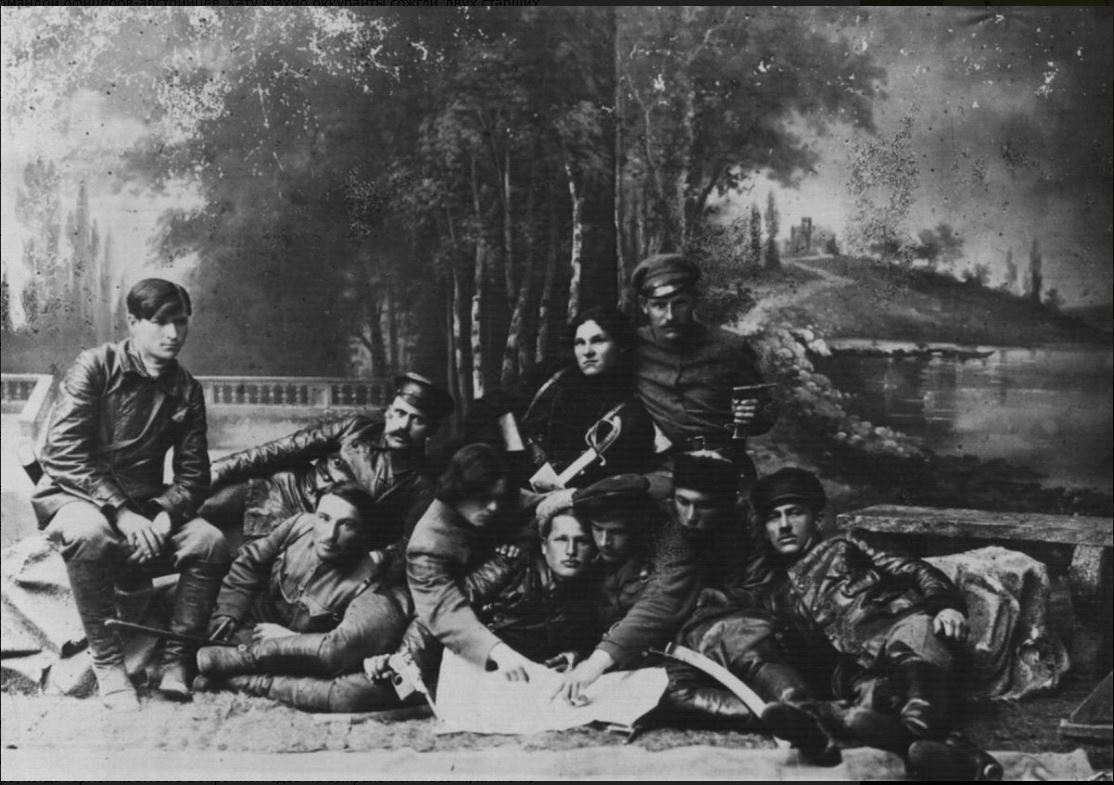
- (clockwise from top left): Members of the Yuzovka (Donetsk) First District Executive Committee in 1917; Ukrainian People's Republic soldiers swearing an oath in 1919; Anarchist Black Army command in Berdiansk in 1919; Polish troops in Kyiv in 1920.
Date	7 March 1917 – 17 November 1921 (4 years, 8 months, 1 week and 3 days)
Location	Ukrainian People's Republic
Result	Ukrainian defeat; Bolshevik victory in the Ukrainian–Soviet War; Polish victory in the Polish-Ukrainian War; Romania crushes Khotyn Uprising
Territorial changes	Partition and dissolution of the Ukrainian People's Republic; Most of Ukraine is conquered by the Red Army, resulting in the creation of the Ukrainian SSR; Poland conquers West Ukrainian People's Republic; Romania incorporates Northern Bukovina and the Budjak; Czechoslovakia annexes Transcarpathia

Belligerents
Ukrainian People's Republic; West Ukrainian People's Republic (1918–1919); Poland (from 1920); Supported by: Germany; Austria-Hungary (until April 1918)	Russian SFSR; UNRR; URR; Ukrainian SSR; Makhnovshchina; Green armies	Ukrainian State (1918) Supported by: Germany; Austria-Hungary (from April 1918); South Russia (from 1919): Poland (until 1919); Romania

Commanders and leaders
(Ukrainian People's Republic) Mykhailo Hrushevsky (Ukrainian People's Republic) Symon Petliura (Ukrainian People's Republic) Petro Bolbochan (executed) (Ukrainian People's Republic) Yevhen Konovalets (Ukrainian People's Republic) Oleksandr Udovychenko (Ukrainian People's Republic) Yuriy Tyutyunnyk (Ukrainian People's Republic) Marko Bezruchko (West Ukrainian People's Republic) Yevhen Petrushevych (West Ukrainian People's Republic) Sydir Holubovych (West Ukrainian People's Republic) Viktor Kurmanovych (West Ukrainian People's Republic) Myron Tarnavsky (West Ukrainian People's Republic) Mykhailo Pavlenko (West Ukrainian People's Republic) Oleksander Hrekov	(Ukrainian Soviet Socialist Republic) Vladimir Antonov-Ovseenko (Ukrainian Soviet Socialist Republic) Stanisław Kosior (Ukrainian Soviet Socialist Republic) Grigory Petrovsky (Ukrainian Soviet Socialist Republic) Christian Rakovsky (Russian Soviet Federative Socialist Republic) Alexander Yegorov (Russian Soviet Federative Socialist Republic) Mikhail Frunze (Makhnovshchina) Nestor Makhno (WIA) (Makhnovshchina) Fedir Shchus †; Nykyfor Hryhoriv X Danylo Terpylo †	(Ukrainian State) Pavlo Skoropadskyi; (Ukrainian State) Fedir Lyzohub; (Ukrainian State) Alexander Ragoza (executed); (Ukrainian State) Vyacheslav Lypynsky; Hermann von Eichhorn X; Eduard von Böhm-Ermolli; (South Russia (1919–1920)) Anton Denikin; (South Russia (1919–1920)) Pyotr Wrangel; Fyodor Arturovich Keller (executed); Vladimir Vitkovsky; Yakov Slashchov; (Second Polish Republic) Józef Piłsudski; (Second Polish Republic) Edward Rydz-Śmigły; (Kingdom of Romania) Ernest Broșteanu

Strength
Ukrainian People's Army: 300,000 (peak); Ukrainian Galician Army: 70,000 (peak)	Red Army Revolutionary Insurgent Army of Ukraine: 103,000 (peak); Green armies	Volunteer Army: 40,000 (peak) German Army: Polish Army: 190,000 (peak); Royal Romanian Army: 4,000 (peak)

The Ukrainian War of Independence, also referred to as the Ukrainian–Soviet War in Ukraine, lasted from March 1917 to November 1921 and was part of the wider Russian Civil War. It saw the establishment and development of an independent Ukrainian republic, most of which was absorbed into the Ukrainian Soviet Socialist Republic between 1919 and 1920. The Ukrainian Soviet Socialist Republic was one of the constituent republics of the Soviet Union between 1922 and 1991.

The war was fought between different governmental, political and military forces. Belligerents included Ukrainian nationalists, Ukrainian anarchists, the forces of Germany and Austria-Hungary, the White Russian Volunteer Army, and Second Polish Republic forces. They struggled for control of Ukraine after the February Revolution of 1917.

The war ensued soon after the October Revolution, when the Bolshevik leader Vladimir Lenin dispatched the Antonov's expeditionary group to Ukraine and Southern Russia.

The war resulted in the absorption of Ukrainian populations into the newly created Soviet Union and the Second Polish Republic. Soviet historical tradition viewed the Bolshevik victory as the liberation of Ukraine from occupation by the armies of Western and Central Europe, including that of Poland. Modern Ukrainian historians consider it a failed war of independence by the Ukrainian People's Republic against the Bolsheviks. The conflict can be viewed within the framework of the Southern Front of the Russian Civil War of 1917–1922, as well as the closing stage of the Eastern Front of World War I.

== Background ==
During the First World War, Ukraine was in the front lines of two of the main combatants, Imperial Russia and Austria-Hungary. During the war, Ukrainian activists in Russia were treated as enemy agents, and newspapers and cultural organisations were shut down by the authorities. The Austrians in turn persecuted Galician Russophiles, arresting them and their families. The region was cleared of Russophiles when Austria recaptured Galicia from the Russians later in the war.

In response to the February Revolution in March 1917, political and cultural organisations in Kyiv created a council, the Central Rada, and in April the 900 delegates elected Mykhailo Hrushevsky as its leader. Hrushevsky believed that the time had come for greater Ukrainian autonomy within Russia. That month, 100,000 supporters went on the streets of Kyiv in support of the Central Rada. The new government, which claimed jurisdiction over five Ukrainian governorates, was recognised as the government of Ukraine in Petrograd. Ukrainians from Moscow and Petrograd returned to Kyiv to aid the work of the new government.

The Central Rada was supported by Ukrainian officers and their men. Those at the front continued to fight for the Russians, but were keen to return home, following promises by the Central Rada that land would be redistributed. As it became clearer that such promises were never going to be fulfilled, many began to support the Bolsheviks. In the south of Ukraine, Nestor Makhno began his anarchist activity, disarming deserting Russian soldiers and officers. In the eastern Donets Basin there were frequent strikes by Bolshevik-infiltrated trade unions.

The Central Rada proclaimed four Universals, declaring Ukrainian autonomy on 23 June 1917 (stating that "Ukraine should have the right to order their own lives in their own land”), issuing recognition agreements between the Central Rada and the Provisional Government in Petrograd on 16 July, and announcing the creation of the Ukrainian People's Republic (UPR) on 20 November.

== Outbreak of fighting (1917–1918) ==
The Central Rada's authority didn't extend beyond the urban centres, and following the proclamations, it was faced with external attacks and an internal workers' uprising. The Central Rada lacked a disciplined standing army or state apparatus, and it had to appeal to the population to mobilise. In late December 1917 the Communist Party of Ukraine set up the rival Donetsk–Krivoy Rog Soviet Republic—initially also called the Ukrainian People's Republic—in the eastern city of Kharkiv, where Vladimir Antonov-Ovseenko had established his headquarters. Their intention was initially to cut off Alexey Kaledin's forces in the Don region from Ukraine. In January, the Bolsheviks moved through Ukraine, with the aim of taking Kyiv, and the Central Rada began to lose control of the urban centres as the workers' support for the Bolsheviks increased. The Odessa Soviet Republic, which was created on 18 January, was one of a number of temporary bodies formed by the Bolsheviks.

Bolshevik forces led by Mikhail Artemyevich Muravyov quickly took Poltava, followed by Yekaterinoslav on 10 January 1918, Zhmerynka and Vinnitsa on 23 January, Odesa on 30 January, and Nikolaev on 4 February. Slowed by the Battle of Kruty on 30 January — but aided by the Kiev Arsenal January Uprising, a Bolshevik-organized workers' armed revolt that started on 29 January — Kyiv was captured by the Bolsheviks on 9 February, following their victory in the Battle of Kiev. The Rada ministers retreated to Zhytomyr. Muravyov then engaged Romanians forces in Bessarabia.

Most of the remaining Russian Army units either allied with the Bolsheviks or joined the army of the Ukrainian People's Republic. A notable exception was the White Movement military leader Mikhail Drozdovsky, who marched his troops across Novorossiya to the Don to join forces with Mikhail Alekseev's Volunteer Army.

== Central Powers intervention ==
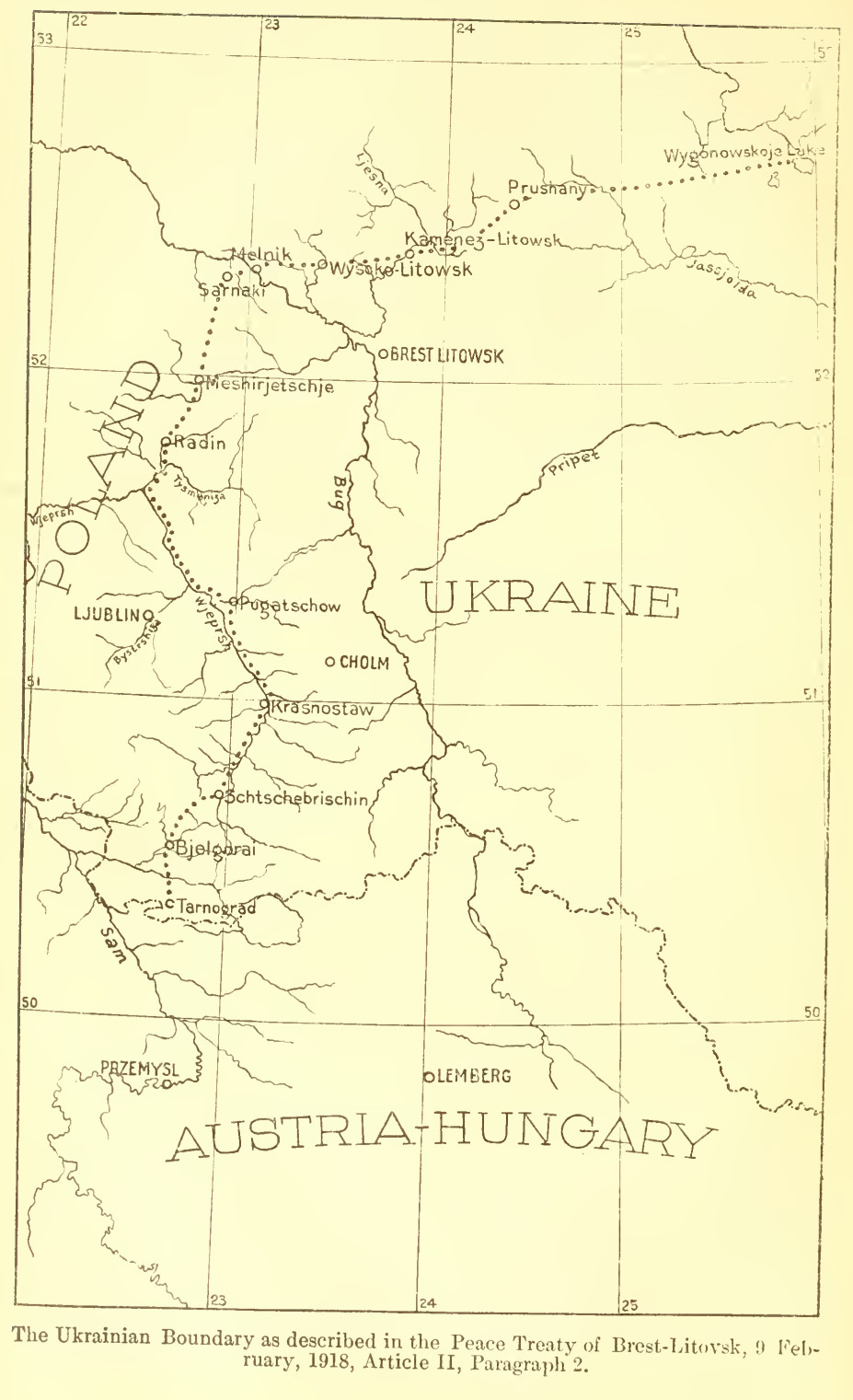
The north-western boundary of the UPR, as set by the first Treaty of Brest Litovsk

Following Bolshevik negotiations with the Central Powers at Brest-Litovsk on 3 December 1917, the Central Rada expressed its desire for peace, and on 28 December an armistice was signed.

On 12 January the Central Powers, recognized the UPR delegation. Independence of the UPR was proclaimed in the Fourth Universal on 25 January 1918. On 1 February the plenary session was attended by the Kharkiv ‘Soviet Ukrainian government. The first Treaty of Brest-Litovsk was signed on 9 February. In return for much needed food supplies and agricultural products, Germany and Austria promised to provide the UPR with military assistance against the Bolsheviks. The Allied Powers reacted against the treaty and suspended relations with the UPR. (Note: Austria-Hungary and the UPR secretly agreed to unify areas of eastern Galicia and Bukovyna where the Ukrainians predominated. But in July 1918 Austria annulled this agreement.) (Note: In 1922 the commitments made by the Central Powers were annulled.)

=== Expulsion of Bolshevik forces ===
The German and Austro-Hungarian armies then launched Operation Faustschlag, which resulted in the Bolshevik forces being driven out of Ukraine. Kyiv was taken on 1 March by a force of 450,000 German troops. Two days later the Bolsheviks signed the Treaty of Brest-Litovsk with the Central Powers, which formally ended hostilities on the Eastern Front. Russia agreed to recognize the previous UPR treaty, to sign a peace treaty with Ukraine, and to define the Russian/Ukrainian border.

On 13 March, Ukrainian troops and the Austro-Hungarian Army secured Odesa. The Ukrainian People's Army took control of the Donets Basin, and Crimea was cleared of Bolshevik forces in April 1918. Crimea, although occupied by the Germans, was not annexed by the UPR. Despite these victories, civil disturbances continued throughout Ukraine, where local communists, peasant self-defence groups, and insurgents refused to submit to the Germans.

=== Hetmanate (April – November 1918) ===
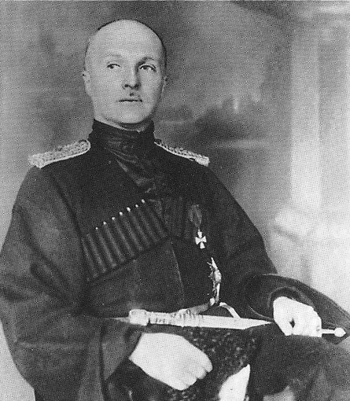
Pavlo Skoropadsky

On 28 April, the Central Rada was disbanded by the Germans, and the following day, a German-backed coup against the UPR government was staged. The Ukrainian State, with Pavlo Skoropadsky as its self-appointed Hetman of all Ukraine, then replaced the UPR. Skoropadsky annulled the previous legal status and all laws of the UPR. Under his government, new banks, government departments and a standing army were all created, and the Ukrainian language was introduced into schools. The Central Rada politicians refused to cooperate with Skoropadsky, and he was unpopular with the workers, who felt suppressed by the actions of his regime. A body known as the Directorate of Ukraine was formed to overthrow Skoropadsky's regime.

After the defeat of Germany on the Western Front in November 1918, most of the German troops stationed in Ukraine had no wish to remain there in support of the Hetmanate, Skoropadskyi, in an effort to appease the Allies, signed the Federal Charter, which stipulated that Ukraine would be part of a future federal Russia. An anti-Hetman Uprising on 14 November, led by the Ukrainian Social Democratic Labour Party, rose up against Skoropadsky, followed by an uprising on 16 November 1918 by the Directorate.

Skoropadskyi declared martial law, and mobilised his troops to quell the rebellion. The Directorate army initially succeeded in securing most of Ukraine, but were then decisively defeated by remaining German forces. The Siege Corps of the Sich Riflemen captured Kyiv after a two-week siege. Skoropadskyi chose to abdicate, fleeing to Germany, and his government surrendered to the Directorate the next day. On 14 December, the Directory's troops entered the city, taking over the institutions introduced by the Hetmanate.

== West Ukrainian People's Republic ==
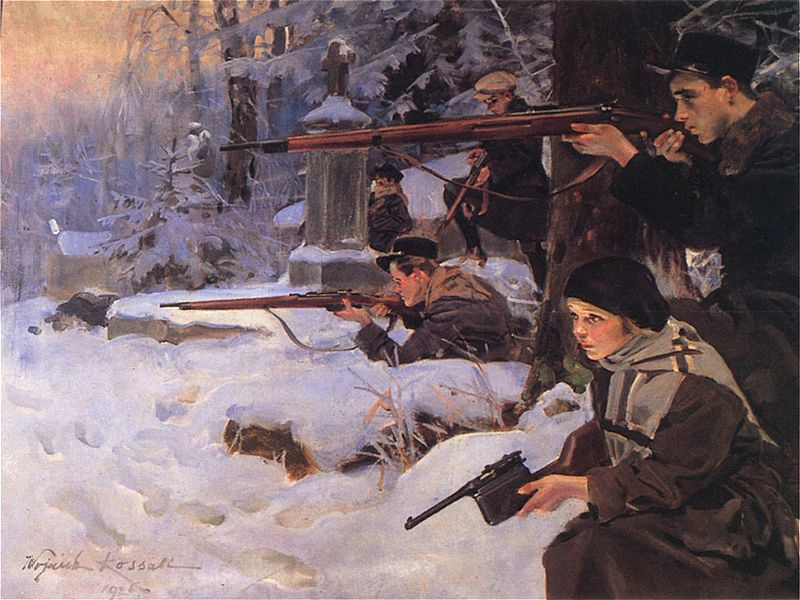
Wojciech Kossak, Eaglets – Defense of the Cemetery (1926). Lwów Eaglets depicted during the Siege of Lwów (Lviv). (Polish Army Museum)

In October 1918 Ukrainians announced the formation of the Western Ukrainian People's Republic (WUPR) from the Austrian territories of Galicia, Bukovina and Transcarpathia. As both the Ukrainians and the Poles claimed the region, the Polish–Ukrainian War started, when fighting broke out between Ukrainian forces and the Polish Military Organisation. On 1 November, Lviv fell to the West Ukrainians, but after it was retaken three weeks later by the Polish forces, the WUPR government moved to Ternopil and soon afterwards to Stanyslaviv. In January 1919, the two Ukrainian states decided to merge.

Simultaneously, the collapse of the Central Powers affected Galicia, which was populated by Ukrainians and Poles. The Ukrainians proclaimed a Western Ukrainian People's Republic (WUNR) in Eastern Galicia, which wished to unite with the UPR; while the Poles of Eastern Galicia—who were mainly concentrated in Lviv—gave their allegiance to the newly formed Second Polish Republic. Both sides became increasingly hostile with each other. On 22 January 1919, the Western Ukrainian People's Republic and the Ukrainian People's Republic signed an Act of Union in Kyiv. By October 1919, the Ukrainian Galician Army of the WUNR was defeated by Polish forces in the Polish–Ukrainian War and Eastern Galicia was annexed to Poland; the Paris Peace Conference of 1919 granted Eastern Galicia to Poland.

== Resumed hostilities (1919) ==
Almost immediately after the defeat of Germany, Lenin's government annulled the Treaty of Brest-Litovsk—which Leon Trotsky described as "no war no peace"—and invaded Ukraine and other countries of Eastern Europe that were formed under German protection.

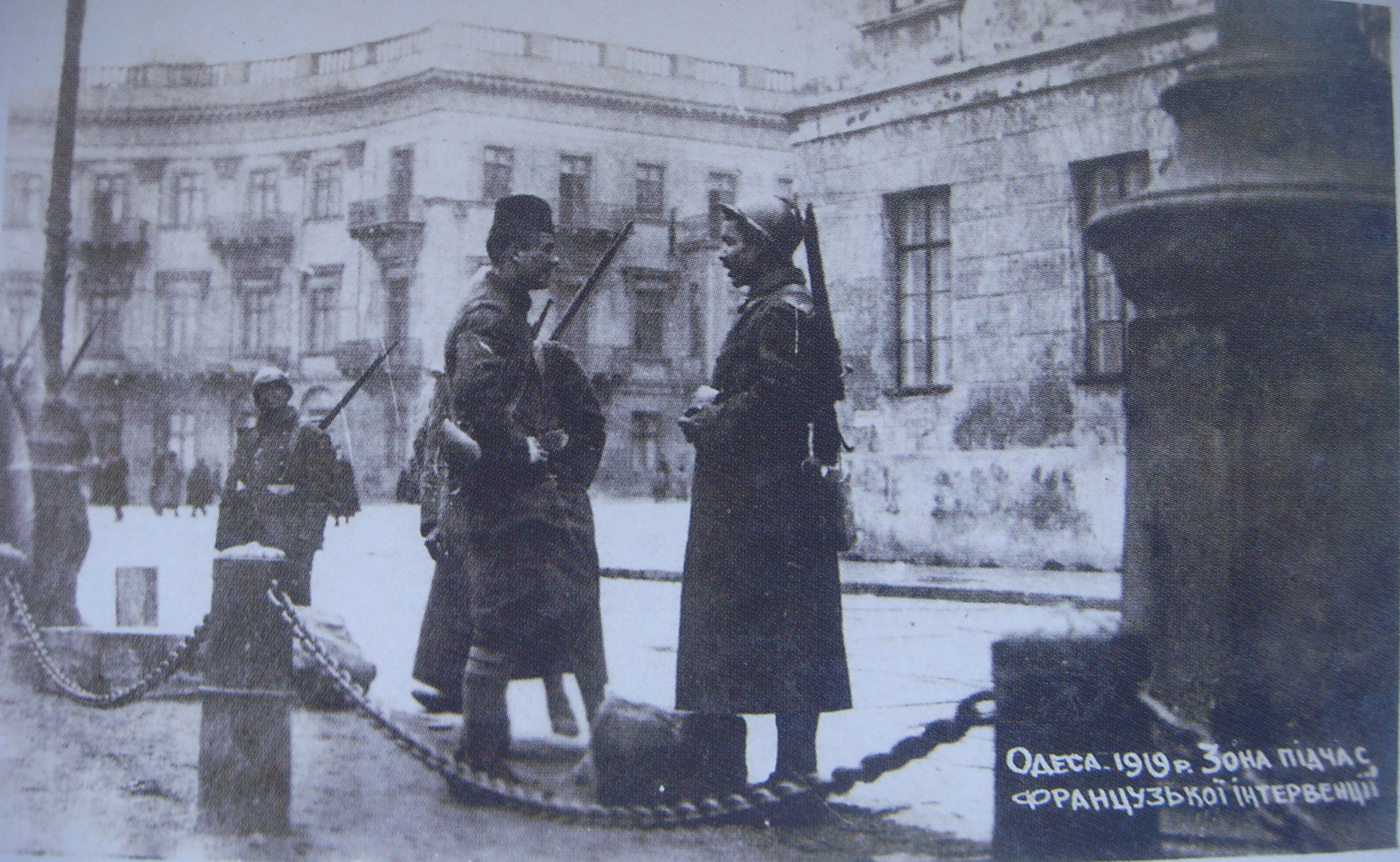
French troops in Odesa, 1919

The defeat of Germany had also opened the Black Sea to the Allies, and in mid-December 1918 some mixed forces under French command were landed at Odesa and Sevastopol, and months later at Kherson and Nikolayev (Ukrainian: Mykolaiv). Yet, on 2 April, Louis Franchet d'Espèrey ordered Philippe Henri Joseph d'Anselme to evacuate Odessa within 72 hours. Similarly, on 30 April, the French evacuated Sevastopol. According to Kenez, "The French withdrew not in order to avoid defeat, but in order to avoid fighting. They had no plans for evacuation. The French left behind enormous stores of military material. They embarked on an ambitious scheme without clear goals, without an understanding of the consequences and with insufficient forces."

A new, swift Bolshevik offensive overran most of Eastern and central Ukraine in early 1919. Kyiv—under the control of Symon Petliura's Directorate—fell to the Red Army again on 5 February, and the exiled Soviet Ukrainian government was re-instated as the Ukrainian Soviet Socialist Republic. The Ukrainian People's Republic (UPR) was forced to retreat into Eastern Galicia along the Polish border, from Vinnytsia to Kamianets-Podilskyi, and finally to Rivne. According to Chamberlin, April was the greatest Soviet military success in Ukraine, "The Soviet regime was now at least nominally installed all over Ukraina, with the exception of the portion of the Donetz Basin which was held by Denikin." Yet in May, the Soviets had to deal with the mutiny of Otaman Nykyfor Hryhoriv and the advance of Denikin's forces.

On 25 June 1919, Denikin's Armed Forces of South Russia captured Kharkov, followed by Ekaterinoslav on 30 June. According to Peter Kenez, "Denikin's advance in the Ukraine was most spectacular. He took Poltava on July 31, Odesa on August 23, and Kyiv on August 31."

By winter, the tide of war reversed decisively, and by 1920 all of Eastern and central Ukraine except Crimea was again in Bolshevik hands. The Bolsheviks also defeated Nestor Makhno.

== Polish involvement (1920) ==
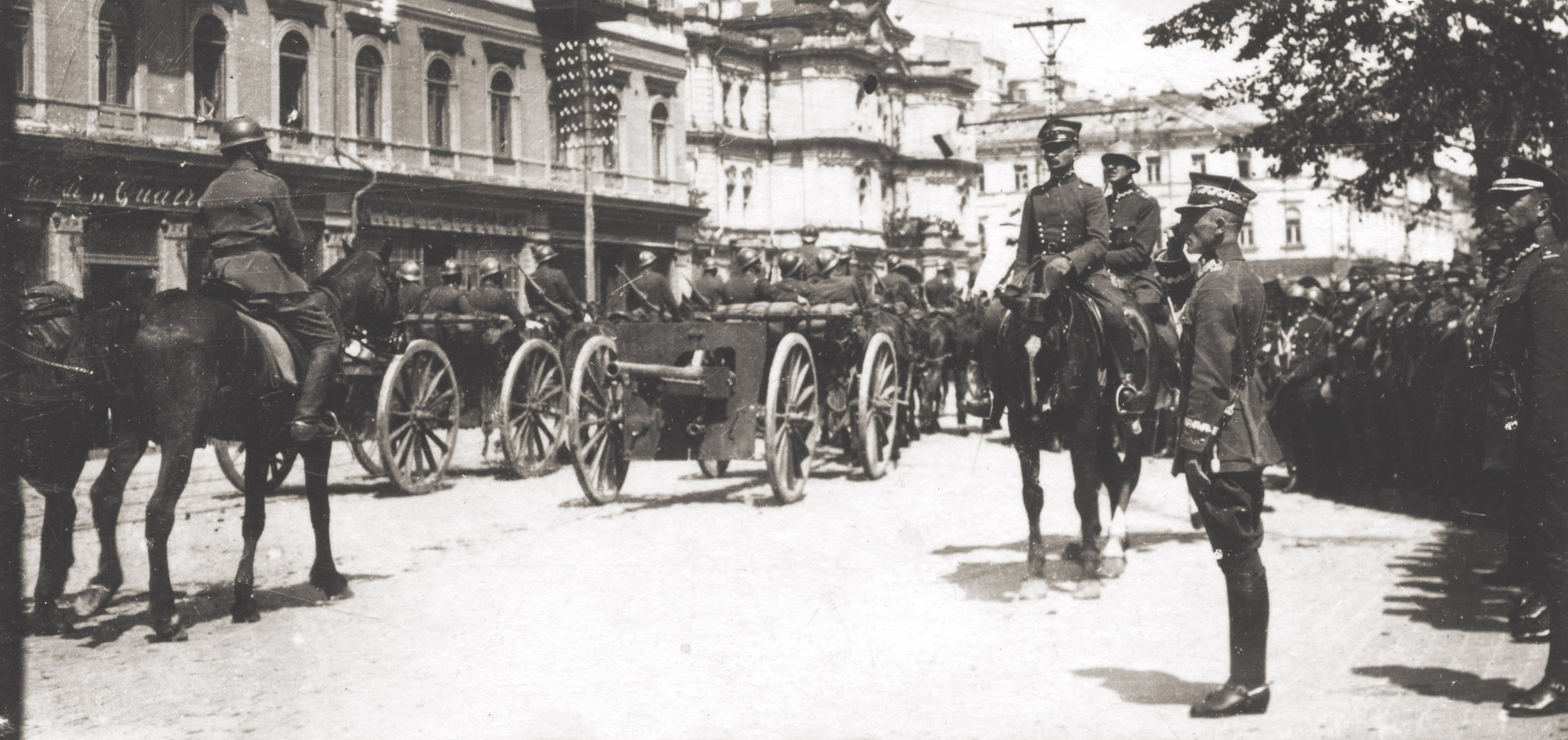
Edward Rydz-Śmigły saluting the Polish Army in the parade celebrating recent victory in the 1920 offensive, Kyiv, 8 May 1920

Again facing imminent defeat, the UPR turned to its former adversary, Poland; and in April 1920, Józef Piłsudski and Symon Petliura signed a military agreement in Warsaw to fight the Red Army together. Just like the former alliance with Germany, this move partially sacrificed Ukrainian sovereignty: Petliura recognised the Polish annexation of Galicia and agreed to Ukraine's role in Piłsudski's dream of a Polish-led federation in Central and Eastern Europe.

Immediately after the alliance was signed, Polish forces joined the Ukrainian army in the Kyiv offensive to capture central and southern Ukraine from Bolshevik control. Initially successful, the offensive reached Kyiv on 7 May 1920. However, the Polish-Ukrainian campaign ended in total failure: in late May, the Red Army led by Mikhail Tukhachevsky staged a large counter-offensive south of Zhytomyr which pushed the Polish army almost completely out of Ukraine, except for Lviv in Galicia. In yet another reversal, in August 1920 the Red Army was defeated near Warsaw and forced to retreat. The White forces, now under General Wrangel, took advantage of the situation and started a new offensive in southern Ukraine. Under the combined circumstances of their military defeat in Poland, the renewed White offensive, and disastrous economic conditions throughout the Russian SFSR—these together forced the Bolsheviks to seek a truce with Poland.

== End of hostilities (1921) ==
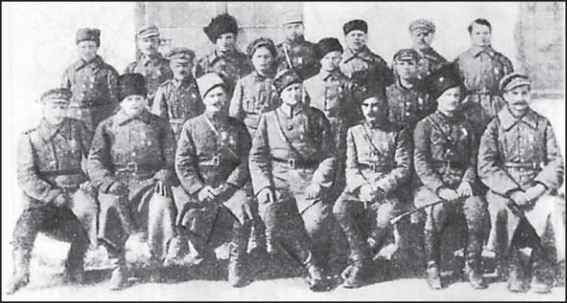
Ukrainian soldiers in Kalisz before the Second Winter Campaign, October 1921

Soon after the Battle of Warsaw the Bolsheviks sued for peace with the Poles. The Poles, exhausted and constantly pressured by the Western governments and the League of Nations, and with its army controlling the majority of the disputed territories, were willing to negotiate. The Soviets made two offers: one on 21 September and the other on 28 September. The Polish delegation made a counteroffer on 2 October. On the 5th, the Soviets offered amendments to the Polish offer, which Poland accepted. The Preliminary Treaty of Peace and Armistice Conditions between Poland on one side and Soviet Ukraine and Soviet Russia on the other was signed on 12 October, and the armistice went into effect on 18 October. Ratifications were exchanged at Liepāja on 2 November 1920. Long negotiations of the final peace treaty ensued.

Meanwhile, Petliura's Ukrainian forces, which now numbered 23,000 soldiers and controlled territories immediately to the east of Poland, planned an offensive in Ukraine for 11 November but were attacked by the Bolsheviks on 10 November. By 21 November, after several battles, they were driven into Polish-controlled territory.

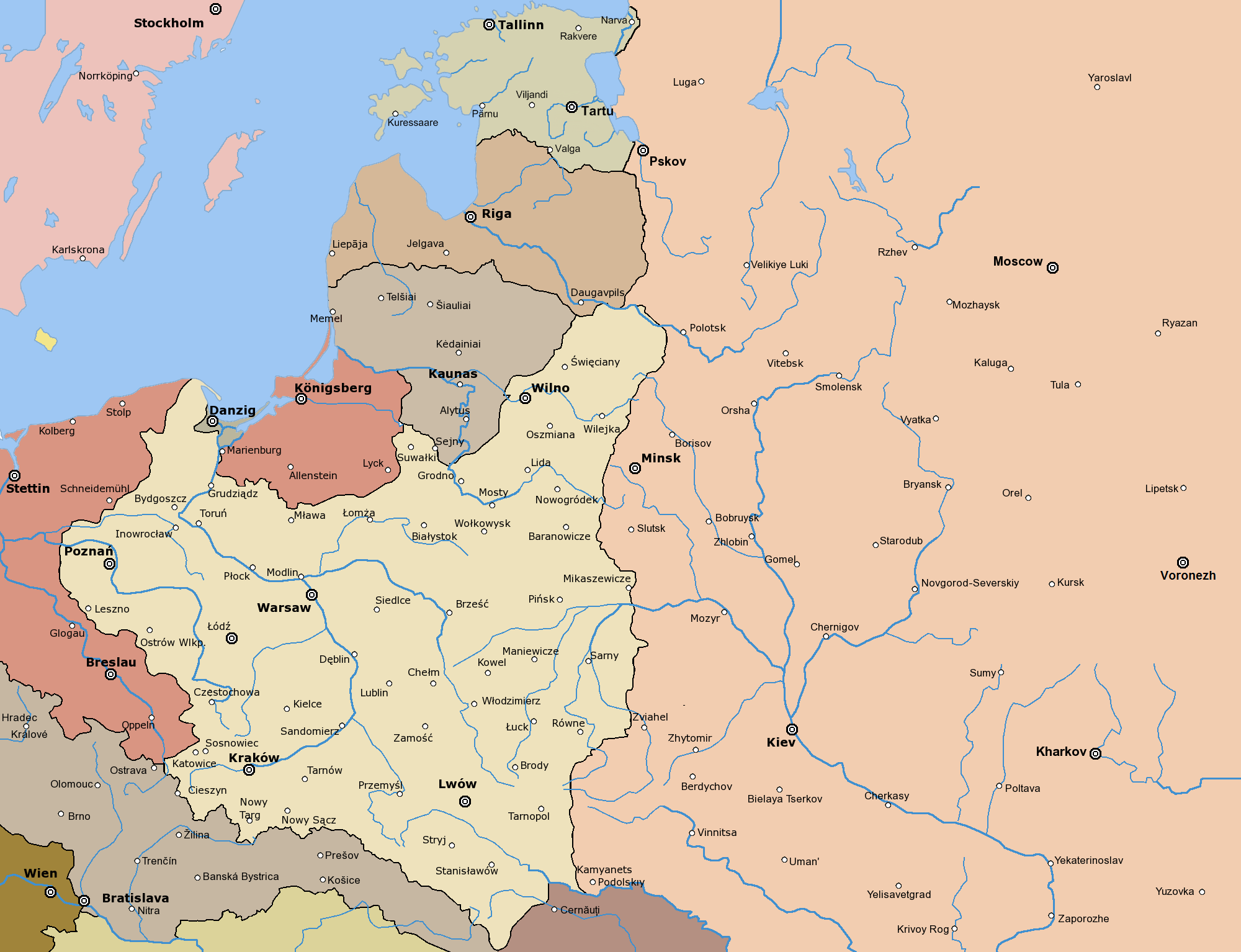
Polish-Soviet border in 1923 after the Peace of Riga

On 18 March 1921, Poland signed the Treaty of Riga with Soviet Russia and Soviet Ukraine. This effectively ended Poland's alliance obligations with Petliura's Ukrainian People's Republic. According to this treaty, the Bolsheviks recognized Polish control over Galicia (Ukrainian: Halychyna) and western Volhynia—the western part of Ukraine—while Poland recognized the larger central parts of Ukrainian territory, as well as eastern and southern areas, as part of Soviet Ukraine.

Having secured peace on the Western front, the Bolsheviks immediately moved to crush the remnants of the White Movement. After a final offensive on the Isthmus of Perekop, the Red Army overran Crimea. Wrangel evacuated the Volunteer Army to Constantinople in November 1920. After its military and political defeat, the Directorate continued to maintain control over some of its military forces; in October 1921, it launched a series of guerrilla raids into central Ukraine that reached as far east as the modern Kyiv Oblast. On 4 November, the Directorate's guerrillas captured Korosten and seized a cache of military supplies, but on 17 November 1921, this force was surrounded by Bolshevik cavalry and destroyed.

In the current Cherkasy Raion of Cherkasy Oblast (then in the Kyiv Governorate), a local man named Vasyl Chuchupak led the "Kholodnyi Yar Republic" which strove for Ukrainian independence. It lasted from 1919 to 1922, making it the last territory held by armed supporters of an independent Ukrainian state before the incorporation of Ukraine into the Soviet Union as the Ukrainian Soviet Socialist Republic.

== Aftermath ==
In 1922, the Russian Civil War was coming to an end in the Far East, and the Communists proclaimed the Union of Soviet Socialist Republics (USSR) as a federation of Russia, Ukraine, Belarus, and Transcaucasia. The Ukrainian Soviet government was nearly powerless in the face of a centralized monolith Communist Party apparatus based in Moscow. In the new state, Ukrainians initially enjoyed a titular nation position during the nativization and Ukrainization periods.

However, by 1928 Joseph Stalin had consolidated power in the Soviet Union. Thus a campaign of cultural repression started, cresting in the 1930s when a massive man-made famine afflicted the Soviet Union and claimed several million lives; the famine disproportionally affected Ukraine in what is known as the Holodomor. The Polish-controlled part of Ukraine was not affected by famine, though it had very little autonomy, both politically and culturally. In the late 1930s the internal borders of the Ukrainian SSR were redrawn with no significant changes.

The political status of Ukraine remained unchanged until the Molotov–Ribbentrop Pact between the USSR and Nazi Germany in August 1939, in which the Red Army allied with Nazi Germany to invade Poland and incorporate Volhynia and Galicia into the Ukrainian SSR. In June 1941, Germany and its allies invaded the Soviet Union and conquered Ukraine completely within the first year of the conflict. Following the Soviet victory on the Eastern Front of World War II, to which Ukrainians greatly contributed, the region of Carpathian Ruthenia—formerly a part of Hungary before 1919, of Czechoslovakia from 1919 to 1939, of Hungary between 1939 and 1944, and again of Czechoslovakia from 1944 to 1945—was incorporated into the Ukrainian SSR, as were parts of interwar Poland and Northern Bukovina, Khotyn and Southern Besserabia from Romania. The final expansion of Ukraine took place in 1954, when Crimea was transferred to Ukraine from Russia with the approval of Soviet leader Nikita Khrushchev.

== Popular culture ==
The war was portrayed in Mikhail Bulgakov's novel The White Guard, which was serialised in 1925.

Songs such as "Oi u luzi chervona kalyna" ("Oh, the guilder rose in the meadow, bent down") and "Hei vydno selo pid horoyu" ("Look, a village at the foot of the mountain") that were adapted or written for the Ukrainian Sich Riflemen, became widely popular in Ukraine at the time. Because of their patriotic content, they were banned by the Soviets during much of the 20th century.

== See also ==
- Bibliography of Ukrainian history
- Bibliography of the Russian Revolution and Civil War
- Outline of Ukrainian history
- List of states and regions involved in the Russian Civil War
- Outline of the Russian Revolution and Civil War
- Unification Act
- Ukrainian Death Triangle
- First Winter Campaign
- Second Winter Campaign
- Ukrainian Air Force
- Ukrainian People's Republic Air Fleet
- Navy of the Ukrainian People's Republic
- Russo-Ukrainian war (2014-present)
- Ukrainian liberation movement (1920–1950)
