= Ivan Chornousov =

Ukrainian military person

Ivan Yakovych Chornousov (Ukrainian: Іван Якович Чорноусов) was a participant in the Russian Civil War on the territories of what is now Kyiv and Poltava Oblasts in Ukraine. He is known for his fight against communists, that he believed supported or took part in the establishment of the power of the Soviet government on the territories of the emerging Ukrainian Republic from 1917 to 1923. Known as Chornyi Voron (from Ukrainian: Чорний Ворон, transl. "Black Raven"), he is a controversial figure; some consider him to be a national hero, others consider him to be a bandit and murderer.

== Sources ==
- http://2000.net.ua/2000/svoboda-slova/rezonans/72245
- http://ukrlife.org/main/evshan/reness3.htm
- http://ukrlife.org/main/evshan/zapovit8.htm
- http://www.nezboryma-naciya.org.ua/show.php?id=202
- https://web.archive.org/web/20100903111354/http://www.ukrnationalism.org.ua/publications/?n=927
- http://www.kavkazweb.net/forum/viewtopic.php?t=34797&sid=f2e93cfd11004db4ad9460dfbfd96f1f
- https://web.archive.org/web/20080324051549/http://disser.com.ua/contents/p-3/29049.html
- http://www.dt.ua/3000/3150/35845/
- http://www.personal-plus.net/498/9695.html
