= Kateryna (poem) =

Poem by Taras Shevchenko

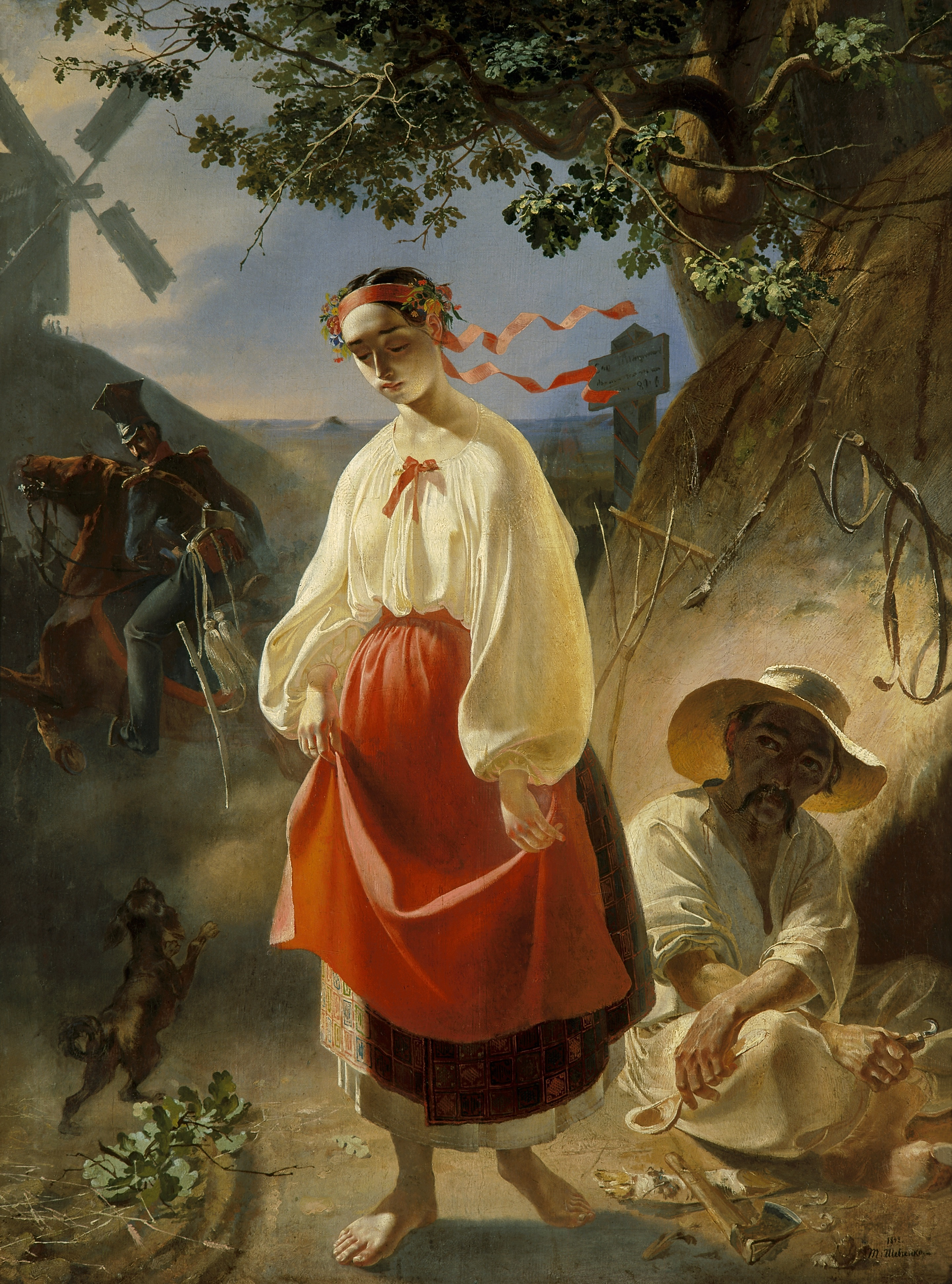
Kateryna, an oil painting created by Shevchenko in 1842 to illustrate his own poem

"Kateryna" (Ukrainian: «Катерина») is a poem by Taras Shevchenko, first published in his poetry collection Kobzar in 1840. It describes the tragic fate of a common Ukrainian girl who was seduced and later abandoned by a Russian soldier. The poem is frequently understood as an allegory of Ukraine's subjugation by Russian imperial power during its author's lifetime.

== Creation ==
According to the memoirs of Shevchenko's friend Ivan Soshenko, the poem was composed between November 1838 and February 1839, during the time when both men shared a flat on Vasilyevsky Island in Saint Petersburg. It is possible, that its creation was influenced by the novella Poor Oksana by Hryhorii Kvitka-Osnovianenko, which is based on a similar plot and whose text had been prepared for print by Shevchenko's close acquaintance and fellow Ukrainian poet Yevhen Hrebinka. Other possible influences include Nikolay Karamzin's Poor Liza and Eda by Yevgeny Baratynsky. According to Shevchenko himself, the poem was inspired by a real-life situation, which took place in the Ukrainian city of Nizhyn and led to the expulsion of a girl from her parents' house.

== Composition ==
The poem is dedicated to Russian poet Vasily Zhukovsky, who played a big role in Shevchenko's liberation from serfdom. Its first stropha has parallels in Ukrainian folklore and warns young girls against falling in love with Muscovites, with the term being used by the author in two meanings - soldiers of the Russian army and ethnic Russians. After seducing Kateryna, the main heroine of the poem, the Russian soldier leaves her to take part in a war against the Turks, leaving the girl with an illegitimate child. As a result, according to traditional views of Ukrainian society, Kateryna is seen by her family and neighbours as dishonourable, and is eventually expelled from the village together with her son. Hoping to find her former lover, Kateryna walks in the direction of Moscow and finally meets a group of soldiers including her child's father. However, the Muscovites ridicule Kateryna, and her former lover pretends not to recognize her. Desperate, Kateryna leaves her infant son on the road and drowns herself in a nearby pond. In the epilogue to the poem it is revealed that Ivan, the main heroine's illegitimate child, grew up to become a guide boy for an itinerant kobzar. As his father, now a nobleman, travels to Kyiv, he recognizes Ivan from the window of his carriage, but still refuses to accept him as a member of his family.

== English translations ==
Several translations of the poem into English exist. In 2019 an illustrated version of the poem was issued in Kyiv by the Osnovy publishing house, based on a mid-20th century English translation by John Weir.
