= The Island of Bornholm =

- Short story by Nikolai Karamzin

Text available at Russian Wikisource
- Original title: Остров Борнгольм
- Translator: Harold B. Segal
- Country: Russia
- Language: Russian
- Genre: Gothic fiction

Publication
- Publication date: 1794
- Published in English: 1967

"The Island of Bornholm" (Russian: Остров Борнгольм, romanized: Ostrov Borngolm) is a short story by Russian author Nikolai Karamzin, first published in 1794 in the first number of Karamzin's almanac Aglaya. It is considered the first Gothic story in Russian literature. The story is told in the first person from the perspective of an educated Russian nobleman returning home from England, implied to be the same narrator as that of Karamzin's quasi-autobiographical Letters of a Russian Traveler. The curious narrator explores the Danish island of Bornholm and unravels a mystery about two misfortunate lovers with a "terrible secret", which is left unsaid but is implied to be incest.

== Plot ==
The story is told in the first person from the perspective of an educated Russian nobleman returning home from England (implied to be the same narrator as that of Karamzin's quasi-autobiographical Letters of a Russian Traveler). After his ship makes a stop in Gravesend, he encounters a young man with a deathly appearance who sings a song in Danish about a past love which "laws condemn" and a "parental curse" which forced him to leave his home; the singer also mentions the island of Bornholm. The narrator's ship sets out and eventually arrives at Bornholm. The narrator's curiosity is aroused, and despite the captain's warnings of danger, he decides to go ashore and explore the island. While a local boy shows him around, he notices an old castle and decides to approach it, although his guide is afraid. The narrator hears a voice from the castle and asks to be let in. A tall man in black emerges and guides him into the castle, taking him to an old man. The old man is friendly to the narrator and the two have a conversation about the state of the world and the history of the island and "northern peoples". The narrator stays the night at the castle and sees ominous dreams. The next day, he comes across a young woman imprisoned in a cave. The narrator asks why she has been put there. The imprisoned woman expresses remorse but does not tell the narrator what she has done. She asks him to leave. Shaken by this scene, the narrator falls asleep outside. He awakes to see that the old man and his servant have discovered what has happened. The old man tells him the tragic story of the young woman imprisoned in the cave, although this is not told to the reader. The narrator reveals only that he discovered the "terrible secret" of the singing stranger from Gravesend. The saddened narrator leaves Bornholm.

== Style, themes, and analysis ==
The central conflict of the story is expressed in terms of an opposition between human law and natural law: the lovers suffer misfortune for their natural love which is proscribed by laws. The forbidden love between the singing Dane and the imprisoned woman is implied to be incest, although this is never explicitly stated. (In another redaction of the story which remained unknown until the twentieth century, it is specified that the two are brother and sister.) According to Derek Offord, the "dark secret" of the story reflects contemporary anxieties about vice overcoming morality and the "seemingly unresolvable conflict" between rationality and emotion. Offord also places the story in the context of contemporary Russian literary debates, occurring mainly between advocates of the Classicist and Sentimentalist styles. Karamzin belonged to the latter movement. However, Offord notes that the narrator of "The Island of Bornholm", while having the same sensibility as those of Letters of a Russian Traveler and Karamzin's previous sentimental short stories such as "Poor Liza", displays a "broader, more troubling spiritual disturbance". He connects this with events in Karamzin's personal life and with the recent violent turn of the French Revolution, which raised "fears about the extinction of enlightenment and humanist values".

"The Island of Bornholm" is considered the first Gothic story in Russian literature. Gothic elements in the work include the enigmatic and foreign setting, with its cliffs, tumultuous sea, and ominous castle, and the "terrible secret" hidden on the island. However, the work breaks with Gothic conventions in some ways. While Gothic fiction is usually plot-driven, Karamzin gives precedence to the subjective experiences of the narrator rather than to the events of the plot; in this regard, the story is similar to Karamzin's other early works. Another example of a break with conventional Gothic style is the cordial conversation between the narrator and the old man, which breaks the suspense of the narrative. In this passage, the old man asks the narrator to tell him about the state of the world. Using symbols characteristic of Enlightenment, the narrator states that, while science continues to spread, there is still bloodshed. Offord and Vadim Vatsuro see this passage as an expression of Karamzin's internal conflict of values caused by the French Revolution. The old man then finds out that the narrator is Russian and begins to speak of the historical presence of Slavs on Bornholm and the nearby island of Rügen. In Vatsuro's view, Karamzin uses the character of the old man to represent the false ideas about virtue of his time; the evocation of the medieval past serves to emphasize the old man's connection with "medieval barbarity", represented by the harsh punishment he inflicts on the imprisoned woman. Offord argues that this passage serves to elevate Russia and distinguish it from the "Gothic horrors" embodied by Bornholm and from the social upheavals of the period; Russians, though a northern people like the locals, "enjoy pride of place by virtue of their spiritual heritage". Sobol, on the other hand, believes that the passage suggests more connectedness than distinction between Russians and the locals, achieving an uncanny effect through an unexpected revelation of kinship; she explains, "by learning about the island's past and the secret it harbors, our traveler discovers something about his own culture's historical past." She adds that evocation of the historical kinship between the Danish island and Russia may reflect "contemporary anxieties over Russia's uncertain origins", specifically the Scandinavian origin of the first ruling dynasty of Russia.

== Translations ==
"The Island of Bornholm" has been translated into English twice: by Ηarold B. Segal for the book The Literature of Eighteenth Century Russia (vol. 2, New York, 1967), and by Henry M. Nebel Jr., for Selected Prose of Ν. M. Karamzin (Evanston, Illinois, 1969).
