= Kobzar (poetry collection) =

1840 Ukrainian-language poetry collection by Taras Shevchenko

The Complete Kobzar
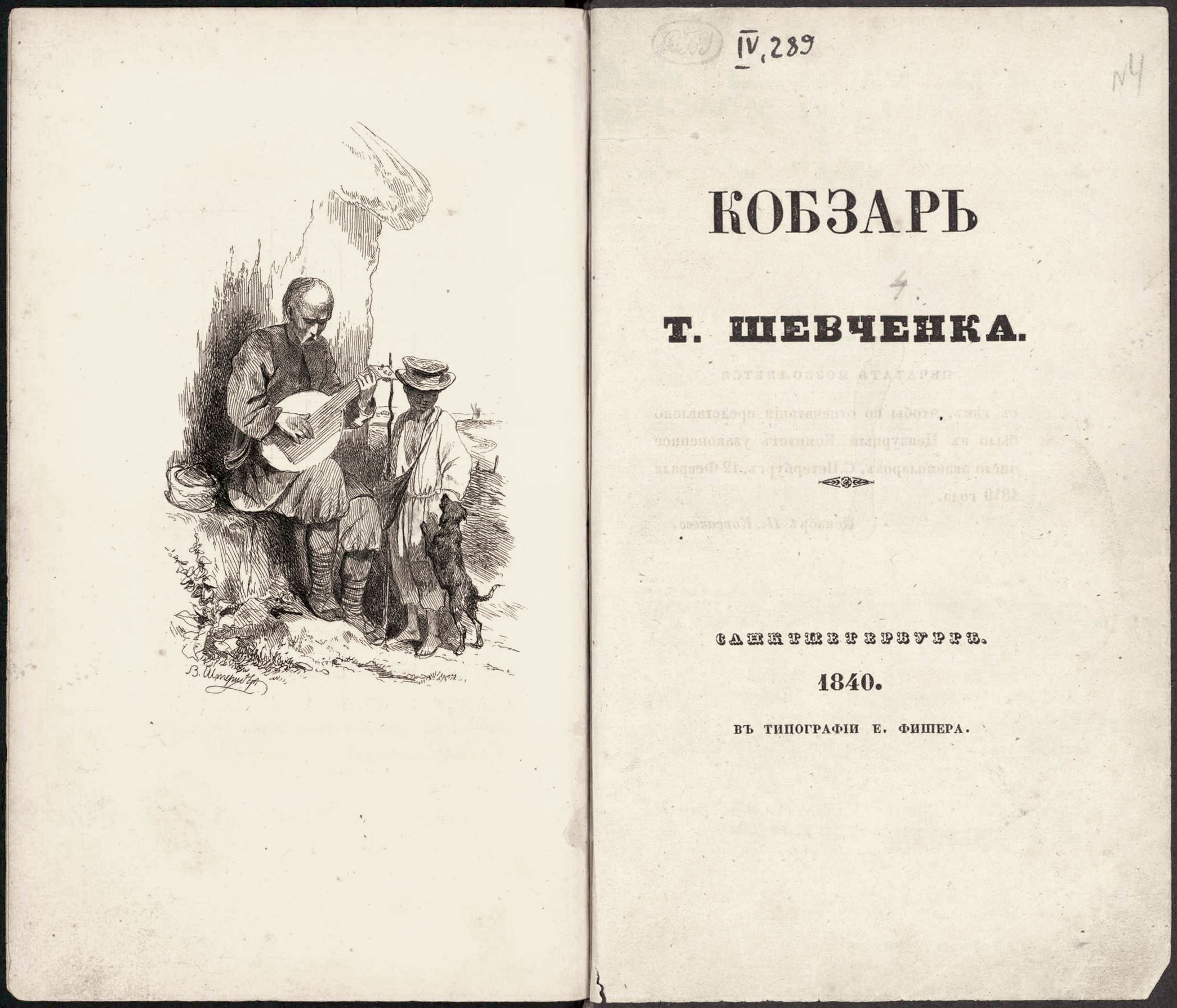
- Kobzar 1840 edition cover
- Author: Taras Shevchenko
- Original title: Кобзар
- Translator: Peter Fedynsky
- Language: Ukrainian
- Genre: Poems
- Publisher: E.Fisher typography (in Ukrainian), Glagoslav Publishers (in English)
- Publication date: 1840 (first 8 poems)
- Publication place: Russian Empire; USA
- English publication date: 2013
- Media type: Hardcover/paperback
- Pages: 412
- ISBN: 978-1909156548 /978-1909156555

Kobzar (Ukrainian: Кобзар, lit. '"The bard"') is a book of poems by Ukrainian poet and painter Taras Shevchenko, first published by Shevchenko in 1840 in Saint Petersburg, Russian Empire. Shevchenko, born in Moryntsi, Kyiv Governorate, in what is now Ukraine, was nicknamed The Kobzar (also the name of a Ukrainian social role) after the publishing of this collection. From that time on this title has been applied to Shevchenko's poetry in general and acquired a symbolic meaning of the Ukrainian national and literary revival.

The first publication consisted of eight poems: "Думи мої, думи мої, лихо мені з вами" (My thoughts, my thoughts, you are my doom), "Перебендя" (Perebendya), "Катерина" (Kateryna), "Тополя" (Poplar tree), "Думка" (Thought), "Нащо мені чорні брови" (Why should I have Black Eyebrows), "До Основ'яненка" (To Osnovyanenko), "Іван Підкова" (Ivan Pidkova), and "Тарасова ніч" (Taras's night).

There were three editions of the Kobzar during Shevchenko's lifetime, with the editions published in 1840, 1844, and in 1860. The last two editions included Hajdamaki, another famous poem by Taras Shevchenko, published in 1841. The 1844 edition was entitled as Чигиринський Кобзар і Гайдамаки ("Chyhyryn Kobzar and Hajdamaki" or "Kobzar of Chyhyryn and Hajdamaki").

Censorship in the Russian Empire prompted publication of Shevchenko's poetry in lands outside the Russian Empire's control, such as in Prague (now in the Czech Republic) or editions in areas that are now German.

== Significance of the term, "kobzar" ==
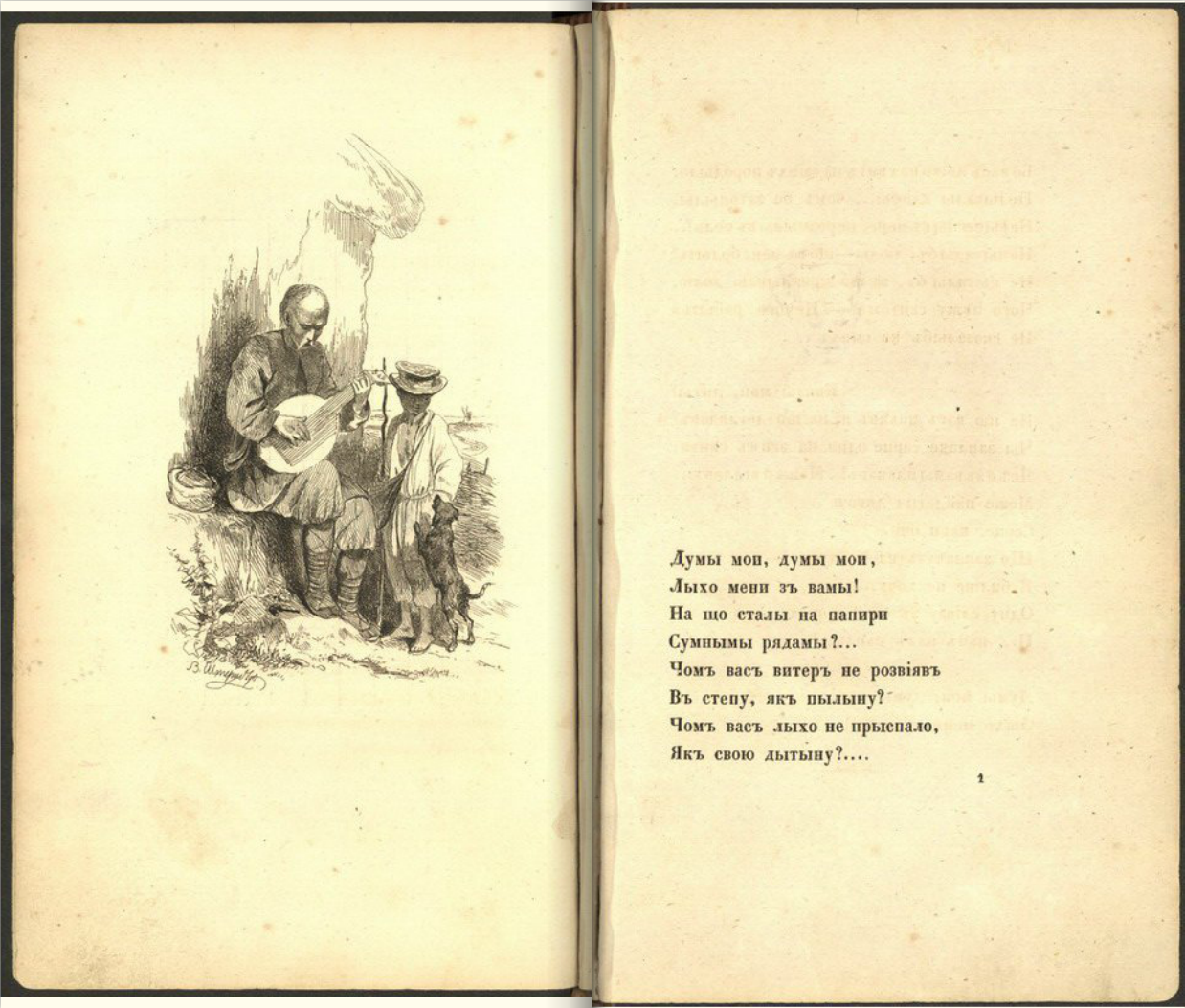
Kobzar illustration from first edition (1840)

=== Minstrel ===
Literally, kobzar in Ukrainian means a bard, although not a regular one, but rather one who both sings and plays on a musical instrument, such as a kobza (or a similar instrument, a bandura). A kobza is roughly similar to a lute. By extension, a kobzar is considered to be a bard or minstrel who plays the kobza, and beyond being a mere musician was a historical social institution that served a key function in preserving Ukrainian history and identity, contributing to communication between villages, and providing a dignified form of social welfare. Kobzari sang and performed epic poetic songs, called dumy.

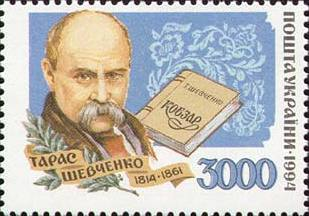
Shevchenko and Kobzar, 1994 stamp of Ukraine

=== Poet ===
In contemporary Ukrainian, the word, Kobzar, is also associated with the famous Ukrainian poet Taras Shevchenko, who was given Kobzar as a nickname.

=== Book ===
The complete collection of Ukrainian poems by Taras Shevchenko is also called Kobzar, the title of Shevchenko's first book of the same name.

== Publications in Shevchenko's lifetime ==
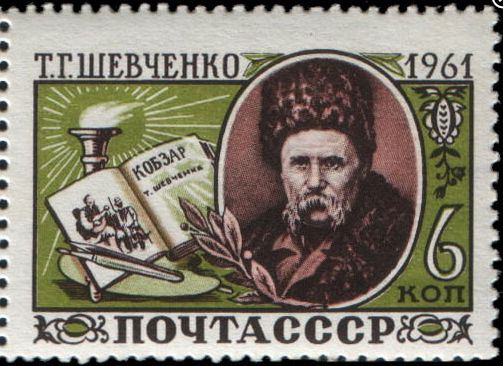
Kobzar and Shevchenko on a 1961 USSR stamp, 100 year anniversary of Shevchenko's death.

=== Comprehensive editions ===
==== The first edition ====
The first edition of "Kobzar" was printed in the private printing house of EF Fischer in St. Petersburg (Russia) with a circulation of 1,000 copies. Of these, the first 100 copies had 115 pages of text, but most of them, after the intervention of the censor, were removed and destroyed before the sale, and about ten, which Taras Shevchenko gave to friends — remained. Currently, the only known copy which has 115 pages of text that belonged to Taras Shevchenko and was confiscated from him during his first arrest, is kept in St. Petersburg (Russia), and the remaining books have 114 pages.

The first edition of "Kobzar" included eight early works:

- "My thoughts, my thoughts, woe is me with you!"
- "Perebendya",
- "Katerina",
- "Poplar",
- "Thought" (Why do I have black eyebrows...),
- "To Osnovyanenko",
- "Ivan Pidkova",
- "Tarasova night".

Six of them were dedicated.

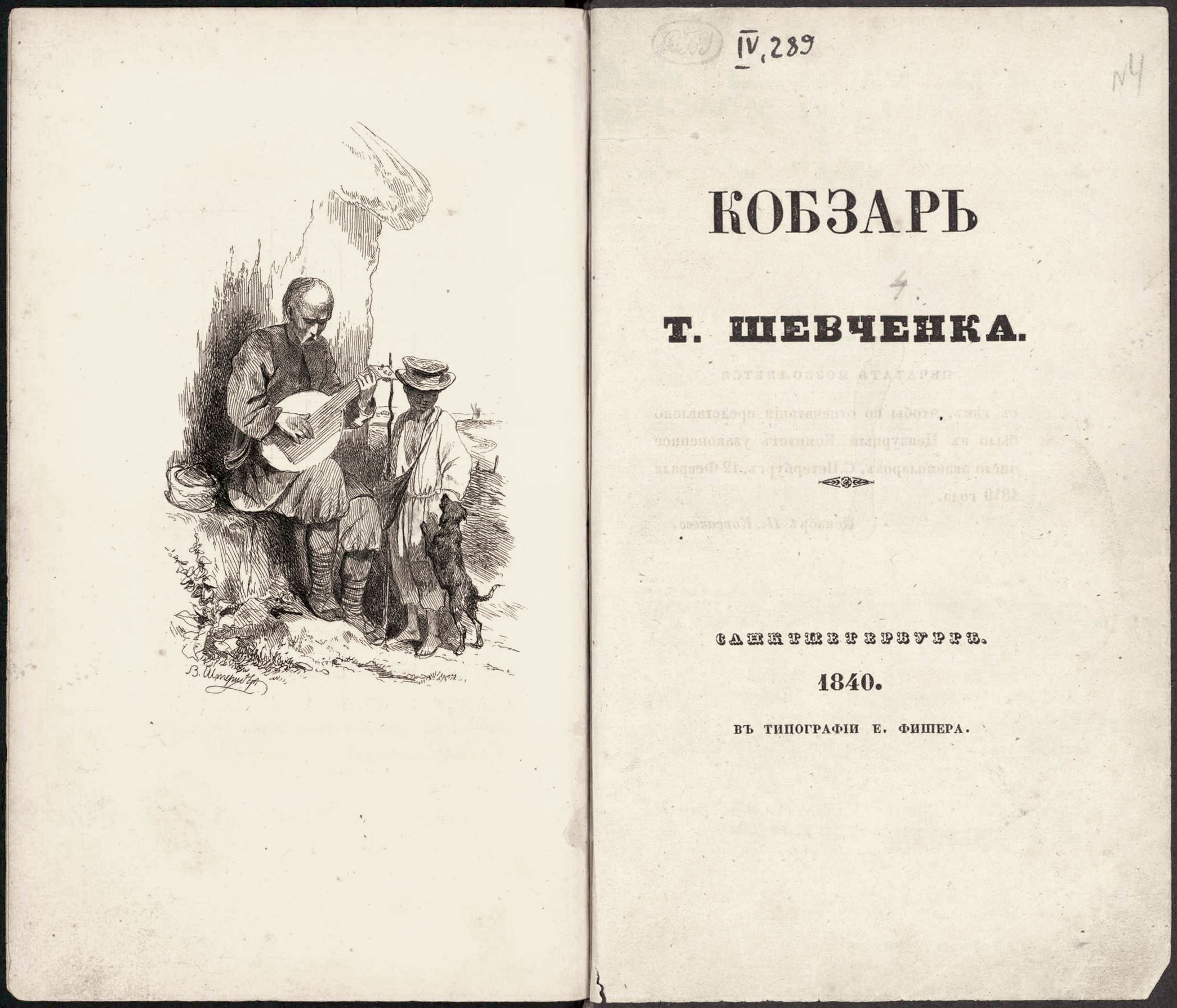
Kobzar, 1840 edition

Of all the lifetime editions of the works, the first "Kobzar" had the most attractive appearance: high-quality paper, convenient format, clear font. A notable feature of this "Kobzar" is the etching at the beginning of the book by Vasyl Sternberg: the folk singer is a kobzar with a boy-guide. This is not an illustration of a separate work, but a generalized image of a kobzar, which gave the name to the collection. The release of this "Kobzar", even interrupted by tsarist censorship, is an event of great literary and national significance.

==== Second edition ====
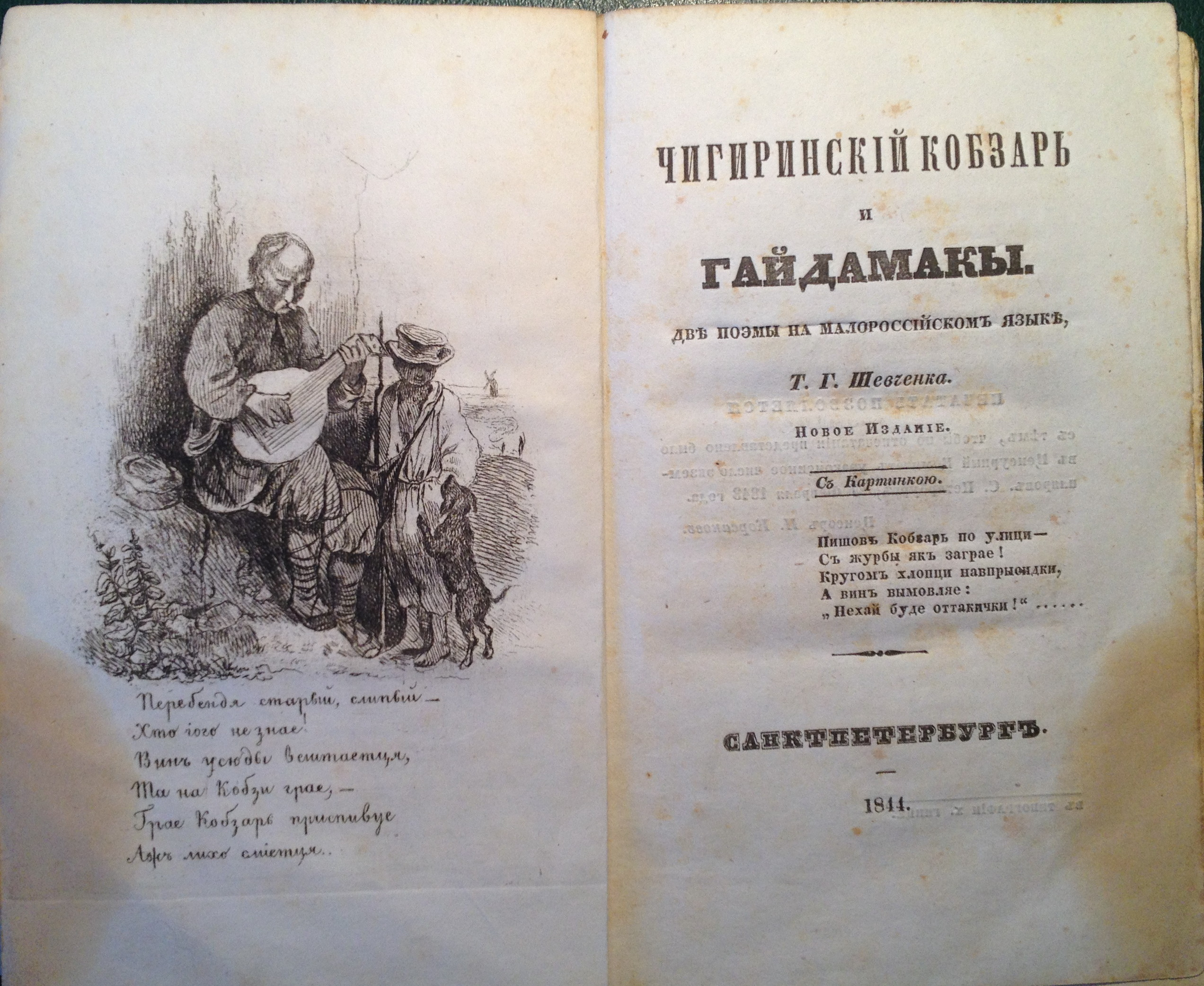
Kobzar, 1844 edition

In 1844, under the title "Chyhyryn Kobzar", a reprint of the first edition of "Kobzar" was published with the addition of the poem "Haydamaky".

===== Kobzar banned and confiscated; Shevchenko arrested =====
After the arrest of Taras Shevchenko in 1847, the Kobzar was banned in the Russian Empire and confiscated from libraries and bookstores, as well as from individual citizens, which made this publication rare during the poet's lifetime. Only a few copies of Taras Shevchenko's first edition Kobzar of 1840 have survived in the world. One of them (114 pages) is stored in the National Library of Ukraine named after Vernadsky, another — in the Cherkasy Museum "Kobzar", is also in the Museum of the Liberation Struggle. S. Bandera (London — Great Britain) and in the library of Harvard University (USA). Kobzar was copied and even sold in manuscripts. A copy of the Kobzar, transcribed and painted by Taras Shevchenko's friends, which they presented to him instead of the one taken away by the guards after his return from exile, has been preserved.

==== Third edition ====
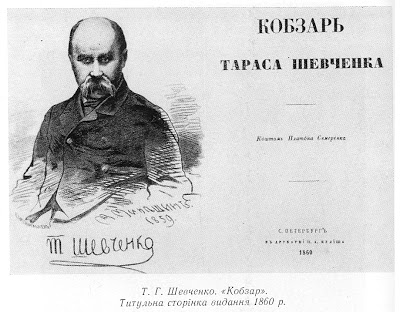
Kobzar, 1860 edition

"Kobzar" was published in 1860 at the expense of Platon Symyrenko, with whom Taras Shevchenko met during his last trip to Ukraine in 1859 in Mliiv. Platon Simirenko - a well-known sugar producer and philanthropist in Ukraine - allocated 1,100 rubles for the publication of "Kobzar". This edition was much more complete than the previous ones: it included 17 works. At the beginning - a portrait of Taras Shevchenko. However, the poems "Dream", "Caucasus", "Heretic", the poem "Testament" and similar works could not be included in the publication due to censorship.

=== Other lifetime publications ===
A number of poems that were not included in the Kobzar due to censorship were published by the poet's friends in Leipzig in 1859: a collection of New Poems by Pushkin and Shevchenko.

In the same year, 1860, Kobzar was translated by Russian poets (St. Petersburg, 1860; translated into Russian by M. Gerbel). This is the last edition of "Kobzar" during the author's lifetime. Taras Shevchenko died in 1861.

== Important editions of the 19th to early 20th centuries ==
=== Publication in Osnova magazine (1861) ===
In January–December 1861, an unordered selection of 69 poems by Taras Shevchenko was published in the magazine Osnova (Books I-XII) edited by Vasyl Bilozersky.

Each of the publications was entitled "Kobzar". The text was printed in Kulishivka and had accents on words with several syllables (except for the letter "i", on which the printing house could not always mark accents for technical reasons). Book I appeared during Shevchenko's lifetime, and an obituary was published in February II.

=== Kozhanchikov publication (1867) ===
In 1867, the Kobzar was published at the expense of the Russian publisher D. Kozhanchikov. It was at that time the most complete edition of "Kobzar", compiled by M. I. Kostomarov and G.S. Vashkevich. On June 6, 1867, IT Lysenkov filed a lawsuit with the St. Petersburg District Court, accusing D. Yu. Kozhanchikov of illegally publishing Shevchenko's works. Nikolay Nekrasov, Kostomarov and O. M. Pippin acted as experts in court. The process, which lasted ten years, ended in favor of D. Kozhanchikov (see: Bezyazychny V. Taras Shevchenko and bookseller Ivan Lysenkov... // Book trade. — 1964. — No. 3). [5]

=== Prague publication (1876) ===
More extensive (containing many previously unpublished works of the poet) was the Prague edition of "Kobzar" in 1876, commissioned by member of the Kyiv "Community" Alexander Rusov. He brought Taras Hryhorovych's brothers Osyp and Mykyta to Kyiv from Kyrylivka. Citizens bought from them the right to publish all works. On October 24, 1874, a "merchant" was concluded in Kyiv. Under its terms, for four years Shevchenko had to receive 5 thousand rubles — a huge amount at the time. In 1875, Alexander Rusov left for Prague, where he published Kobzar (1875-1876) in two volumes. Russian imperial censorship allowed to import only the first volume into Russia. In the second volume, 18 poems (from the Big Book) appeared for the first time.

=== Later publications ===
- 1878 — in Geneva, Mykhailo Drahomanov published a pocket version of the Kobzar in reprint. The size of the book is 9 by 5 cm. The books were smuggled into Ukraine in cigarette packs.
- 1880 — Drahomanov published a version of the Kobzar in Ukrainian Latin.
- 1889 — The Kobzar was first published in Kyiv.
- In 1907, 1908 and 1910 a relatively complete edition of "Kobzar" was published, prepared by the Ukrainian scientist Vasyl Domanytsky.
- A 19-volume Kobzar was published by the same scholar in 1911 at the Valentin Yakovenko publishing house in St. Petersburg, dedicated to the 50th anniversary of Taras Shevchenko's death. The title page of the publication with a portrait of Shevchenko was made by Ivan Kramskaya, and the drawings were prepared by Samiylo Dudin and Mykhailo Tkachenko.
- 1914 — in Lviv The Taras Shevchenko Scientific Society reprinted a small number of phototypes of the first edition from 1840 (114 pages), which are also rare today. They differ from the first printing by lower quality of paper. On a separate page the initial data of this edition — the publisher, year of the reprint edition, circulation were specified. Books with this page are very rare.
- 1928 -- in Kyiv-Kharkiv, was published an illustrated edition by the publishing house Radianske selo (Soviet village). The cover wrappers are by Okhrim Sudomora.

=== Publication in the Ukrainian diaspora ===
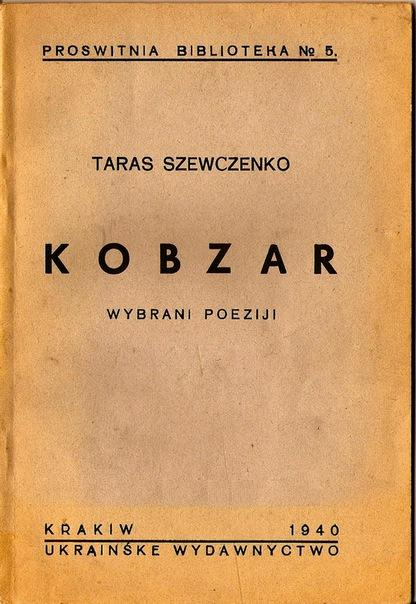
* The frontpage of "Kobzar" by Taras Shevchenko, published in 1940 in Ukrainian Latin alphabet.

- In 1922, an illustrated collection of T. Shevchenko's poems entitled "Kobzar" with a biography and foreword by Bohdan Lepky was published by the Ukrainske Slovo publishing house in Berlin.
- Also in 1922, Dr. A. J. Hunter released in Canada an English-language translation of Shevchenko's work, entitled, "The Kobzar of the Ukraine."
- In 1940, a unique alphabet of the Kobzar was published by the Ukrainian publishing house in Kraków.

== Editions in the late 20th and early 21st centuries ==
- In 2013, Peter Fedynsky released an English language translation entitled "The Complete Kobzar: The Poetry of Taras Shevchenko."

== See also ==
- Kobzar
- Izbornyk
- List of Ukrainian-language poets
- List of Ukrainian-language writers
- Ukrainian literature
