= Battle of Boryspil =

- Part of Polish–Soviet War
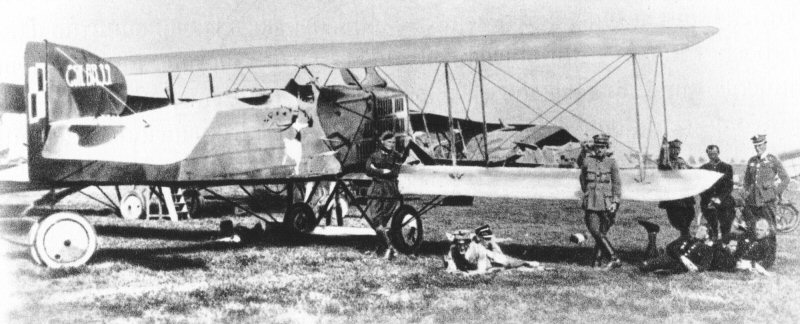
- Polish Air Forces Breguet 14 stationed on the Kyiv airfield.
Date	2 June 1920
Location	near Kyiv, Ukraine
Result	Polish-Ukrainian victory

Belligerents
Poland; Ukrainian People's Republic	Russian SFSR

Units involved
2 battalions (part of 1st Legions Infantry Regiment)	58th Rifle Division

The Battle of Boryspil happened on 2 June 1920, near the town of Boryspil near Kyiv. It was fought between the Polish and Russian forces during the Polish-Bolshevik War and was a part of the Polish counter-assault after the ill-fated Russian offensive of 27 May.

== History ==
After capturing Kyiv in early May, the Polish and Ukrainian forces of 2nd and 3rd Armies were centered on Kyiv, along the Dnieper river and a small bridgehead on the eastern side of the river. After the assault of the Budyonny's 1st Cavalry Army has been repelled, the Polish commander Edward Rydz-Śmigły feared that the Russian forces of the 12th Army might want to assault the bridgehead directly. To prevent this and disrupt the Russian preparations, an assault group was created in Kyiv, composed of merely two battalions of infantry from the elite 1st Legions Infantry Regiment. The Polish units were loaded onto river barges in Kyiv and shipped to the village of Vytachiv on the other side.

In the early morning of 2 June, the Poles assaulted the town of Boryspil, where the Soviet 58th Rifle Division was preparing for an assault. Although numerically inferior, the Polish forces managed to take the enemy by surprise and, after a short skirmish, the Russians withdrew eastwards. After capturing the Russian supply dumps, the Poles returned to Kyiv.

Although the losses on both sides were low, the Polish assault managed to disrupt the preparations of the Yakir's Group for the assault of the bridgehead.
