= Okhrim Sudomora =

Ukrainian Soviet artist (1889–1968)

- Born: 19 March 1889; Boryspil, Russian Empire
- Died: 13 October 1968 (aged 79); Kyiv, Ukrainian SSR, Soviet Union
- Education: Kyivan Cave Monastery Icon Painting School; Kyiv Art School
- Known for: Book illustration, graphic design

Okhrim Ivanovych Sudomora (Note: In this name that follows East Slavic naming customs, the patronymic is Ivanovych and the family name is Sudomora.) (Note: Also known by the pseudonyms O.S. (О.С.), O. Sud. (О. Суд.) and Did Okhr. (Дід Охр.)) (Ukrainian: Охрім Іванович Судомора; 19 March 1889 – 13 October 1968) was a Ukrainian Soviet graphic artist, illustrator, and poster artist.

== Biography ==
He was born on 19 March 1889 in the city of Boryspil (now in Ukraine's Kyiv Oblast). From 1904 to 1907, he studied at the Icon Painting and Art School of the Kyiv-Pechersk Lavra under Ivan Izhakevych, and from 1907 to 1913 at the Kyiv Graphic Arts and Printing School, where he also taught.

From 1913, he worked in book design, illustrated children's books for Kyiv (later Vienna and Prague) publishing houses "Chas" (Time), "Dniprosoiuz", "Dzvin" (Bell), "Vernyhora"; from 1913 to 1914 he designed the magazine "Siaivo" (Aura) and numerous children's fairy tales (among them, The War of Mushrooms and Beetles, 1919). From 1924, he worked for the Kharkiv and Kyiv publishing houses "Shliakh Osvity" (Path of Education), "Knyhospilka" (Ukrainian Co-operative Publishing Association), "Radianske Selo" (1924-1934, Soviet Village)), "Radianska Shkola" (1935-1941, Soviet School), and the journals Zhovten (October) and Pioneria (Pioneering). He was a member of the pro-Soviet Association of Artists of Red Ukraine formed in 1926.

"Swan, lobster, and pike" by Did Okhr. [pseud. of Okhrim Sudomora] published in Gedz (Kyiv, 1918), no. 5, p. 1.

From 1941 to 1943, he worked in the publishing house of the newspaper Nove Ukrainske Slovo (New Ukrainian Word), which was published during the German occupation of Kyiv. There, he worked on art design and contributed anti-Soviet caricatures. In 1943, with the advance of the Red Army, he moved to Lviv where he illustrated the magazine "Mali druzi" (Little Friends) and children's fairy tales for the "Ukrainske vydavnytstvo" (Ukrainian Publishing House). From 1945 to 1948, he worked at the Kharkiv Regional Book and Newspaper Publishing House, as well as at the Agricultural Publishing House of the Ukrainian SSR and at "Radianska Shkola" (Soviet School). In 1949, the artist was sentenced to 25 years to labor camps for a caricature of Joseph Stalin with his hands covered in blood that he had drawn for the German-run New Ukrainian Word. He served his sentence in the Komi Autonomous Soviet Socialist Republic. Sudomora was granted amnesty in 1955 after Stalin's death. According to one account, the artist was shot by NKVD officers at the place of detention. However, according to Oleh, his grandson, Okhrim Ivanovych lived with his wife P. E. Sudomora, his son Yuri, and daughter Kateryna, in Kyiv on Vozdvyzhensky Lane until 1955. He died in poverty in 1968. Sudomora is buried in the Pechersk (Zvirynets) cemetery.

== Works ==
Illustration by O. Sudomora from War of Mushrooms and Beetles (Kyiv, 1919)

Sudomora's artistic style draws comparisons to Aubrey Beardsley. He is particularly recognized for his color illustrations to children's literature. The illustrations are characterized by their decorativeness and their folk-art elements. This style would eventually go against socialist realism, a style that dominated in the Soviet Union beginning in the 1930s. Sudomora's style was branded as "formalistic." For this reason, Sudomora could only contribute illustrations to Soviet journals, school textbooks, and calendars. He illustrated works by Alexander Pushkin, Taras Shevchenko, Borys Hrinchenko, L.I. Hlibov, and Natalia Zabila, as well as Ukrainian folk tales (Kyrylo Kozhumiak). He made a number of posters, including "Hei siudy, divchata zhyvo...!" (Hey here, girls alive...!) (early 1920s), and designed Ex Libris. His illustrations and designs appeared in the following publications:

- Війна грибів з жуками (War of mushrooms and beetles) (Kyiv, 1919; Odesa 1922);
- Прибадашка (Kyiv, 1920);
- Сам собі пан (Mr. Himself) Borys Hrinchenko (1924);
- Непокірний (Recalcitrant) Borys Hrinchenko (Kharkiv, 1928);
- Івасик-рибалка (Ivasyk the fisherman) O. Donchenko (Kharkiv, 1928);
- Кобзар (Kobzar) Taras Shevchenko, (Kyiv, 1928);
- У морі (At sea) Natalia Zabila (Kharkiv, 1928)
- Сійся, родися, жито, пшениця (Sow, be born, rye, wheat) Ostap Vyshnia (1939);

It was not until 1943 (under German occupation), that Sudomora was able to reinstate his self-expression. His contributions from this period are distinctly anti-German and anti-Soviet. These illustrated works date to this later period.

- Весела праця: народня пісенька на новий лад (Happy work: folk song for a new order) (1944);
- Про двох цапків. Дві кізочки (About two goats) (1946);
- Бім бом, дзелень бом! (Bim bom, dzelen bom!) (Munich, 1949)
