= Perebendya =

1839 Ukrainian-language poem by Taras Shevchenko

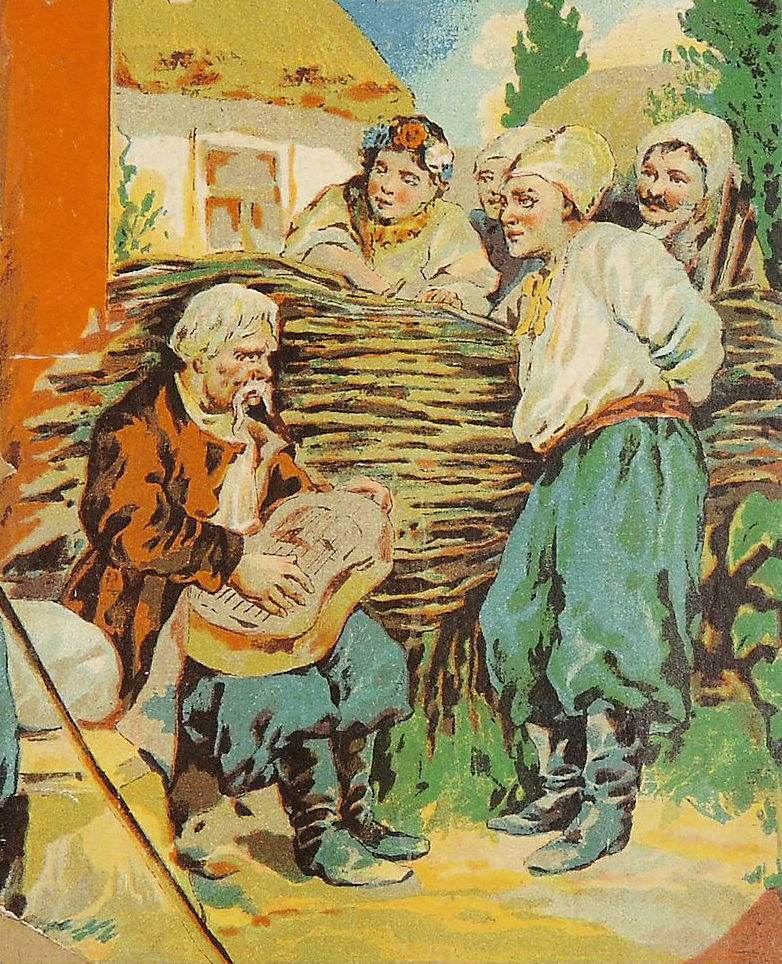
Depiction of Perebendia from a collection of Ukrainian songs published in 1901

"Perebendya" (Ukrainian: «Перебендя») is a Ukrainian poem by Taras Shevchenko about a blind itinerant Ukrainian bard (kobzar).

The poem was written approximately in 1839 in Saint Peterburg. The first known publication of this poem is in the first edition of Shevchenko's best-known poetry collection. Kobzar, published in Saint Petersburg in 1840. Here, the poem was dedicated to Yevhen Hrebinka. The poem was published again in the 1844 edition of Kobzar without the dedication to Hrebinka and with some orthographic changes. The same year the poem was published in the Polish transliteration in the collection Wirszy T. Szewczenka (the publication contained one grammatical error in declension.)

When, after his return from exile, Shevchenko was preparing the publication Poetry by Shevchenko, Volume 1 he reworked the text again and renamed the poem "Kobzar". The new publication of the volume encountered difficulties with the censorship office, which only granted permission to reprint the previously published collection. Therefore, the compromise version of the poem was published in 1860 with only some of the poet's corrections being included.

When the publication was in print, Shevchenko made several more changes. The manuscript reveals that he restored the original name while not crossing out the new one as well as several other changes.

Ivan Yizhakevych has a painting with the same name based on the same poem by Taras Shevchenko.

== See also ==
- Izbornyk
- List of Ukrainian-language poets
- List of Ukrainian-language writers
- Ukrainian literature
