= Boryspil =

City in Kyiv Oblast, Ukraine

Boryspil Бориспіль
- City
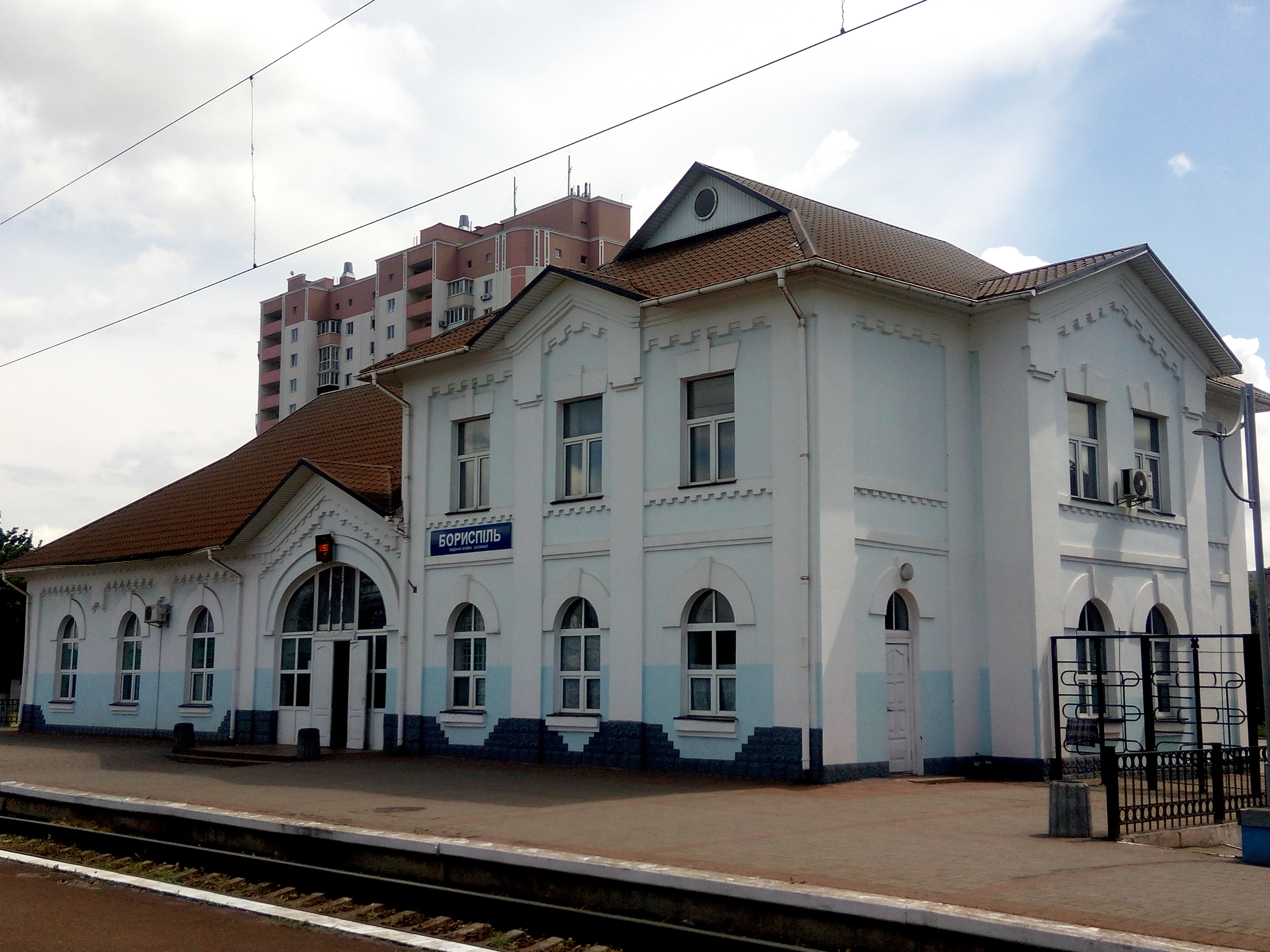
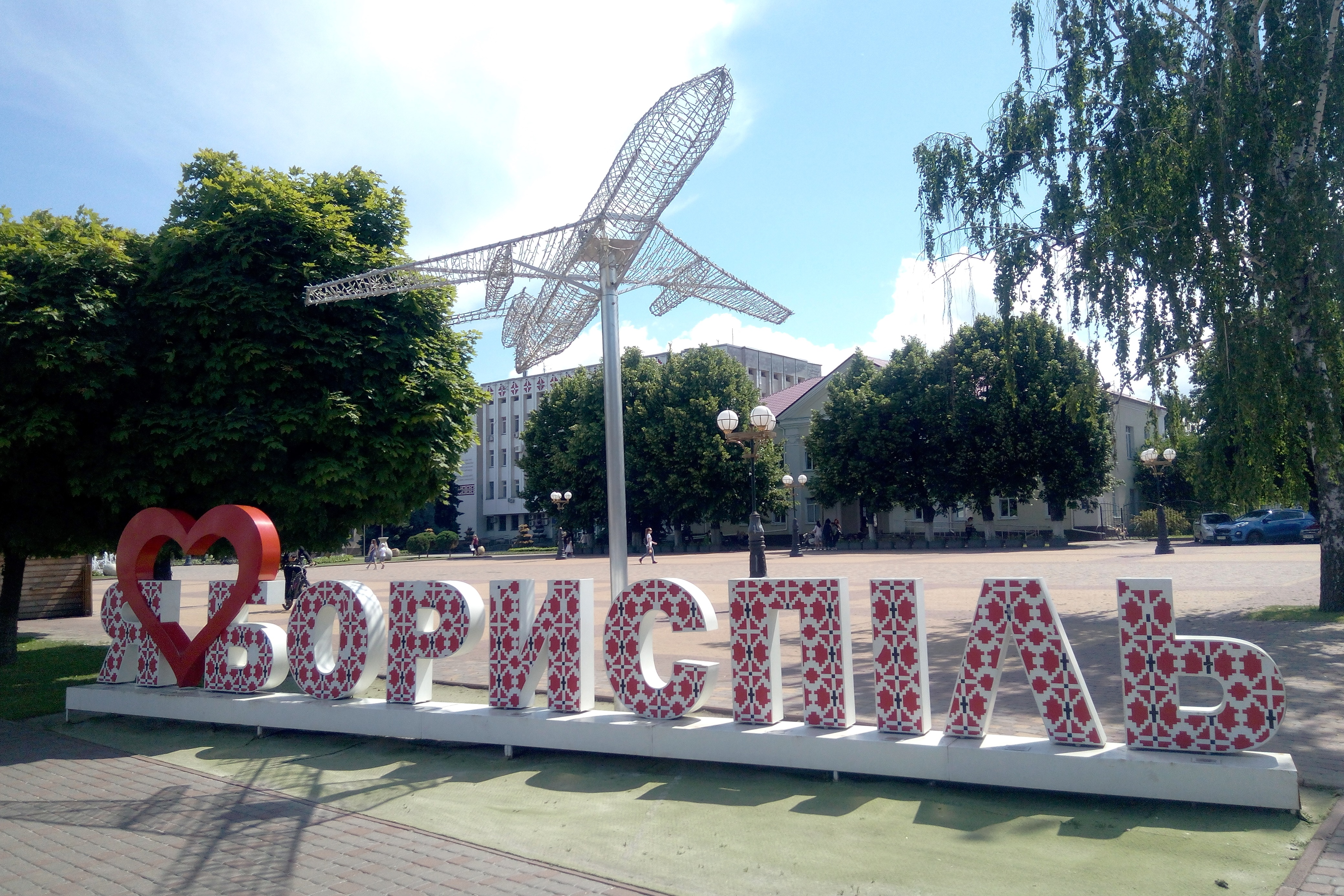
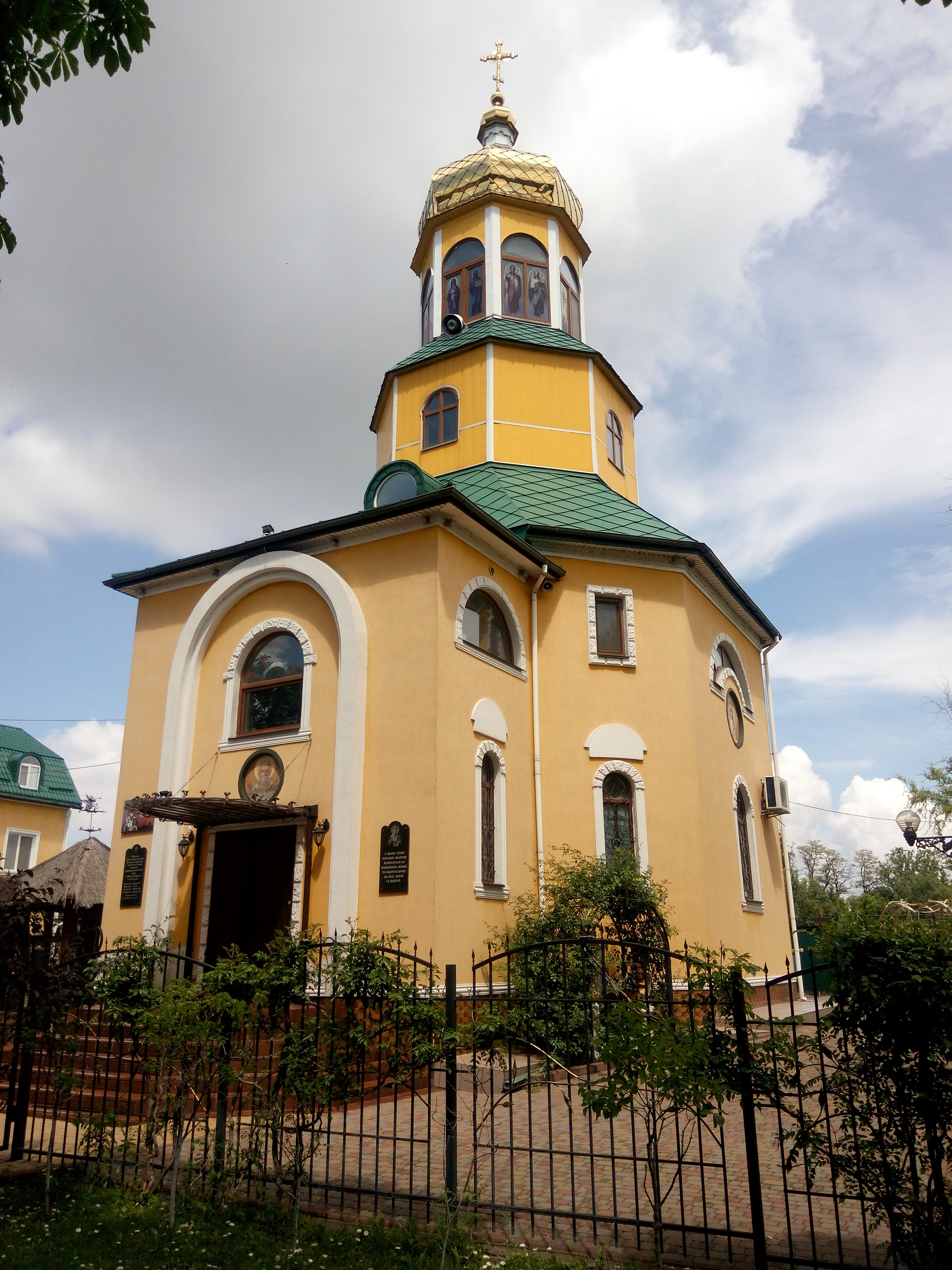
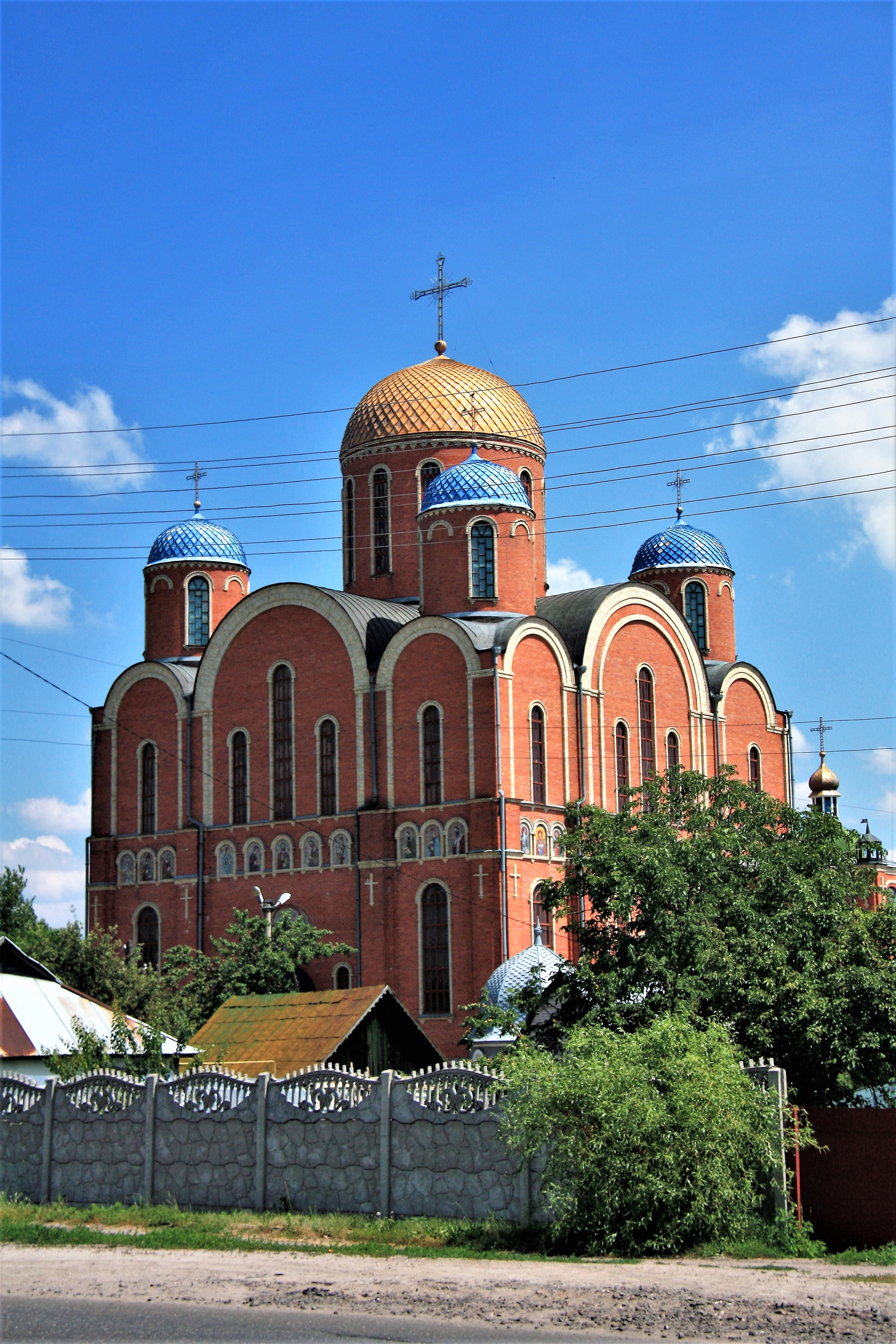
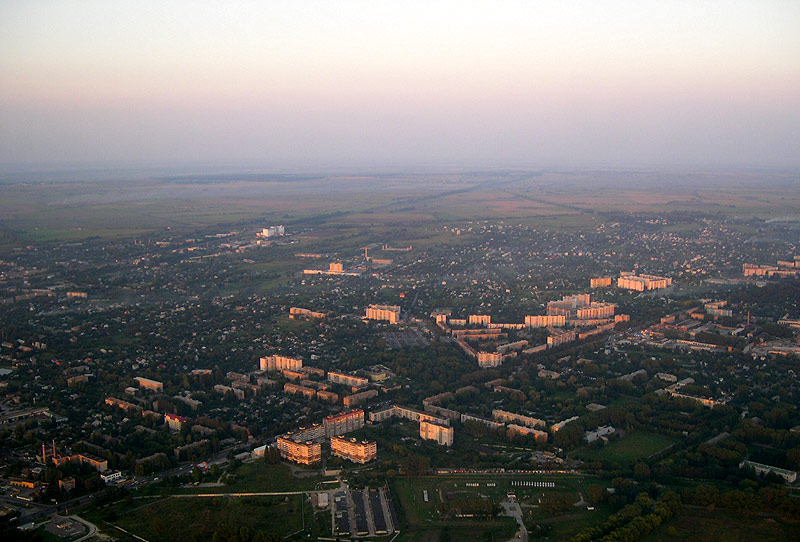
- Top to bottom, left to right: Railway Station; Art installation; Church of Saints Boris and Gleb; Saint Nicholas Church; View of the city

- Flag Coat of arms
- Interactive map of Boryspil
- Boryspil within Ukraine Boryspil (Ukraine)
- Coordinates: 50°21′N 30°57′E
- Country: Ukraine
- Oblast: Kyiv Oblast
- Raion: Boryspil Raion
- Hromada: Boryspil urban hromada
- First mentioned: 1015

Area
  - Total: 37.01 km^{2} (14.29 sq mi)

Population (2022)
  - Total: 64,117
- Area code: +380 4595
- Website: http://www.boryspil.osp-ua.info/

Boryspil (Ukrainian: Бориспіль, IPA: [boˈrɪspilʲ]) is a city and the administrative center of Boryspil Raion in Kyiv Oblast (region) in northern and central Ukraine. It hosts the administration of Boryspil urban hromada, one of the hromadas of Ukraine. The population was estimated as 64,117 (2022 estimate).

== Name ==
Official sources state that the city is named after Prince Boris, of Boris and Gleb, two sons of Vladimir the Great, who were both murdered during the internecine wars of 1015–1019. According to Petro Tronko in his History of cities and villages in Ukrainian SSR, the locality where Boryspil is located was named as "Borysove pole" (Borys's field) when in 1015 a son of Vladimir the Great Borys returning from another raid against Pechenegs died from hands of hired assassins. Others state that the name of the city is of the Greek origin; it consists of two parts Borys from Borysthenes (the Greek name for Dnieper) and Pil from Polis (the Ukrainized version of the Greek word). The city also has a sister city, Hopkins, Minnesota, US.

In Ukrainian language the city has also been historically known as Baryshpil (Баришпіль).

== History ==
The settlement is first mentioned in 1015 in connection with the internecine wars of 1015–1019, and later, in the 12th century, as part of the Kyivan Rus (Ruthenia). Sometime after the Mongol invasion, most of the Ruthenian territory belonged to the Grand Duchy of Lithuania. The site of the settlement belonged to the King's translator Soltan Albiyevich who in 1508 sold it to the Kyiv Saint Nicholas Hermitage. It is believed that it was then when the settlement received its modern name.

After the Union of Lublin, the southern regions of the Grand Duchy of Lithuania were passed over to the Polish Crown and in 1590 on decision of the Sejm of the Polish–Lithuanian Commonwealth, the settlement was given to Wojtech Czonowicki, a senior of the Registered Cossacks, who later participated in the Kosiński uprising. In 1596 the Polish King Sigismund III Vasa transformed the town into a royal estate and there was formed the Boryspol starostwo. Later the same year it was granted the Magdeburg rights (or possibly Lübeck law) and in the town was built a ratusz. The Boryspil town's coat of arms contained an image of Saint Stanislav (see Stanislaus of Szczepanów). With extinguishing the Nalyvaiko Uprising, the Boryspil starostwo was passed to Stanisław Żółkiewski and stayed as the Żółkiewski's family estate until the 1648 Khmelnytsky Uprising.

On 14 January 1752 the Hetman of Little Russia Kyrylo Rozumovsky gave the town in eternal possession of his brother-in-law Kyiv Colonel Yukhym Darahan.

During the Anti-Hetman Uprising, Trypillia division of Otaman Zeleny fought a battle against the Hetmanate forces at Boryspil. In the following years it was a site of rebel activities against the Bolsheviks. On 2 June 1920 during the Battle of Boryspil Polish-Ukrainian forces defeated the Red Army.

Later in 1920, Soviet regime was established in the city. Four collective farms (kolhoz) were created: "Shevchenko Memorial", "Kirov Memorial", "Sickle and Mallet", "Victory".

The town suffered greatly during the Soviet organized Holodomor when between 1 January 1933 to 1 January 1934, when according to official data 5,739 people, among them 266 infants younger than one year old, perished.

During World War II, Boryspil was occupied by the German Army from September 23, 1941 to September 23, 1943. Fierce battles were fought around the city during its capture and liberation. During the Nazi occupation, the airfield of the modern Boryspil International Airport was used as a camp for prisoners of war.

In 1956 Boryspil was officially granted the city status. Currently the city is home to the country's main and biggest airport, Boryspil International Airport (international code KBP) and some minor industry.

Prior to the country-wide administrative reform of 17 July 2020, Boryspil was incorporated as a city of oblast significance, and was not part of Boryspil Raion, even though the administrative centre of the raion was located there.

== Geography ==
=== Climate ===
Climate data for Boryspil (1981–2010)
Month	Jan	Feb	Mar	Apr	May	Jun	Jul	Aug	Sep	Oct	Nov	Dec	Year
Mean daily maximum °C (°F)	−1.2 (29.8)	−0.3 (31.5)	5.4 (41.7)	14.2 (57.6)	21.2 (70.2)	23.9 (75.0)	26.0 (78.8)	25.4 (77.7)	19.4 (66.9)	12.3 (54.1)	4.1 (39.4)	−0.1 (31.8)	12.5 (54.5)
Daily mean °C (°F)	−3.9 (25.0)	−3.4 (25.9)	1.4 (34.5)	9.0 (48.2)	15.4 (59.7)	18.5 (65.3)	20.4 (68.7)	19.4 (66.9)	14.0 (57.2)	8.0 (46.4)	1.7 (35.1)	−2.6 (27.3)	8.2 (46.8)
Mean daily minimum °C (°F)	−6.4 (20.5)	−6.2 (20.8)	−1.9 (28.6)	4.5 (40.1)	10.0 (50.0)	13.5 (56.3)	15.2 (59.4)	14.1 (57.4)	9.5 (49.1)	4.3 (39.7)	−0.7 (30.7)	−4.4 (24.1)	4.3 (39.7)
Average precipitation mm (inches)	28.6 (1.13)	30.5 (1.20)	31.2 (1.23)	42.2 (1.66)	54.9 (2.16)	74.8 (2.94)	70.1 (2.76)	55.0 (2.17)	58.2 (2.29)	35.4 (1.39)	41.4 (1.63)	37.5 (1.48)	559.8 (22.04)
Average precipitation days (≥ 1.0 mm)	7.2	7.1	7.3	7.1	7.9	9.1	8.5	6.6	7.2	6.3	7.7	7.8	89.8
Average relative humidity (%)	82.7	80.3	75.3	66.4	63.2	69.4	70.2	69.1	74.3	78.2	84.6	85.0	74.9
Mean monthly sunshine hours	52.3	74.1	135.4	184.7	277.1	276.8	290.9	271.2	177.8	126.2	50.3	43.8	1,960.6
Source: World Meteorological Organization

== Demographics ==
As of the 2001 Ukrainian census, Boryspil had a population of 53,953 inhabitants, ranking it fourth in the entire Kyiv Oblast. (Note: Excluding the city of Kyiv, which is a separate administrative division, and does not belong to the Oblast.) Accounting for roughly 90% of the population at the time of the census, ethnic Ukrainians constitute an overwhelming majority, followed by a notable Russian minority, as well as a small Belarusian community. The exact ethnic composition was as follows:

Ethnic groups in Boryspil
	percent
Ukrainians	89.24%
Russians	9.20%
Belarusians	0.60%
Armenians	0.16%
Poles	0.12%
others	0.68%

When being asked about their first languages, over 88% of the population claimed to be native Ukrainian speakers, 11% claimed to primarily speak Russian. The exact linguistic composition of the city was as follows:

Languages in Boryspil
	percent
Ukrainian	88.3%
Russian	11.2%
Belarusian	0.2%
Armenian	0.1%
others	0.1%

== Infrastructure ==
Aerosvit Airlines had its head office on the grounds of Boryspil International Airport.

Around the city detours the main European route E40, particularly the Kyiv–Kharkiv highway (part of the national M 03 route). Along M 03 between Kyiv and Boryspil International Airport stretches a modernized motorway.

In the city also starts another national highway H 08 which connects Boryspil with Zaporizhzhia.

== Sports ==
It also hosts Ukrainian Premier League team Arsenal Kyiv at the Kolos Stadium.

== Press ==
- "Trudova Slava" newspaper (since 1930)
- "Visti" newspaper (since 2000)

== Notable people ==
People born in Boryspil

- Pavlo Chubynsky (1839–1884), author of the Ukrainian National Anthem
- Oleksandr Kravchenko (born 1983), politician currently serving as the Minister of Economy
- Vitalii Sediuk (born 1988), prankster and former television reporter
- Okhrim Sudomora (1889-1968), graphic and poster artist, illustrator of Ukrainian literary and children's books

== Gallery ==
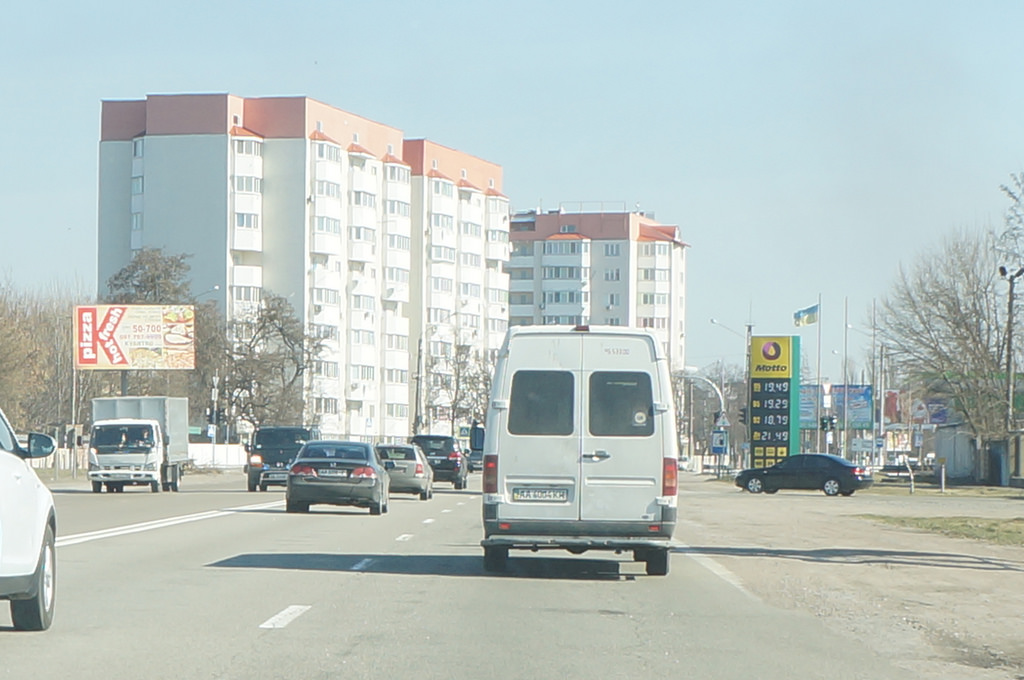
Entrance to Boryspil from Kyiv-Boryspil motorway

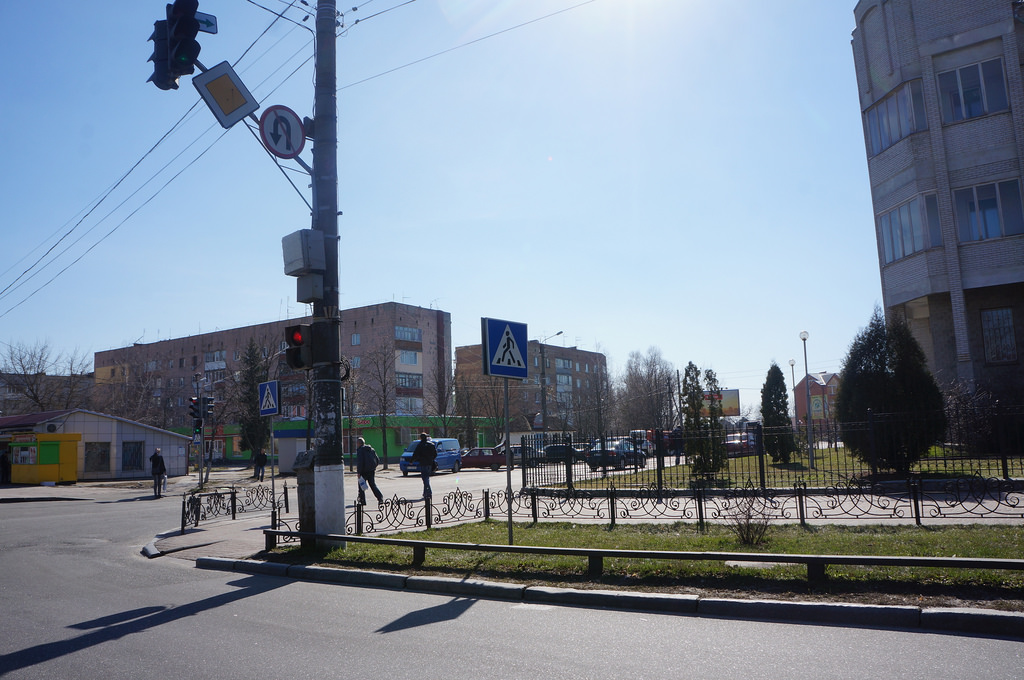
A street intersection in downtown Boryspil

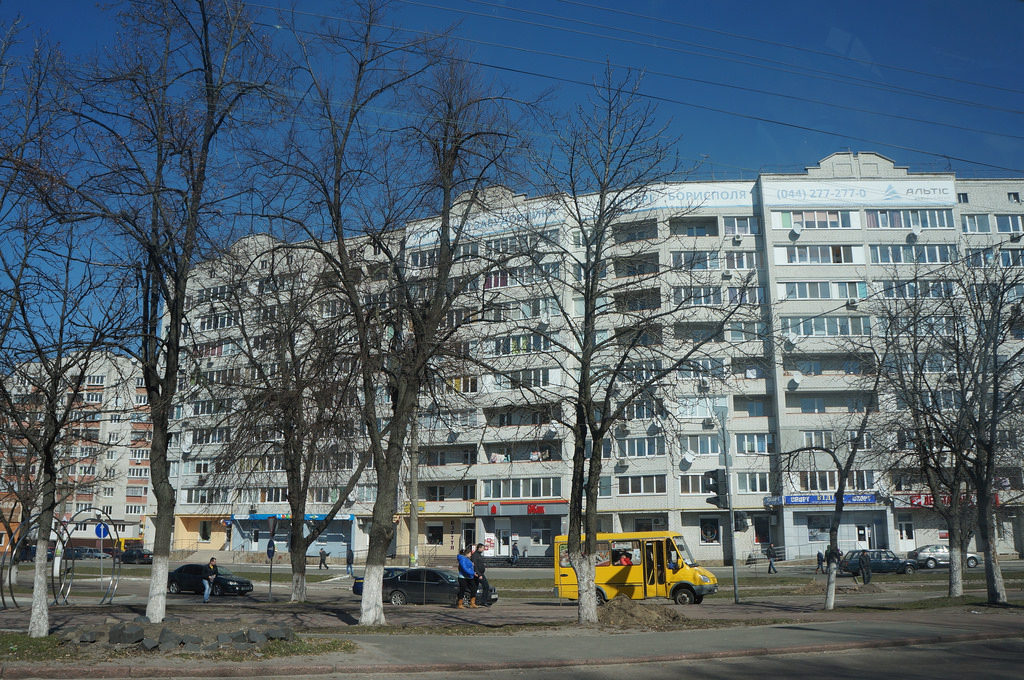
A multi-storey apartment block

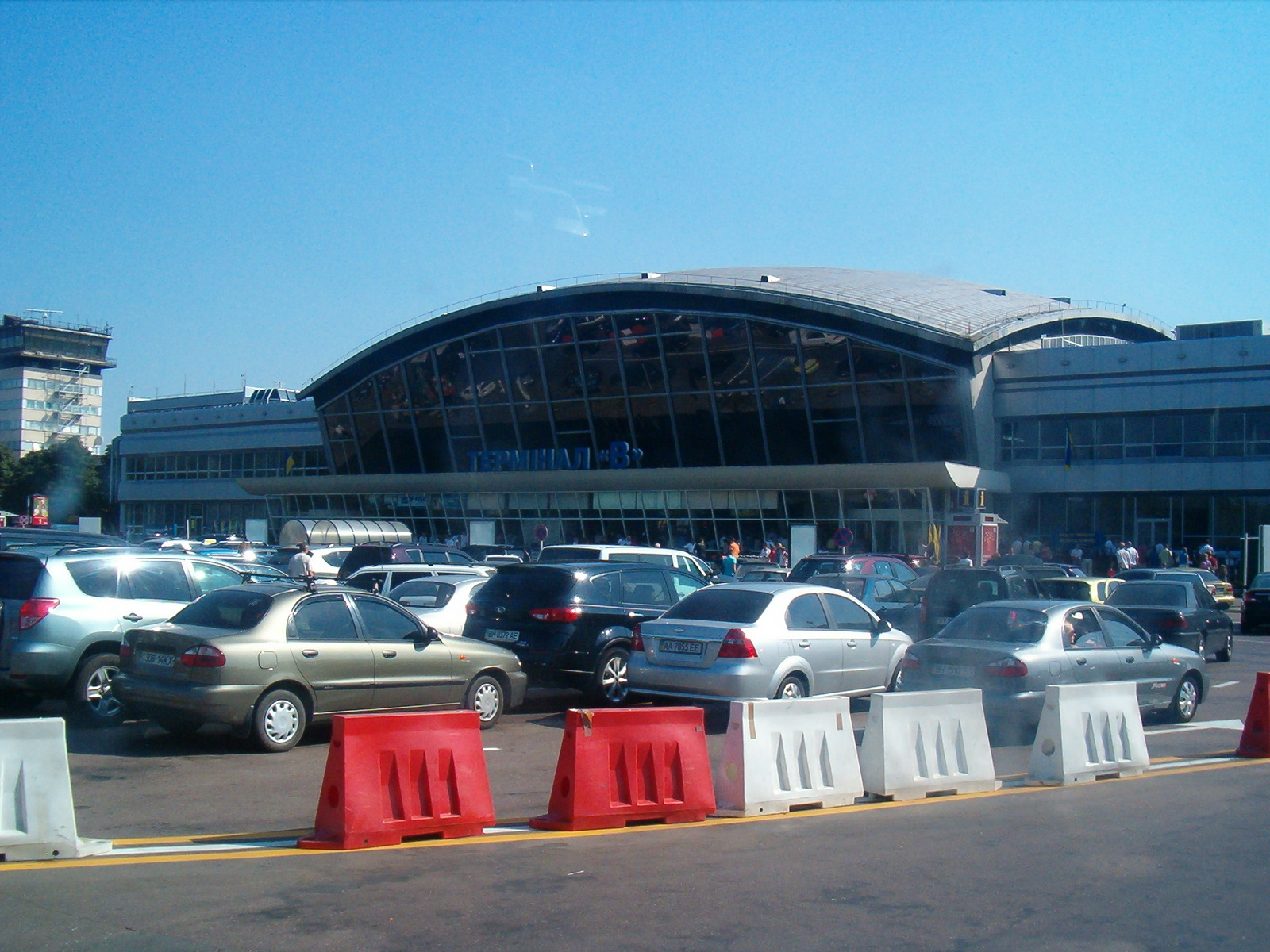
Boryspil Airport

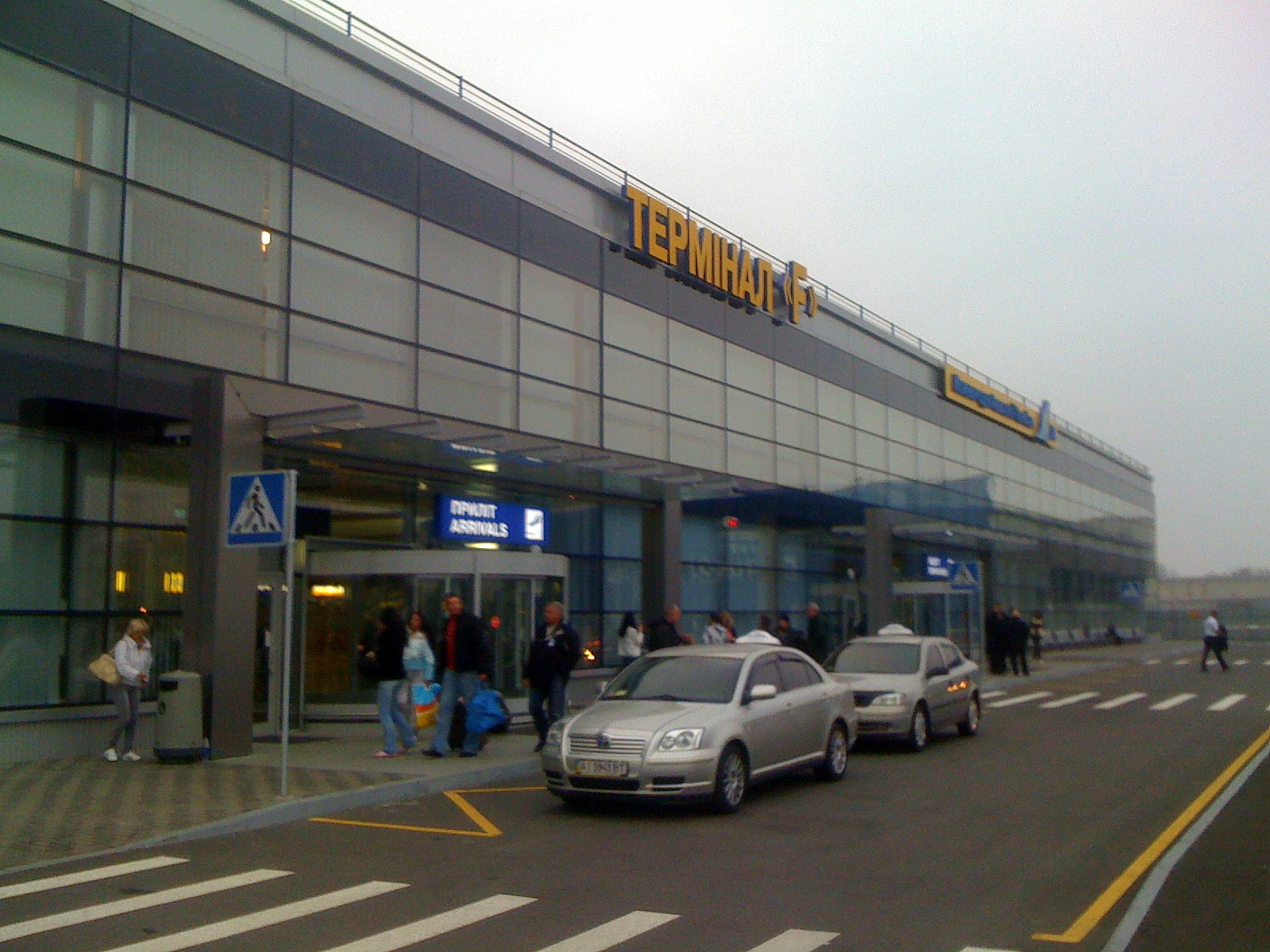
Boryspil Airport, Terminal F

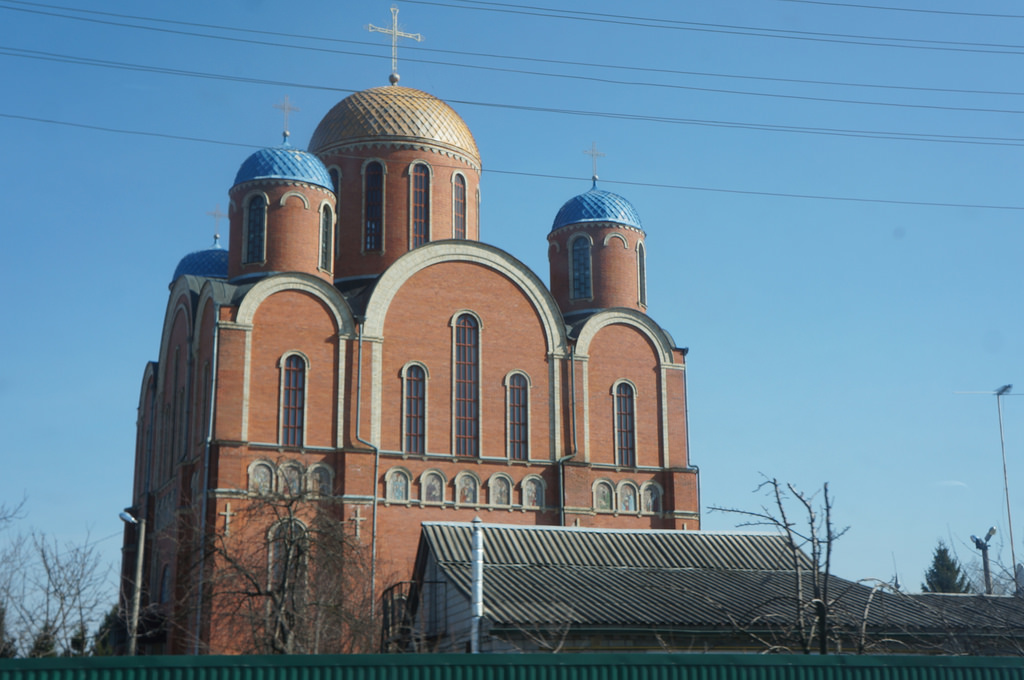
Saints Boris and Gleb Church

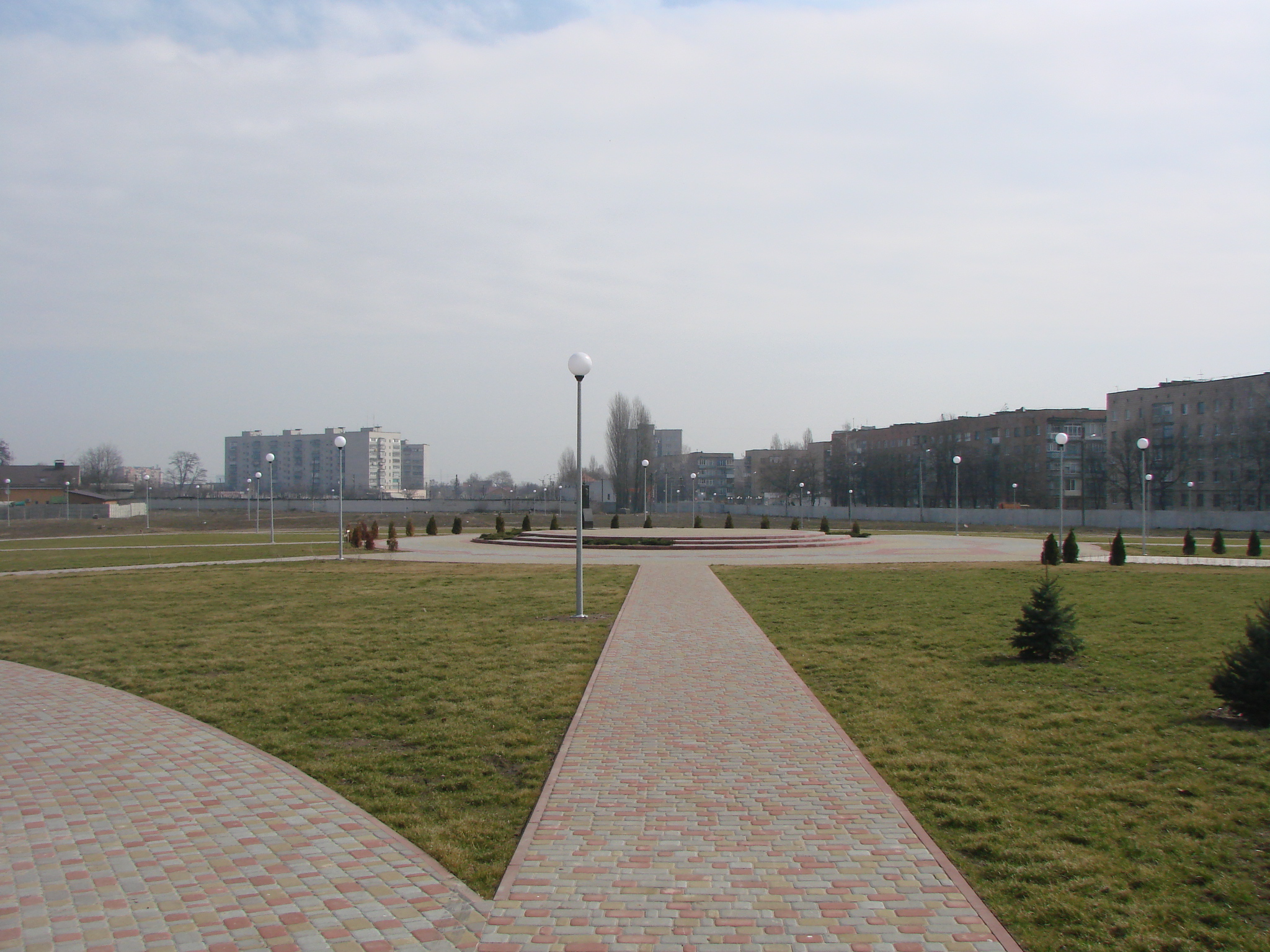
Memorial park complex

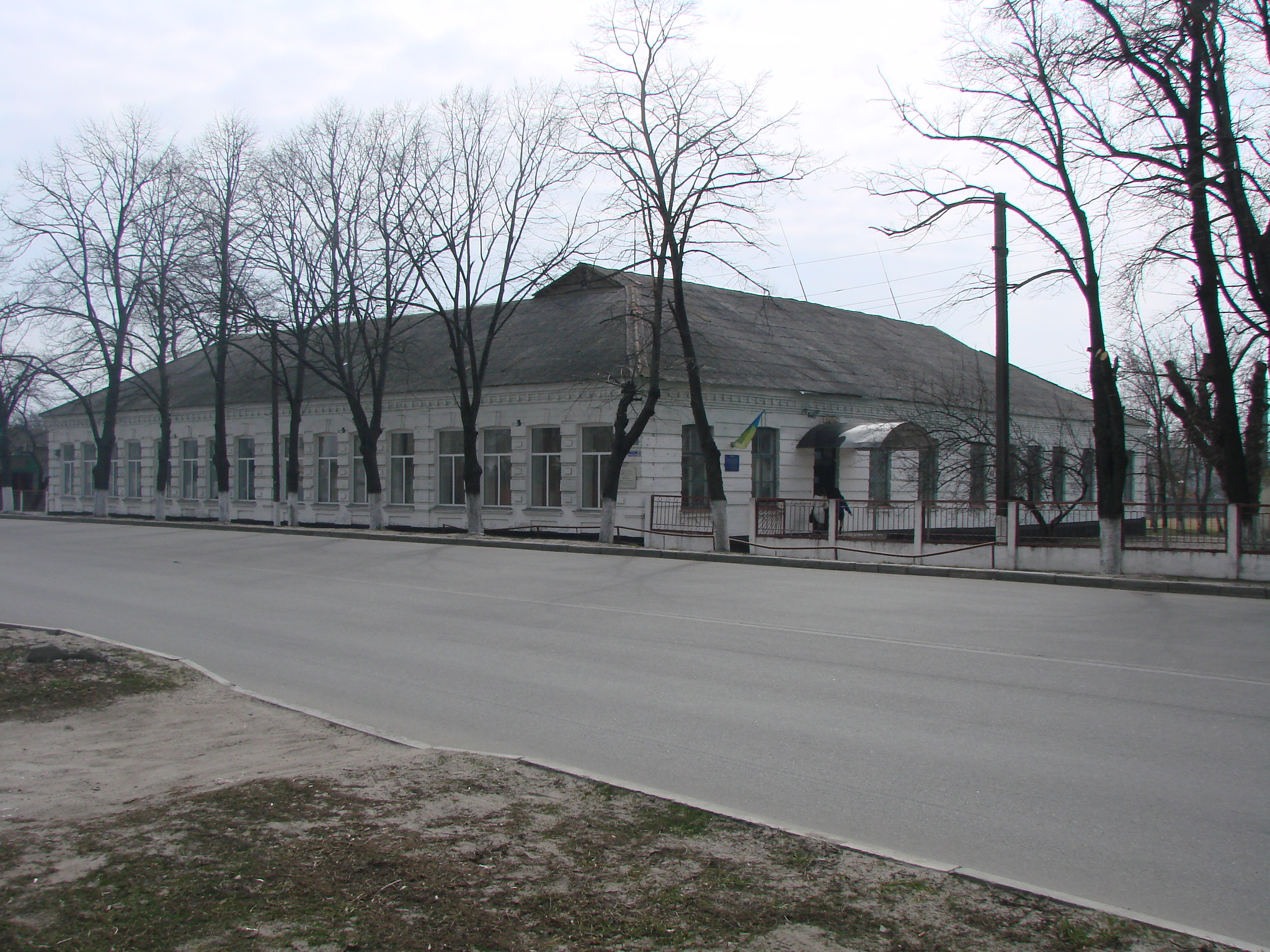
Old school building

== See also ==
- Battle of Boryspil (1920)
