= Dream (Taras Shevchenko poem) =

Lyrical pamphlet by Taras Shevchenko, 1844

- Author: Taras Shevchenko
- Original title: Сон
- Language: Ukrainian
- Genre: Narrative poem, satire, comedy
- Published: 1844
- Publication place: Russian Empire

"Dream" (Ukrainian: Сон, romanized: Son) is a comical poem by Taras Shevchenko created in 1844. Written as a lyrical pamphlet, it is the first work of satire by the poet and one of the first in new Ukrainian literature. Directed against social and national oppression and against the socio-political system of autocracy, serfdom and the church, the poem condemned the slavish obedience of the masses and the national treason of the top levels of the Ukrainian society, which went to the service of the imperial power.

== History of creation and publication ==
The original manuscript from the album Three summers is dated July 8, 1844 Saint Petersburg. Numerous copies of the work have been preserved. Shevchenko created his acutely political poem without expecting it to be printed. "Dream" was first published as a separate booklet in 1865 in Lviv. In Russia, the poem was printed as a censored excerpt (lines 75-156) for the first time in Kobzar (St. Petersburg, 1867). Then, the entire poem was printed in Kobzar edited by Vasyl Domanytskyi (St. Petersburg, 1907).

The poem is a kind of summary of the author's thoughts about the time and fate of his people. Shevchenko wrote the poem after his first trip to Ukraine under the direct impression of the social reality of that time. The creation of the poem was prepared by all the previous development of the author of Kobzar: his assimilation of the traditions of Ukrainian satirical literature, folk humor, burlesque, parody, satirical work of Mykola Gogol (there is a certain connection between Gogol's grotesque and the fantastic-grotesque images of "Dream" ), Russian freedom-loving poetry (Pushkin, Lermontov, the Decembrists, anonymous anti-tsarist works). The work has many typological features in common with the poems of Adam Mickiewicz (Dziady) and Heinrich Heine (Germany. A Winter's Tale). During the investigation into the case of the Brotherhood of Saints Cyril and Methodius, the poem "Dream" was one of the main pieces of evidence of Shevchenko's anti-government activities and the basis for the severe punishment of the author.

== Plot ==
In the prologue, Shevchenko reflects on the fact that each person has his own destiny and depicts the social and moral sins that flourish in the country. In the main part of the poem, the drunken protagonist dreams about flying over Ukraine, then over Siberia and eventually reaching St. Petersburg. He looks around the city, and then, having become invisible, enters the royal palace, where an angry tsar kicks his dignitaries. At the end of the poem, the tsar turns into a kitten, and this metamorphosis forces the hero to laugh. The tsar's glance at the main character wakes him up.

== Themes ==
In the poem, Shevchenko depicts the life in the times when the common people were enslaved by the autocracy and satirically ridicules executioners and robbers of the people. Shevchenko called his work a "comedy" in the sense in which Dante called his work, depicting the sufferings of his soul tormented by the national tragedy. The author's preface indicates both the genre properties of the work and the nature of the reflection of reality.

== Cultural significance ==
The poem Dream is the first political poem in which the autocracy is exposed from the standpoint of the serf peasantry, which realized itself politically in the person of Shevchenko. This work put the author on a par with the most outstanding satirists of world literature. The poem testified to the final crystallization of the anti-imperial core of Shevchenko's democratic worldview, and was a response to the most pressing problems of the social and political life of Ukraine as part of the Russian Empire in the 1840s.

The poem was widely illustrated by artists Ivan Yizhakevych, Vasyl Kasiian, Oleksandr Pashchenko, Kazymyr Agnit-Sledzevskyi, Volodymyr Masyk, Yuriy Severyn and others.

Episodes of the poem and the title were used by the scriptwriters of the movie ''Dream'' Dmytro Pavlychko and Volodymyr Denysenko, in which Shevchenko was played by Ivan Mykolaichuk.

== See also ==
- Kobzar
- Haidamaky (poem)
- List of Ukrainian-language poets
- List of Ukrainian-language writers

== Sources ==
- Hnatyuk M. P. "Dream" // Shevchenko dictionary. The second volume. - K., 1977. - p. 230-232.
- I. M. Dzyuba "Poet Against the Empire" // Taras Shevchenko. Life and creativity. — K., 2008— p. 236—259.
- Zaitsev P.I. "Life of Taras Shevchenko." New York - Paris - Munich, 1955. - p. 164.
- Y. O. Ivakin, V. L. Smilianska "Taras Shevchenko" // History of Ukrainian literature of the 19th century. Book two. — K.: Lybid, 1996. — P.114-116.
