= Boryspil urban hromada =

Boryspil urban hromada Бориспільська міська громада
- Hromada
- Seal
- Interactive map of Boryspil urban hromada
- Country: Ukraine
- Oblast: Kyiv Oblast
- Raion: Boryspil Raion

Area
  - Total: 527.3 km^{2} (203.6 sq mi)

Population (2020)
  - Total: 80,765
  - Density: 153.2/km^{2} (396.7/sq mi)
- Settlements: 19
- Cities: 1
- Villages: 18

Boryspil urban hromada (Ukrainian: Бориспільська міська громада) is a hromada of Ukraine, located in Boryspil Raion, Kyiv Oblast. Its administrative center is the city Boryspil.

It has an area of 527.3 square kilometres (203.6 mi^{2}) and a population of 80,765, as of 2020.

The hromada contains 19 settlements: 1 city (Boryspil), and 18 villages:

- Andriivka
- Artemivka
- Hlyboke
- Horobiivka
- Horodyshche
- Hryhorivka
- Ivankiv
- Kuchakiv
- Kyryivshchyna
- Lebedyn
- Liubartsi
- Mala Starytsia
- Perehudy
- Rohoziv
- Senkivka
- Sulymivka
- Tarasivka
- Velyka Starytsia

== See also ==
- List of hromadas of Ukraine
