= Poor Liza =

- Short story by Nikolay Karamzin
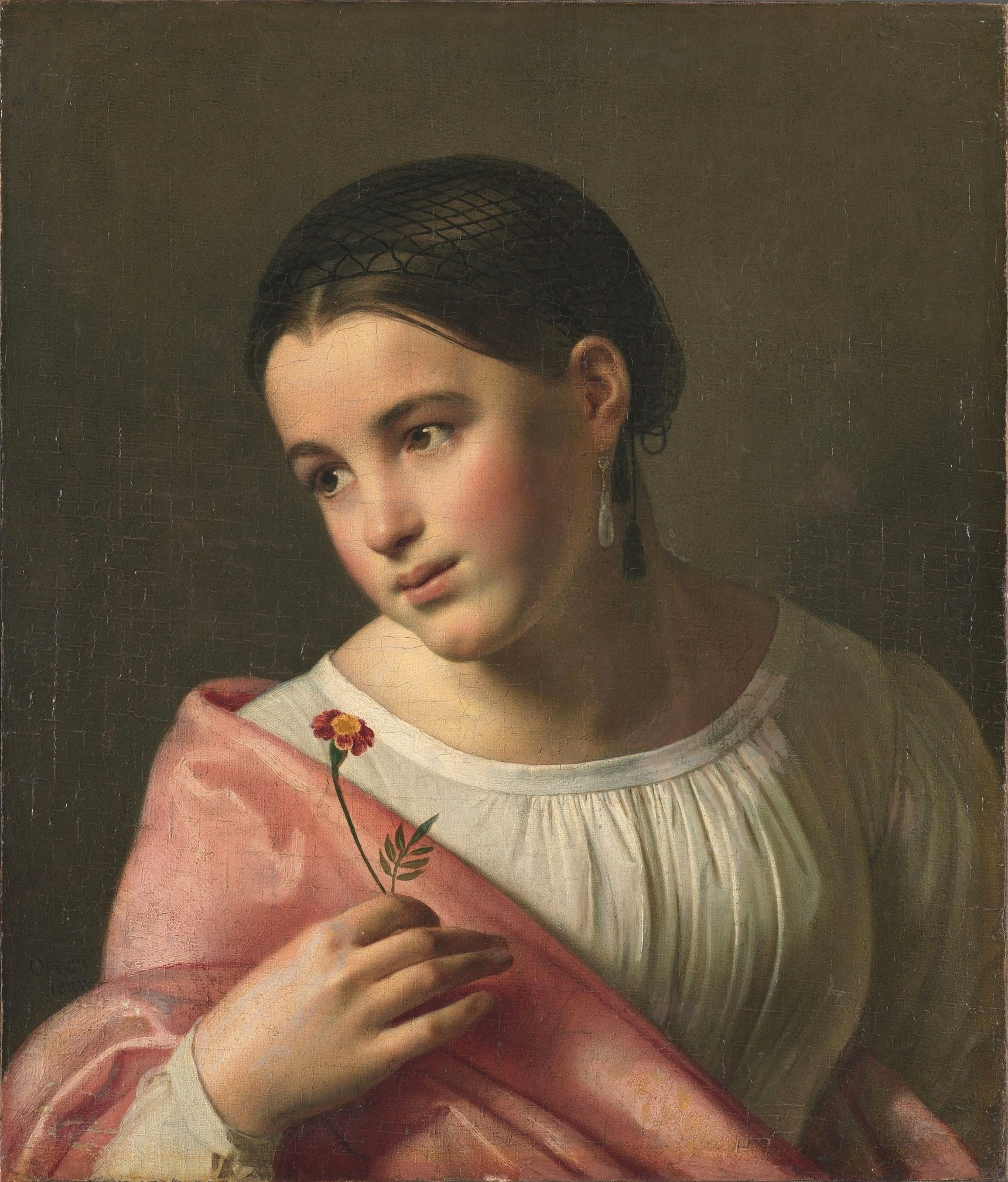
- Depiction of Poor Liza by Orest Kiprensky, 1827

Text available at Russian Wikisource
- Original title: Бедная Лиза
- Country: Russia
- Language: Russian
- Genre: sentimentalism

Publication
- Publication date: 1792
- Published in English: 1803

"Poor Liza" (Russian: Бедная Лиза, romanized: Bednaya Liza) is a 1792 short story or sentimental novella by the Russian author Nikolay Karamzin. It is one of Karamzin's best-known short stories in Russia. It is the tale of two lovers that belong to different social classes which in this case is a young nobleman and a poor peasant girl. The story popularized the sentimentalized peasant girl in 19th-century Russia.

== Plot ==
Liza is a poor serf girl who lives with her elderly, sick mother. Her father died, making Liza the breadwinner of her family at age 15. One of Liza's primary ways of making money is to sell flowers she picked in Moscow.

Two years later, while Liza is selling lily-of-the-valley flowers, she meets a handsome, rich man named Erast. They fall in love, and begin spending many nights together, next to the Simonov Monastery lake. At Erast's request, Liza keeps him a secret from her mother. What Liza does not know is that Erast, despite a good heart, is weak, fickle, and lecherous. Erast wants to have a pure love with Liza but finds his desire for her growing by the day.

One summer evening, Liza comes to Erast in tears, as her mother wants her to marry a well-off man who she does not love. She declares she can only love Erast, and in the heat of the moment, she loses her virginity to him. Erast promises he will marry Liza, but in reality, he has lost interest in her, as she has become impure to him.

In the autumn, Erast tells Liza that he is going off to war and leaves her. Two months later, when Liza comes to the city, she discovers the truth: in the army, he lost all his money in gambling, and married a rich widow to escape his debt. He gives her a hundred rubles, and tells her to forget him. In her grief, Liza drowns herself in the lake of the monastery garden where she and Erast had spent their time together.

== Reception and legacy ==
Karamzin was a major figure in Russian sentimentalism, and "Poor Liza" introduced sentimentalism to the Russian public. First, it was widely loved, with many making a pilgrimage to the lake where Liza drowns herself. As time went on, however, it became an object of mockery, with authors like Pushkin making parodic usage of the name Liza in Queen of Spades and "Mistress-Turned-Maid". Karamzin and his works had a great influence on Dostoevsky: many of his works reference "Poor Liza". Lizaveta is the most common character name in Dostoevsky's works, and many of these characters mirror Liza's fate or otherwise reference "Poor Liza". For instance, Liza Tushina in Demons similarly falls into sin, is forced apart from her beloved, and dies tragically, and Liza Dolgorukaya in The Adolescent was originally supposed to drown herself after being abandoned by Prince Sokolsky.

The name of Erast Fandorin, the eponymous hero of the detective fiction series, is a direct reference to the novella, for Erast's mother Liza dies in childbirth, and the bitter father names his child Erast for having caused Liza's death. The story is referenced in the first Fandorin book, The Winter Queen, where Erast marries a woman named Lizaveta, and an assassination attempt aimed for Erast kills Lizaveta instead.

== Translations ==
"Poor Liza" was first translated into English in 1803, when it appeared in a collection titled Russian Tales by Nicolai Karamsin.

== Depictions ==
=== In film ===
- Poor Liza (2000), dir. Slava Tsukerman
- Poor Liza (Бедная Лиза) (1978), dir. Ideya Garanina

=== In theatre ===
- Original production by Bryantsev Youth Theatre, 2018
- Original production by Theatre of Nations
- Original production by Tovstonogov Bolshoi Drama Theater, 1970s

== Adaptations ==
=== Opera ===
- Poor Liza (Бедная Лиза), one-act opera by Leonid Desyatnikov (1976, revised 1980), with libretto by the composer
