= Taras Shevchenko =

Ukrainian poet and artist (1814–1861)

Taras Shevchenko Тарас Шевченко
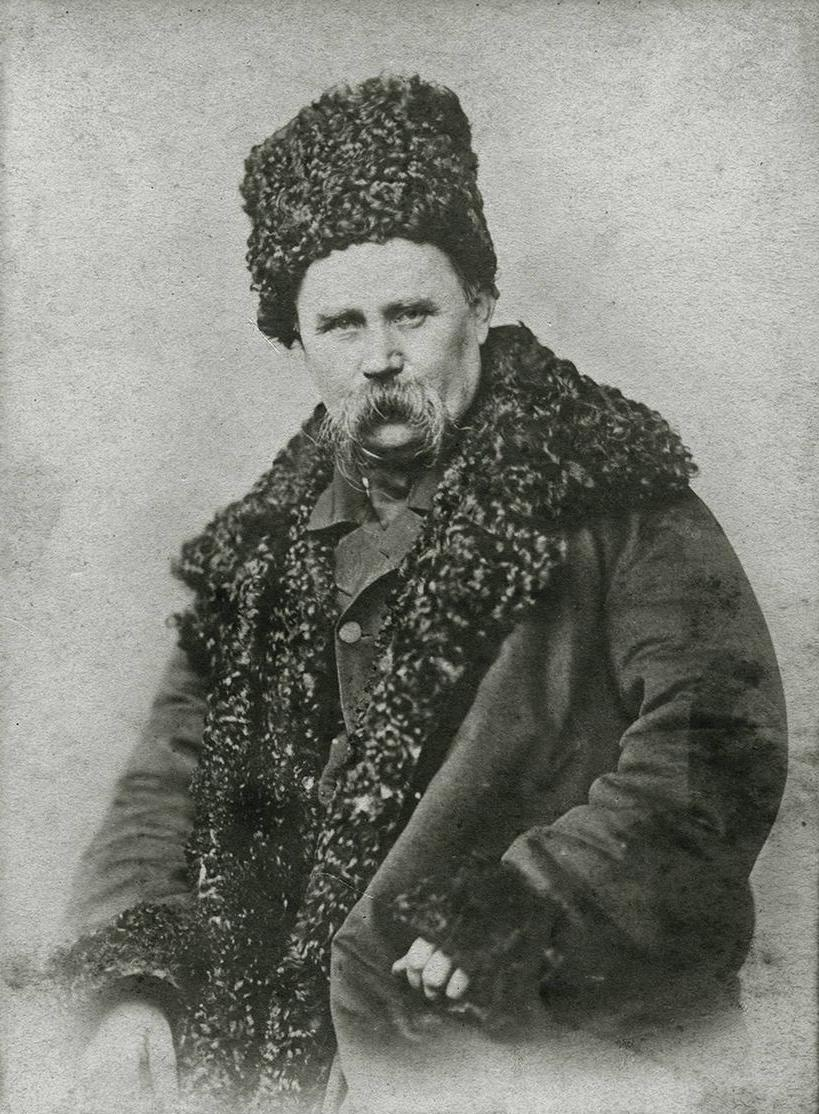
- Shevchenko in 1859
- Born: 9 March 1814; Morintsy, Russian Empire (now in Ukraine)
- Died: 10 March 1861 (aged 47); Saint Petersburg, Russian Empire
- Education: Imperial Academy of Arts
- Occupations: Poet; philosopher; painter; graphic artist; folklorist; ethnographer; activist; playwright
- Writing career
- Pen name: Kobzar
- Language: Ukrainian; Russian
- Period: 1832–1861
- Notable works: Kobzar; Haidamaky; Dream
- Movement: Romanticism

Taras Hryhorovych Shevchenko (Note: At the time of Shevchenko's birth, the parish register of Morintsy was in Russian, the Russian Empire's official language, and he was recorded as Taras ("To the resident of the village of Morintsy Grigori Shevchenko and his wife Katherine was born a son, Taras"). At that time, serfs' patronymic names were not identified in documents (for example, see the text of a "free-to-go" document from 22 April 1838: "eternally let go my serf person Taras Grigoriev, the son of Shevchenko, whom I inherited after my past parent real privy councilor Vasiliy Vasilievich Engelgardt"). During Shevchenko's lifetime, two variants were used in Ukrainian texts: "Taras Grigorievich" (see the letter of Hryhorii Kvitka-Osnovianenko from 23 October 1840: "my lovely lord, Taras Grigorievich") and "Taras Hryhorovych" (the letter of the same author from 29 April 1842: "My dear and noble master Taras Hryhorovych"). In Russian, it is accepted to write «Тарас Григорьевич Шевченко», in Ukrainian—«Тарас Григорович Шевченко», in other languages—transliterating from the Ukrainian name, for example "Taras Hryhorovych Shevchenko".) (Ukrainian: Тарас Григорович Шевченко, Ukrainian pronunciation: [tɐˈrɑz‿ɦrɪˈɦɔrowɪt͡ʃ ʃeu̯ˈt͡ʃɛnko]; Russian: Тарас Григорьевич Шевченко, romanized: Taras Grigoryevich Shevchenko; 9 March 1814 – 10 March 1861) was a Ukrainian poet, writer, artist, public and political figure, folklorist and ethnographer. His literary heritage, in particular the poetry collection Kobzar, is regarded to be the foundation of modern Ukrainian literature and to some degree also of the modern Ukrainian language. The significance of Shevchenko's creative genius for the Ukrainian and wider Slavic culture has led some to compare his figure to that of Robert Burns.

Shevchenko was born into a poor family of serfs during the period of Russian rule over Ukraine. In his youth, he demonstrated a talent for art and became a fellow of the Imperial Academy of Arts in Saint Petersburg. After his return to Ukraine, he joined the emerging national movement. Exiled to Central Asia due to his association with the Brotherhood of Saints Cyril and Methodius, Shevchenko continued to create art and poetry despite prohibitions, and his figure attained fame among the liberal-minded circles of the Russian Empire. He wrote poetry in Ukrainian and prose (nine novellas, a diary and his autobiography) in Russian. Freed from exile after the onset of liberal reforms of Alexander II, he was barred from settling in Ukraine and died in Saint Petersburg.

== Life ==
=== Childhood and youth ===
Taras Hryhorovych Shevchenko was born on 9 March [O.S. 25 February] 1814 (Note: Note #10 in the parish register of Morintsy for 1814 (preserved in the Taras Shevchenko National Museum): "In the year one thousand eight hundred fourteen, on the twenty fifth of February, a son, Taras, was born to the resident of the village Morinets Grigori Shevchenko and his wife Catherine...") in Morintsy, a village in the Zvenigorodka uezd of Kiev Governorate, about 20 years after the third partition of Poland, wherein the territory of Ukraine where he was born was annexed by the Russian Empire. He was the third child after his sister Kateryna and brother Mykyta; his younger siblings were a brother, Yosyp, and a sister, Maria, who was born blind. Their parents were Kateryna Shevchenko (née Boiko) and Hryhoriy Ivanovych Shevchenko, former subjects of the Polish-Lithuanian Commonwealth who became serf peasants, working the land owned by Vasily Engelhardt, a nephew of Russian statesman Grigory Potemkin. According to Shevchenko's biographer Oleksandr Konysky, Hryhoriy's original surname had been Hrushivskyi (Ukrainian: Грушівський), and the name Shevchenko (denoting descent from a shoemaker, Ukrainian: Швець, Shvets) was applied to the family due to one of their ancestors being active in the trade. Hryhoriy and his father themselves worked as wheelwrights.

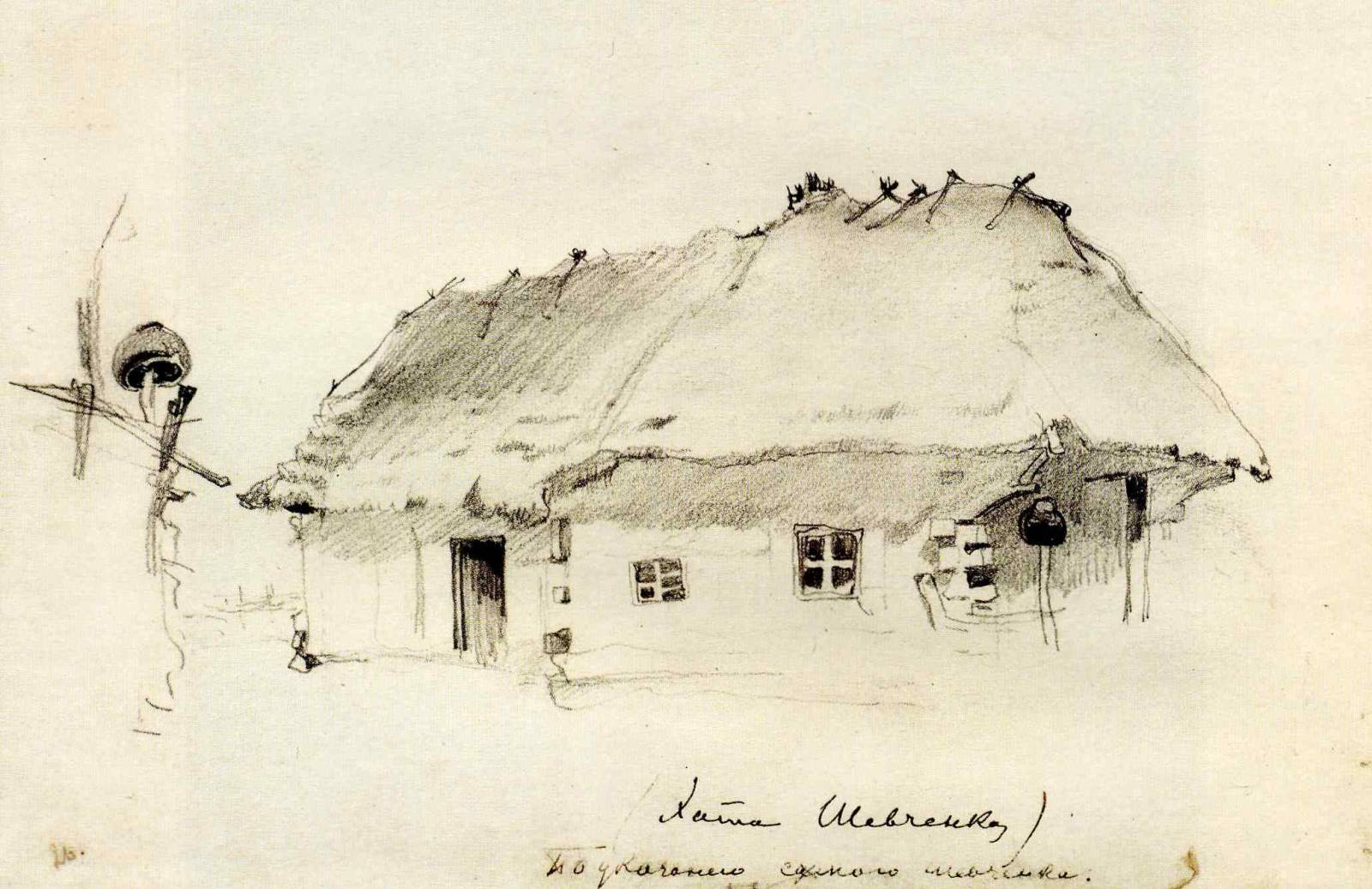
Taras Shevchenko's pencil sketch of his parents' house in Kyrylivka, drawn in 1843

In 1816, the family moved to Kyrylivka (modern Shevchenkove), another village owned by Engelhardt, where Taras's father and grandfather had been born. The boy grew up in the village. Once, he went looking for "the pillars that prop up the sky" and got lost. Chumaks (travelling merchants) who met the boy took him back to the village. From 1822, Shevchenko was sent to a school, where he was taught to read and write. His teacher was the precentor of the village church, whose nickname was "Sovhyr". He was a harsh disciplinarian, who had a tradition of birching the children in his class every Saturday.

On 1 September [O.S. 20 August] 1823 Kateryna Shevchenko died. The widowed Hryhoriy, left to look after six children aged from thirteen to four, had little choice but to remarry. He was married to Oksana Tereshchenko, a widow from Morintsy, who had three children of her own. As a child, Shevchenko was cared for by his elder sister Kateryna, who had a great influence on him.

To my son Taras I leave nothing. He will not be an ordinary man: he will turn out either someone very great, or a great scamp, thus in either case my legacy will be of no account to him.

— Reported last words of Hryhoriy Shevchenko, the poet's father, on his deathbed, as presented by Dmytro Doroshenko

When Hryhoriy Shevchenko became a chumak, Taras travelled twice with his father and his older brother away from his neighbourhood and, for the first time in his life, on to the open steppe. Hryhoriy died from a chill on 2 April [O.S. 21 March] 1825, and for a period the children's stepmother ruled the family, treating Taras and those siblings still at the family home with great cruelty, until she was expelled by their grandfather, Ivan Shevchenko. The only family member to stand for him during that time was his sister Iryna, who was two years younger.

For a period Taras lived with his grandfather and his father's brother Pavlo, and was made to work as a swineherd and a groom's assistant. At the age of 12, Taras left home to work as a student assistant and a servant for a drunkard named Bohorsky, who had replaced Sovhyr as the village precentor and teacher and was even more violent than his predecessor. One of Shevchenko's duties was to read psalms over the dead. He was treated still more violently by Bohorsky once the boy's stepmother became his mistress.

It is true, Oksana, alien and black-browed,
That you will not remember the orphan
Who, in a grey jacket, was so happy
To see a wonder - your beauty,
Whom you taught, without talk or words,
How to speak with the eyes, soul and heart,
With whom you smiled, cried, and worried,
To whom you loved to sing a song about Petrus.
You will recall... Oksana, Oksana!
But I still cry today and I still worry,
I pour out my tears for the little Mariana
While I look at you and pray for you.
Remember, Oksana, alien and black-browed,
And deck sister Mariana with flowers.
Sometimes smile happily at Petrus
And, even jokingly, remember what happened.

— Taras Shevchenko, Mariana, the Nun (1841)

In February 1827, the 13-year-old Shevchenko escaped from the village and worked for a few days for a deacon in Lysianka, before moving on to Tarasivka. Frustrated in his attempts to become an artist, he returned to his home village. There Taras found employment as a shepherd. At around this time, Shevchenko met Oksana Kovalenko, a "curly" girl, who became his first love. Their acquaintance did not result in any serious relationship, but bore great significance for Taras, and Oksana would later be mentioned in a number of his works, including a dedication he later wrote in the poem Mariana, the nun.

There is evidence that during this period of his life, Shevchenko was trained by his older brother Mykola to become a wheelwright, and that he also lived with and worked for the family of Hryhoriy Koshytsia, the Kyrylivka priest, who treated Taras well. His duties included driving the priest's son to school, and transporting fruit to markets in Burty and Shpola.

=== Life as a servant of Pavel Engelhardt ===
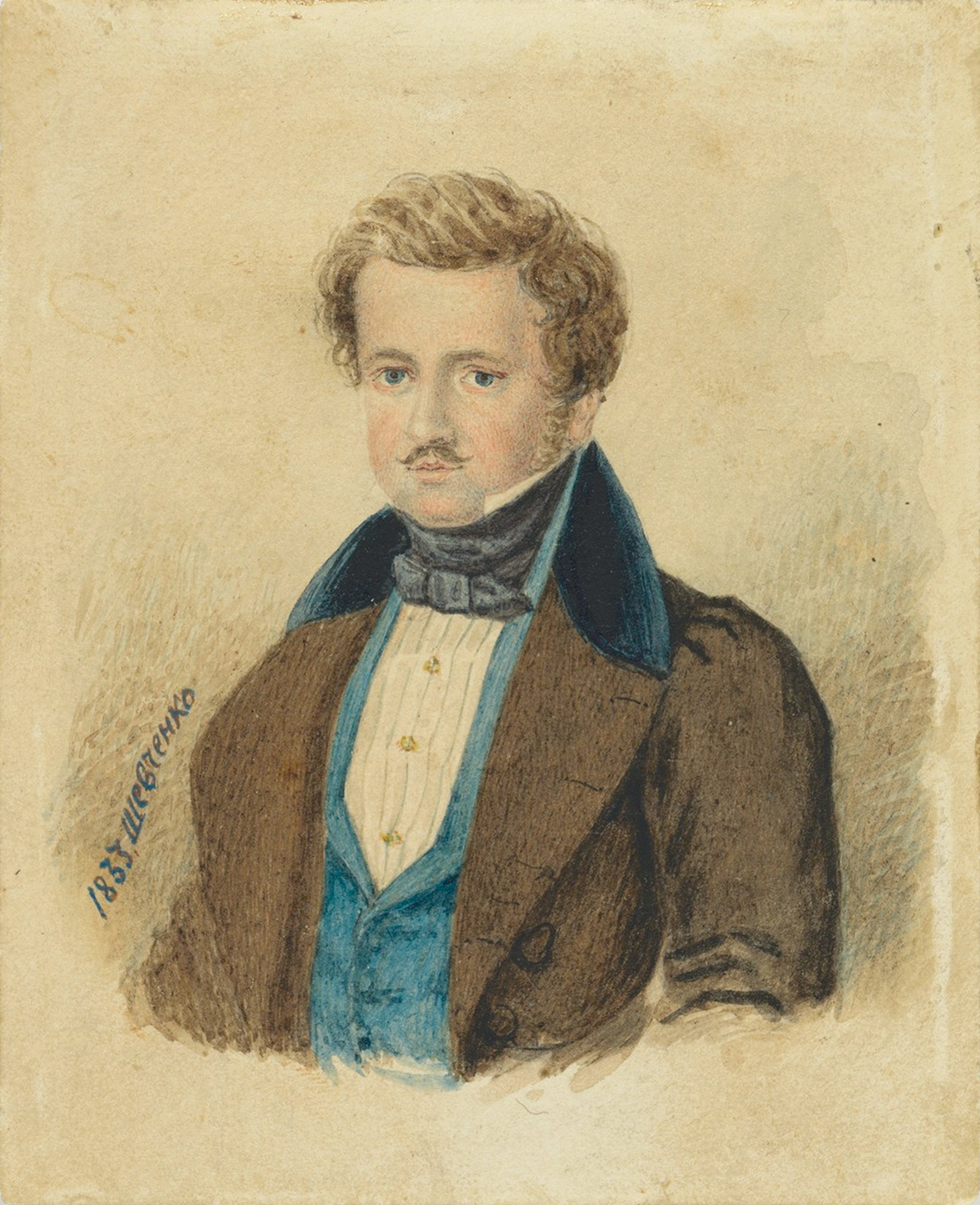
Taras Shevchenko. Portrait of Pavlo Engelgardt (1833), National Museum Taras Shevchenko

In 1828, Engelhardt died, and one of his sons, Pavel Engelhardt, became the Shevchenko family's new landlord. Taras Shevchenko, then aged 14, was trained to become a kitchen servant and the kozachok (court servant) of his new master at the Vilshana estates. There he saw for the first time the luxuries of the Russian nobility.

In 1829, Shevchenko was part of Engelhardt's retinue that travelled to Warsaw, where his regiment was based. By the end of 1829 they had reached Vilno (modern Vilnius). On 18 December [O.S. 6 December] 1829, Engelhardt caught Shevchenko at night painting a portrait of the Cossack general Matvei Platov. He boxed the boy's ears and ordered him to be whipped. When the party reached Warsaw, Engelhardt arranged for his servant to be apprenticed to a painter-decorator, who, recognising the boy's artistic talents, recommended he receive lessons from the Polish painter and professional artist, Franciszek Ksawery Lampi.

While studying art in Vilno and Warsaw, the 16-year old Taras, still a serf, fell in love with Dunia Gusikowska, a Polish noble girl. According to his later confession, that love affair for the first time awoke in him the idea of equality between people from different social classes.

When the November Uprising broke out in 1830, Engelhardt and his regiment were forced to leave Warsaw. His servants, including Shevchenko, were later expelled from the city, forced to leave Polish territory under armed guard, and then made their way to St. Petersburg. Upon arriving there, Shevchenko returned to the life of being a page-boy. His artistic training was delayed for a year, after which he was permitted to study for four years with the painter Vasiliy Shiriayev, a man who proved to be much more cruel and controlling than his master in Warsaw. The summer nights were light enough for Shevchenko to visit the city's Summer Garden, where he drew the statues.

In his novel Artist, Shevchenko described that during the pre-academical period he painted such works as Apollo Belvedere, Fraklete, Heraclitus, Architectural barelief, and Mask of Fortune. He participated in the painting of the Bolshoi Theatre as an apprentice. The composition Alexander of Macedon shows trust towards his doctor Philip was created for a contest of the Imperial Academy of Arts in 1830.

=== Liberation from serfdom ===
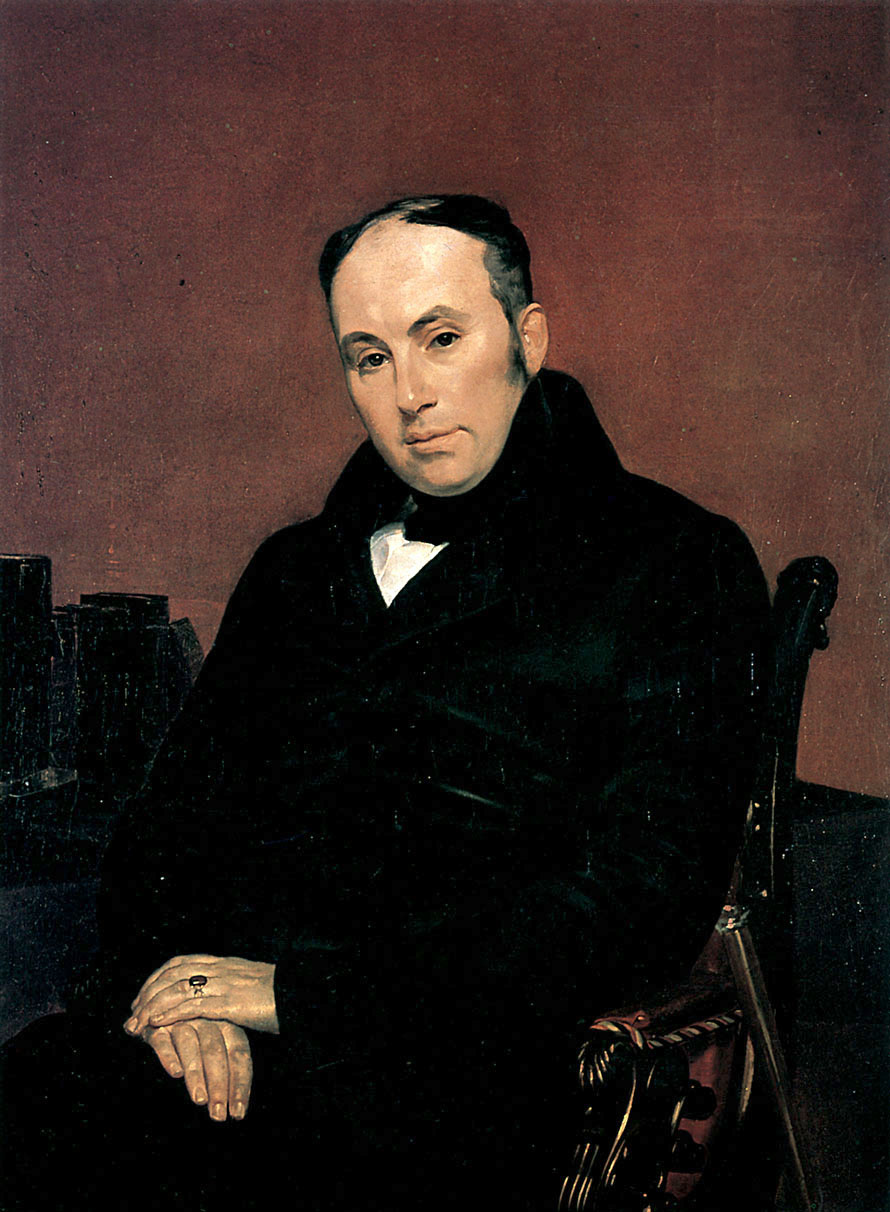
Karl Briullov, Portrait of the poet V.A. Zhukovsky (1837/8), National Museum Taras Shevchenko

During one of his copying sessions in the city's Summer Gardens, Shevchenko made the acquaintance of a young Ukrainian artist, Ivan Soshenko, a painter and a student of the Imperial Academy of Arts, who came from Bohuslav, close to Shevchenko's home village. Soshenko showed an interest in Shevchenko's drawings, and recognised the young man's talent. He was allowed to receive drawing and watercolour painting lessons from Soshenko on weekends, and when he had spare time during the week. Shevchenko made such progress as a portraitist that Engelhardt asked him to portray several of his mistresses.

Soshenko took Shevchenko to Saint Petersburg's art galleries, including the Hermitage. He introduced him to other compatriots, such as the writer and poet Yevhen Hrebinka, the art historian Vasyl Hryhorovych, and the Russian painter Alexey Venetsianov. Through these men, around June 1832, Shevchenko was introduced to the most fashionable painter of the day, the artist Karl Briullov. Briullov took an interest in Shevchenko, praising his work and indicating a willingness to take him on as a student. However, as a serf, Shevchenko was ineligible to study under Briullov at the Academy, who requested his freedom from Engelhardt. The request was met with a refusal, which enraged Briullov.

Engelhardt was persuaded to release his servant on condition that a fee of 2500 rubles was paid. To raise this sum, Briullov painted a portrait of the Russian poet Vasily Zhukovsky as a lottery prize for the imperial family; the winning lottery ticket was drawn by the tsarina. (Note: The letters by Zhukovsky asking for payment were illustrated by his own drawings, with captions: This is Mr Shevchenko. He is talking to himself: 'I would like to paint a picture, but my master has ordered me to sweep the floor.' / He is holding his paintbrush in one hand and a broom in the other. He is very upset. / Here Briullov is painting Zhukovsky's portrait. In the distance Shevchenko is sweeping the floor. For the last time. / These are Shevchenko and Zhukovsky. Both are turning somersaults out of joy.') Engelhardt signed the paperwork that released Shevchenko from serfdom on 5 May [O.S. 23 April] 1838.

=== Initial success ===
==== Paintings and drawings ====
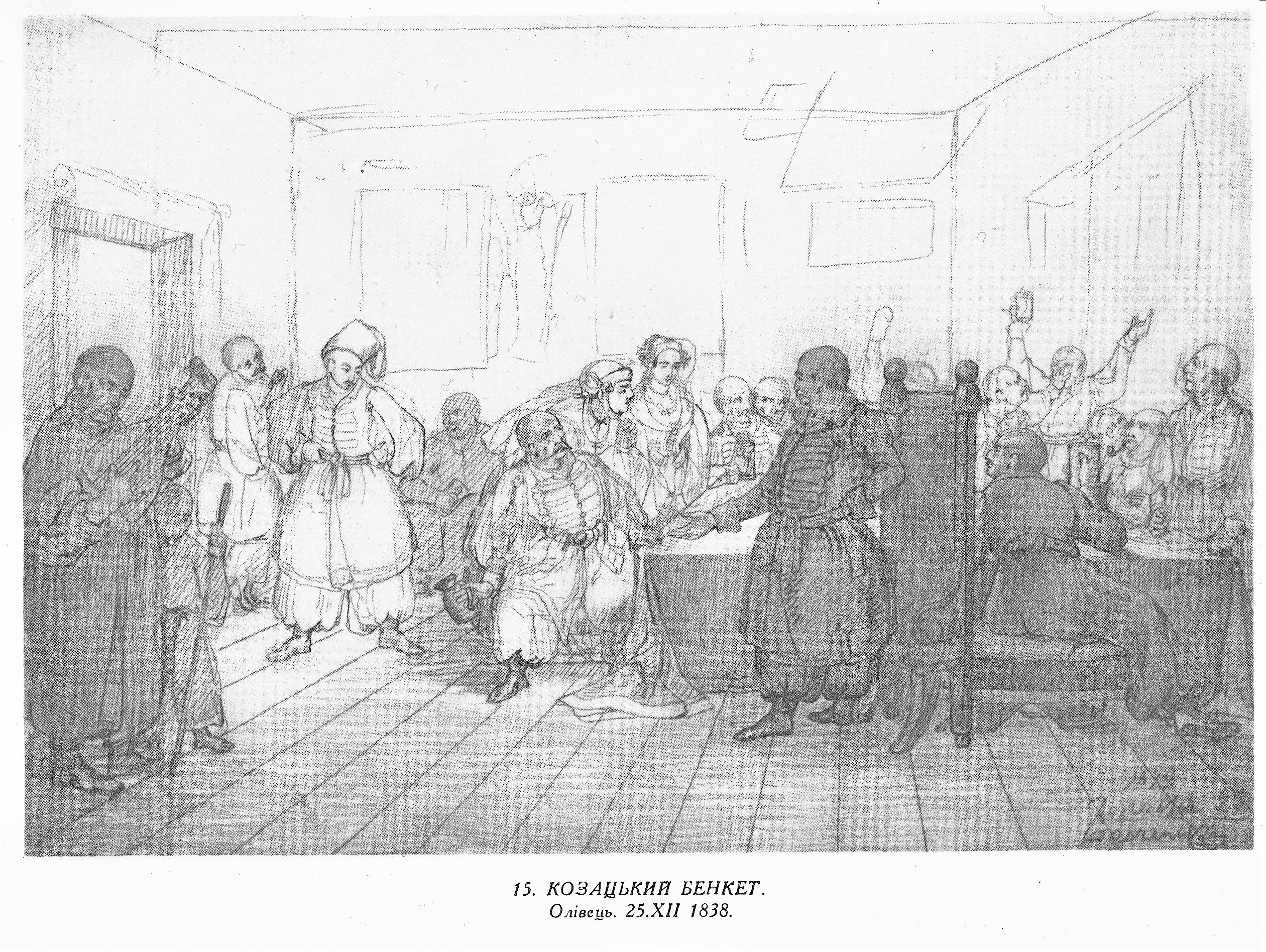
Cossack Banquet (pencil on paper, 1838), National Museum Taras Shevchenko

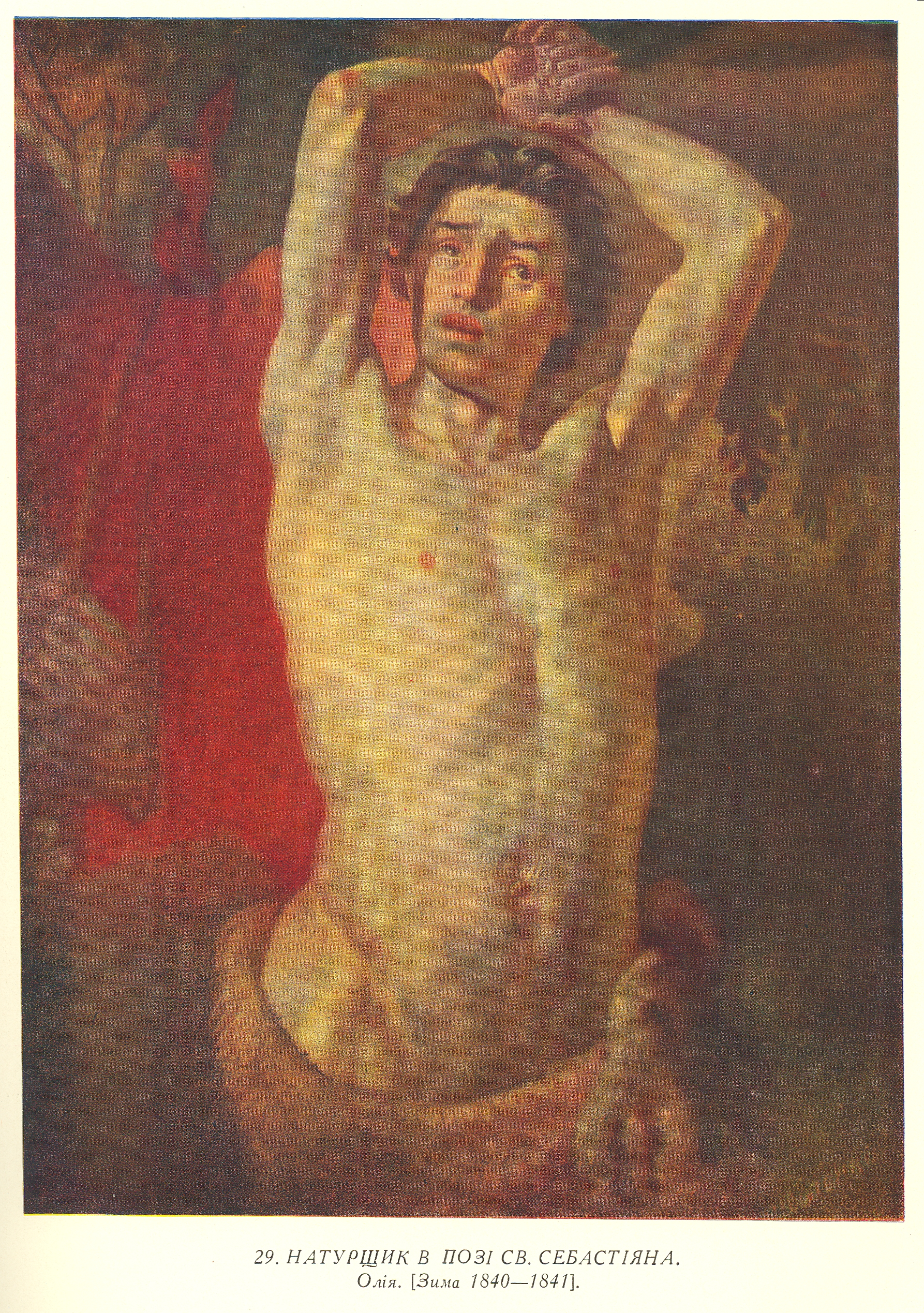
Model in the Pose of St. Sebastian

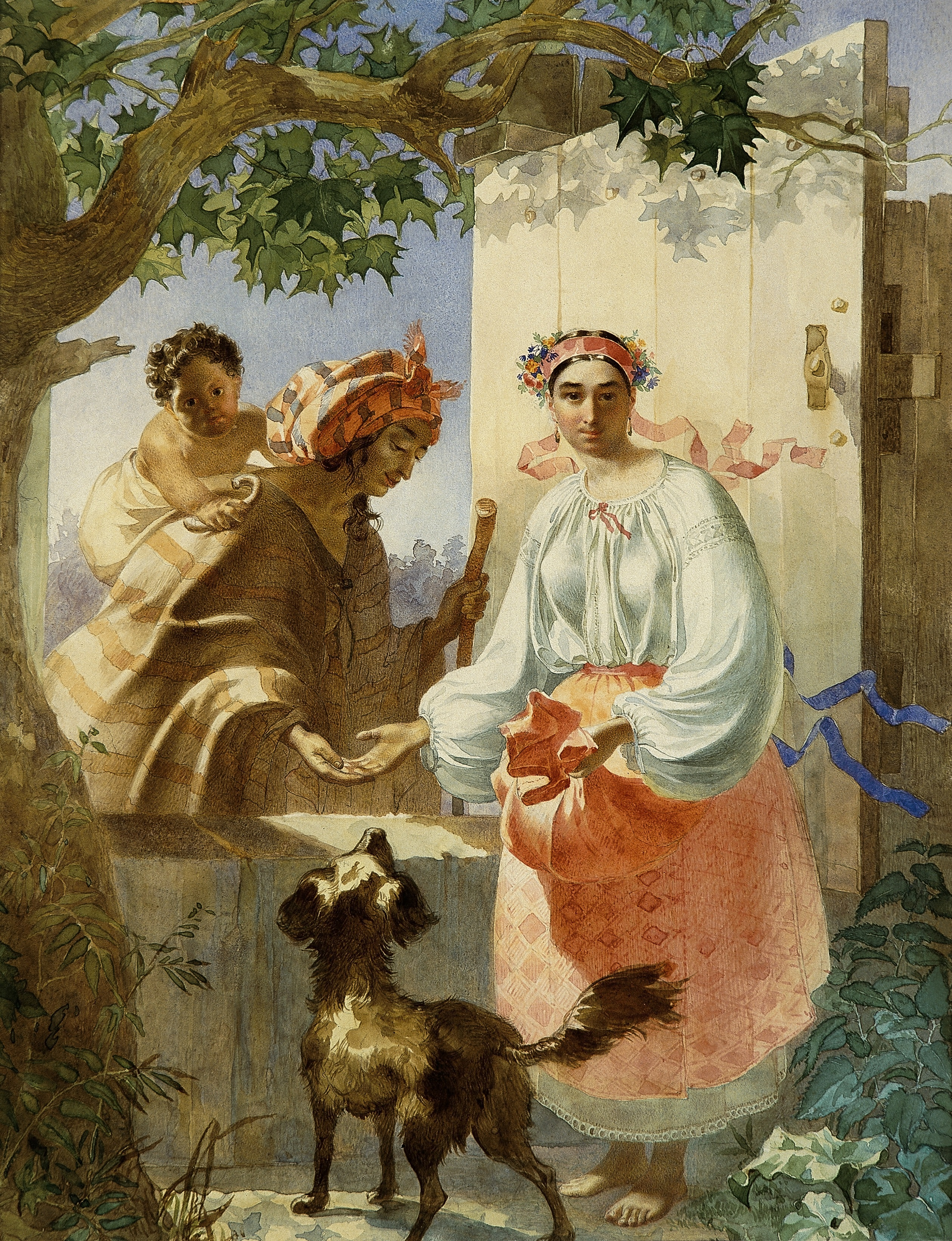
Gypsy Fortune Teller (1841)

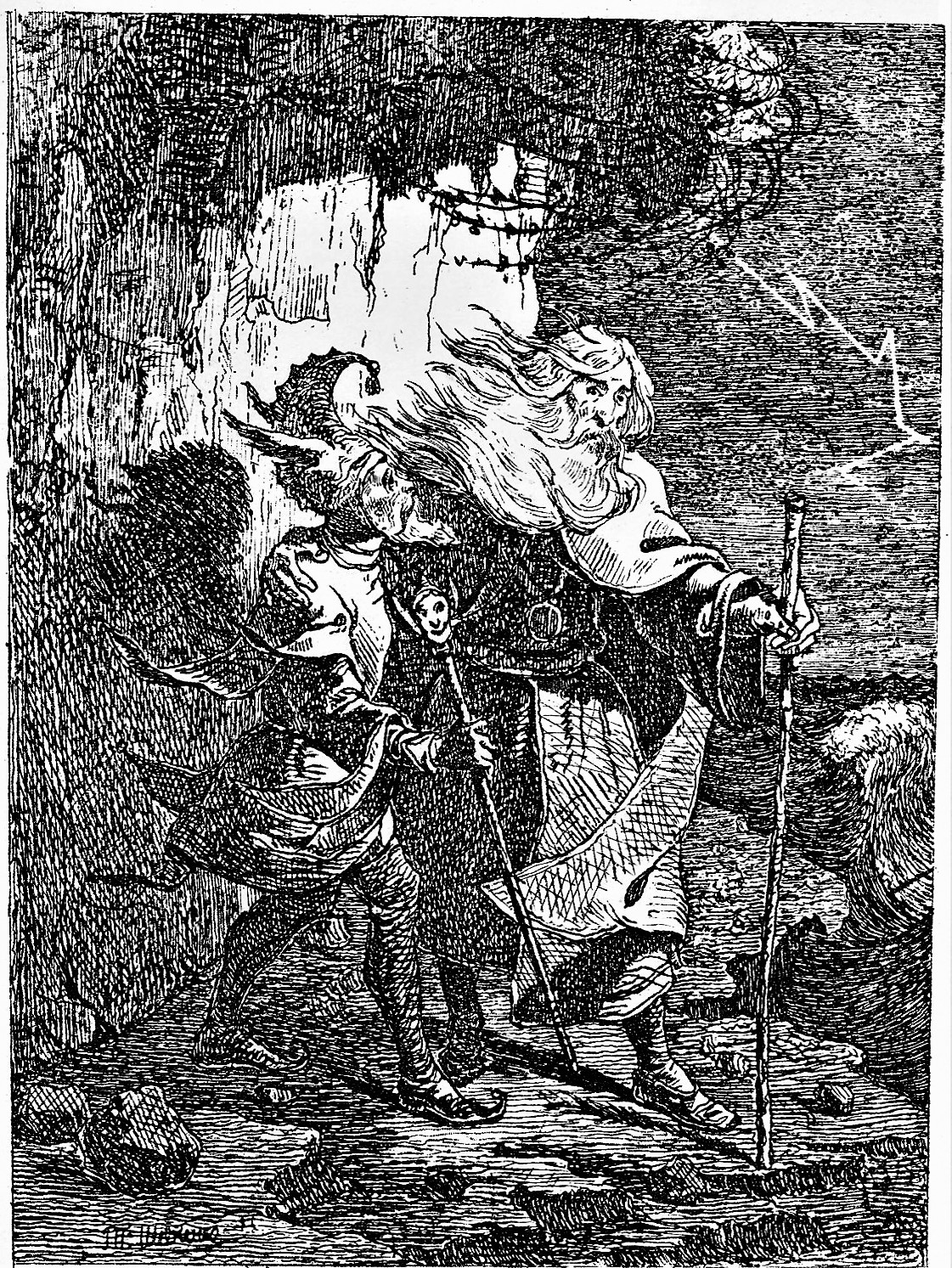
An illustration of King Lear, produced in Galvanography (1843)

After he became a student of the Imperial Academy of Arts, with Briullov as his mentor, Shevchenko spent most of his time at the academy and in Briullov's studio. Together they attended literary and musical evenings, and visited writers and artists. Shevchenko's social life enriched and expanded his horizons and stimulated his creativity. His friends during this period included Yakov Kuharenko, a writer and officer of the Black Sea Cossack Host who was to become his friend for life, and the artist Karl Joachim,

From June to November 1838, Shevchenko's examination marks improved enough to allow him to join a compositional drawings class. An early drawing from this class, Cossack Banquet, was completed in December that year. The following month his work was recognised by the Imperial Society for the Encouragement of the Arts, who agreed to pay him a monthly maintenance fee of 30 rubles.

After his liberation from serfdom in 1838, Shevchenko shared a flat in St. Petersburg with Soshenko, and both fell in love with Mania, a niece of their landlord. This caused a conflict between the two friends, as a result of which Shevchenko had to move. Mania continued to date Taras at the new location, but the relationship didn't end happily, and he and Soshenko soon reconciled.

In April 1839, Shevchenko was awarded a silver medal by the Council of the Academy. He began to master the technique of oil painting, with The Model in the Pose of St. Sebastian being among his earliest attempts. From November, he became seriously ill with typhus. That year, he received another silver medal, this time for his oil painting The Beggar Boy Giving Bread to a Dog. In September 1841, the Academy of Arts awarded Shevchenko his third silver medal, for the painting The Gypsy Fortune Teller. The following May, continual absenteeism from classes forced the Society for the Encouragement of Artists to exclude him from among its free boarders. To earn an income he produced book illustrations, such as for Nikolai Nadezhdin's story The Power of Will, Oleksandr Bashutskyi's publication Ours, written off from nature by the Russians, an edition of Wolfgang Franz von Kobell's Galvanography (1843), and a book by Nikolai Polevoy, Russian Generals (1845).

In the autumn of 1842, Shevchenko planned a sea trip to Sweden and Denmark, but due to illness, he returned home after reaching Reval (modern Tallinn).

==== Early poetry ====
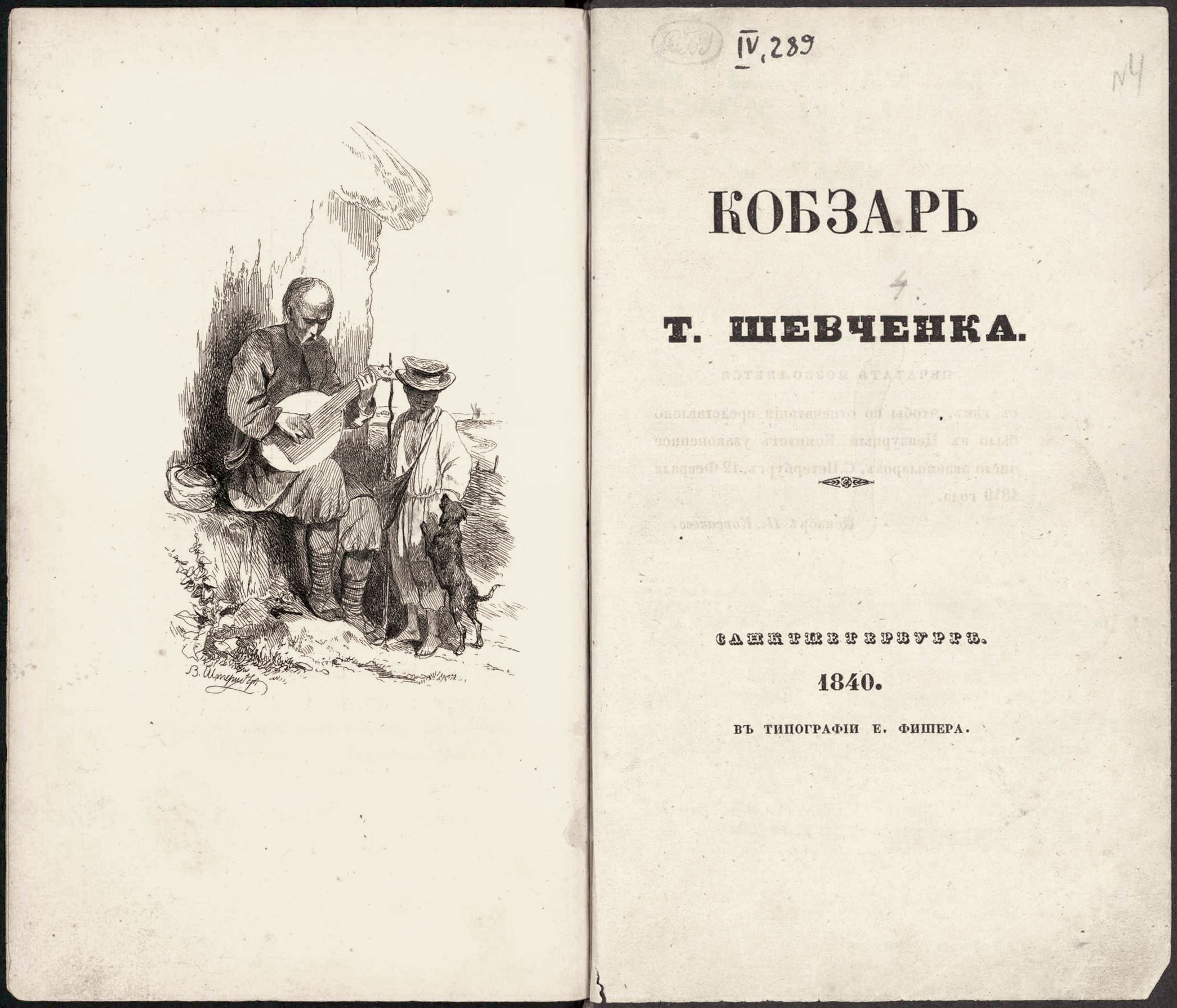
The first illustration and the title page from Kobzar (1840)

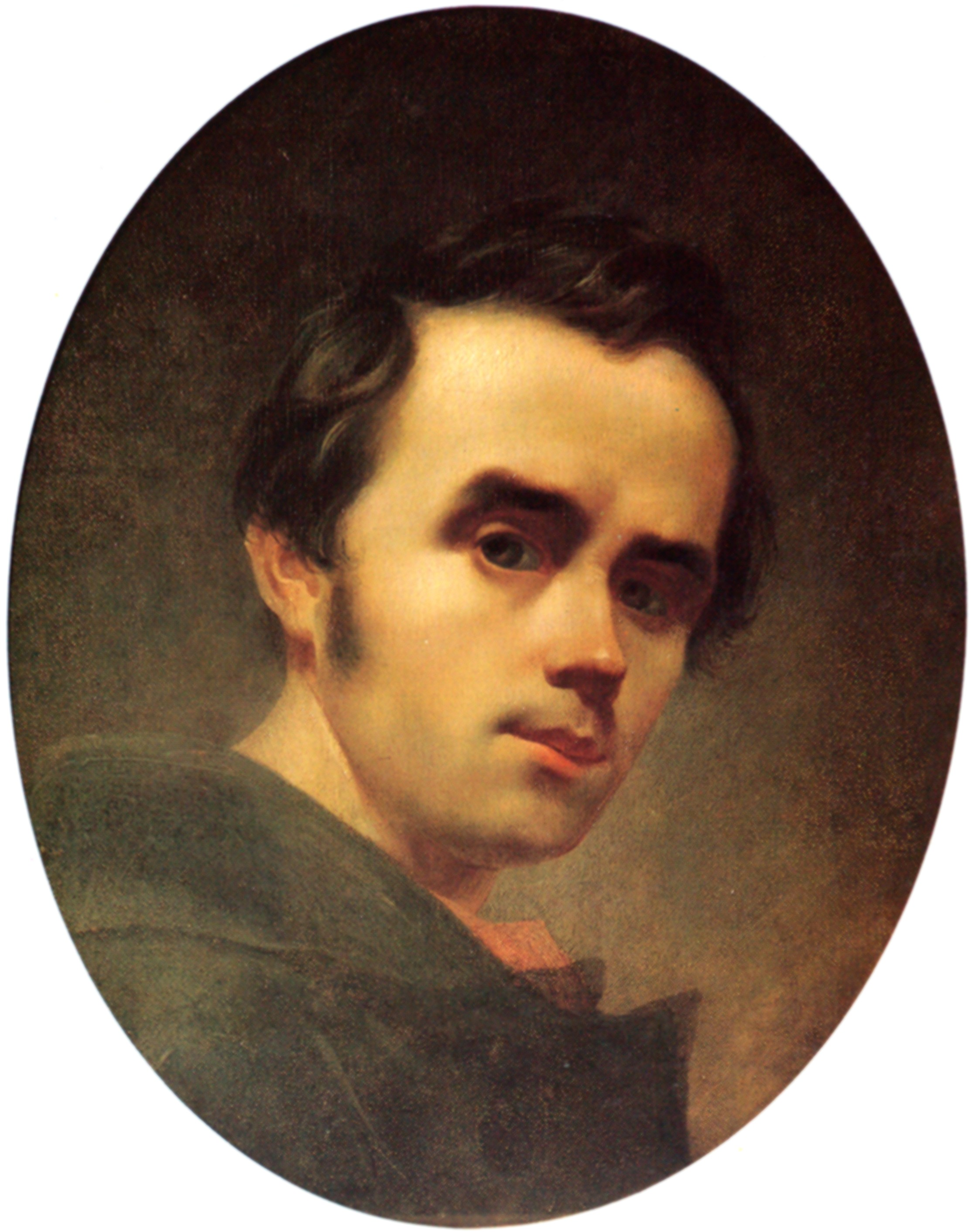
Shevchenko's self-portrait from 1841, one year after Kobzar was published

At the end of 1839, Shevchenko met the sculptor and art teacher Ivan Martos, who showed great interest in his poems. He offered to publish them, but Shevchenko did not immediately agree. Hrebinka took an active and direct part in the publication of Kobzar (1840); it was he who submitted the manuscript to the St. Petersburg censorship committee. Kobzar sold out. It did not openly call for revolutionary actions, but it expressed a protest against social injustice and a desire for a free life.

In March 1840, Hrebinka submitted the manuscript of the almanac Lastivka to the censors, which also included Shevchenko's Prychynna and the poems The wind is raging, the wind is raging! and Water flows into the blue sea. In 1841, Shevchenko paid for his epic poem Haidamaky. The poem was met with sharp criticism by the literary critic Vissarion Belinsky; in the magazine Otechestvennye Zapiski he criticized Shevchenko's "inclination to romantic pompous ingenuity". Other poems produced by Shevchenko during this period include "Maryana the Nun", "Drowned", and "Blind Man".

==== Plays ====
Shevchenko's play Blind Beauty, written c. 1841, has not survived. In 1842, he released a part of the tragedy Mykyta Haidai and, in 1843 he completed the drama Nazar Stodolia.

=== Trips to Ukraine ===
While residing in Saint Petersburg, Shevchenko made three trips to Ukraine: in 1843, 1845, and 1846. The difficult conditions Ukrainians endured had a profound impact on the poet-painter. Shevchenko visited his siblings, still enserfed, and other relatives. He met with prominent Ukrainian writers and intellectuals Yevhen Hrebinka, Panteleimon Kulish, and Mykhaylo Maksymovych, and was befriended by the princely Repnin family, especially Varvara, the daughter of Little Russian governor-general Nikolai Repnin. The princess especially adored Shevchenko's singing, and the two developed an intimate friendship. In a dedication to one of his poems Shevchenko compared Varvara to an angel, and there were rumours that some of his Russian-language works were composed specifically for her.

In May 1843, Shevchenko travelled to Ukraine, where he met as many intellectuals, poets, and artists as possible, including the future Brotherhood of Saints Cyril and Methodius member Vasyl Bilozersky. During his stay in Kyiv, Shevchenko sketched the city's historical sights and landscapes. After a month he went to Yahotyn, where he befriended the Repnin family. In October 1843, he wrote his poem "The Dug Grave", after visiting recent excavations of burial mounds that many Ukrainians considered to be symbolic of the heroic past of the Cossacks.

During the same year Shevchenko was introduced to members of the informal "Mug-Watering Society" (Russian: Общество мочемордия) organized by Pyriatyn landowner Viktor Zakrevsky, a former hussar. The society's participants competed in their drinking abilities and developed an entire system of titles and awards provided to its members depending on the amount of alcohol they were able to consume. Varvara Repnina strongly warned Shevchenko against associating with Zakrevsky and his circle.

In autumn of 1843 Taras visited Kyrylivka, seeing his brothers and sisters for the first time in 14 years. During his stay in the village he met Fedosia, a 16-year old daughter of the local priest Hryhoriy Koshytsia. Next year he returned to Kyrylivka, planning to get engaged with her. However, Fedosia's parents opposed the marriage due to Shevchenko being their former servant. Fedosia later suffered from mental illness and died unmarried.

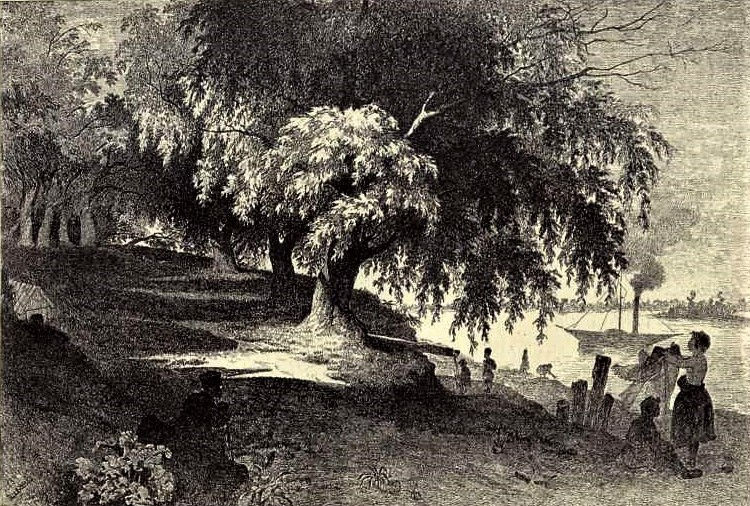
In Kiev, one of the six etchings Shevchenko included in Picturesque Ukraine (1844)

In 1844, distressed by the condition of Ukrainian regions in the Russian Empire, Shevchenko decided to capture some of his homeland's historical ruins and cultural monuments in an album of etchings, which he called Picturesque Ukraine. Shevchenko planned the album to consist of his annotated etchings of places and events connected with Ukraine and its past, and use the proceeds to buy his family their freedom. The Society for the Encouragement of Artists gave him 300 rubles to help produce Picturesque Ukraine, but due to his poor planning and lack of business skills, few of the intended etchings with their accompanying text were published, and not enough money was generated from sales to fulfill his dream of buying his siblings' freedom. Only the first six etchings were printed because of the lack of means to continue. An album of watercolors from historical places and pencil drawings was compiled in 1845.

=== Exile ===
==== Arrest and investigation ====
On 22 March 1845, the Council of the Academy of Arts granted Shevchenko the title of a non-classed artist. He again traveled to Ukraine, where he was appointed teacher of drawing at Kiev University, and met historian Mykola Kostomarov and other members of the Brotherhood of Saints Cyril and Methodius, a clandestine society also known as Ukrainian-Slavic society and dedicated to the political liberalization of the Empire and its transformation into a federation-like polity of Slavic nations.

In January 1847 Shevchenko was an usher at the wedding of Panteleimon Kulish and Olena Bilozerska. His arrest on 5 April 1847 took place when he was travelling to Kiev in order to attend the wedding of Kostomarov, who, unknowingly to him, had himself been put under arrest along with other members of the Brotherhood of Sts. Cyril and Methodius.

...Scowling, tall,
Here comes himself, the tsar,
To stretch his legs; and at his side
His empress struts and preens,
All wrinkled like a dried-up prune
And like a beanpole lean,
While every time she steps, her head
Goes jiggling on her neck.
Is this the beauty rare they praise?!
Poor thing, you are a wreck!
And silly I, not having seen
You once with my own eyes,
Accepted what your scribblers wrote,
Believed your poets' lies.

— Excerpt from Dream (1844) translated by John Weir

Shevchenko's 1844 poem Dream, which described the social and national oppression of Ukrainians by the Russian upper classes, became subject of a scandal after its copies had been confiscated from the Brotherhood's members. Tsar Nicholas I personally read the poem; according to Vissarion Belinsky, the tsar, who was reported to know Ukrainian very well, laughed and chuckled whilst reading the section of Shevchenko's text dedicated to himself, but his mood quickly turned to bitter hatred when he read the part describing his wife, as Shevchenko had mocked her frumpy appearance and facial tics, which she had developed fearing the Decembrist uprising and its plans to kill her family. After reading the section, the Tsar indignantly stated "I suppose he had reasons not to be on terms with me, but what has she done to deserve this?"

In the official report of Orlov Shevchenko was accused of composing poetry in "Little-Russian language" (an archaic Russian name for the Ukrainian language) of outrageous content, instead of being grateful to be redeemed out of serfdom. In the report, Orlov listed his supposed crimes as advocating and inspiring Ukrainian nationalists, alleging enslavement and misfortune of Ukraine, glorifying the Hetman Administration (Cossack Hetmanate) and Cossack liberties and that he "with incredible audacity poured slander and bile on persons of Imperial House".

While under investigation, Shevchenko was imprisoned in Saint Petersburg in casemates of the 3rd Department of Imperial Chancellery on Panteleimonovskaya Street (today Pestelia str., 9).

==== Arrival to Central Asia ====
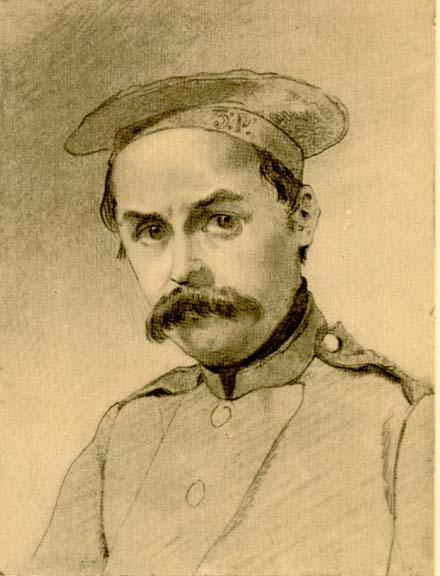
Shevchenko's self-portrait as a soldier, 1847

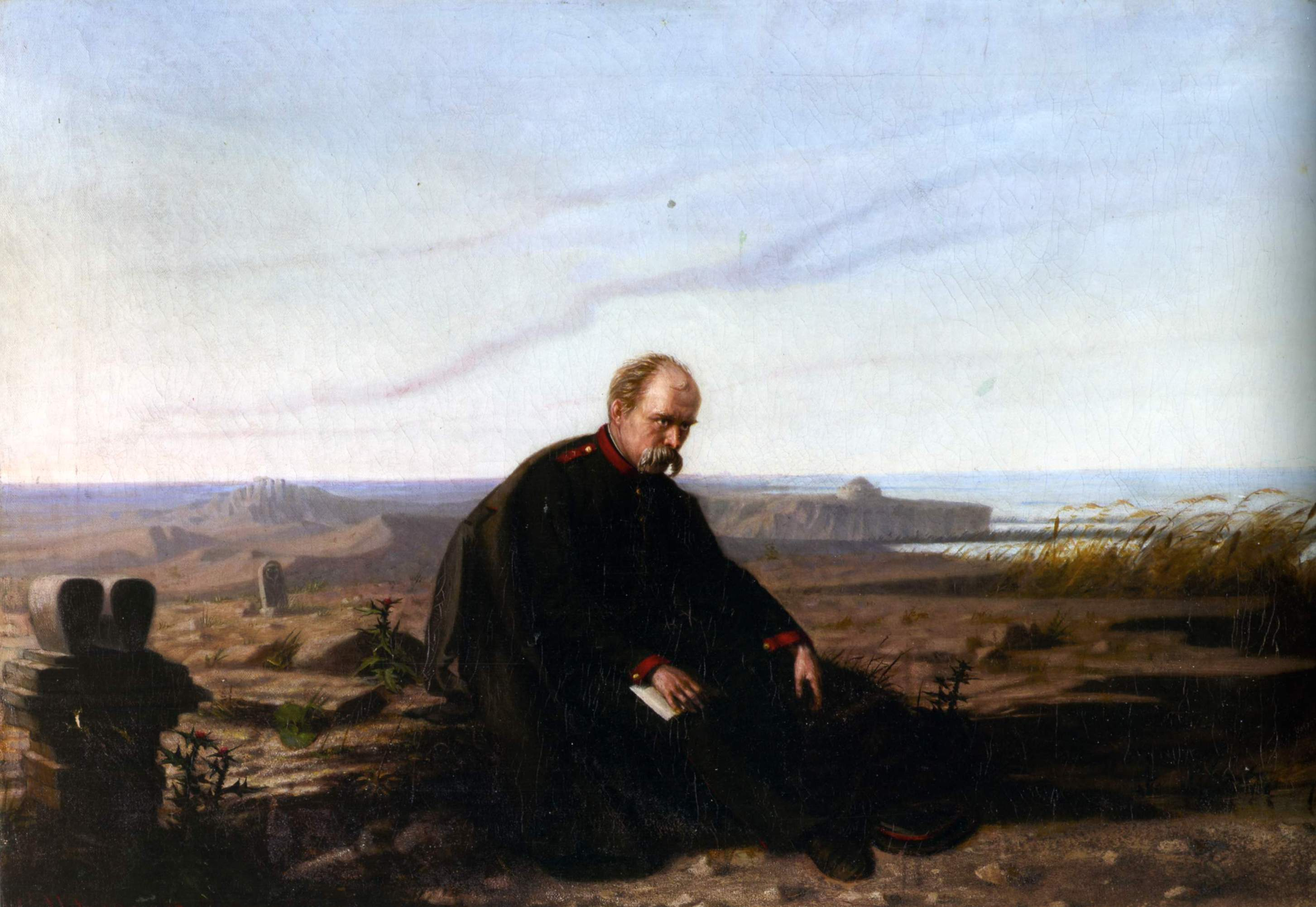
Exiled Shevchenko on an imagined portrait by Kornylo Ustiyanovych

After being convicted, Shevchenko was exiled as a private to the Russian military garrison in Orenburg at Orsk, near the Ural Mountains. Tsar Nicholas I personally confirmed his sentence, and added to it, "Under the strictest surveillance, without the right to write or paint." He was subsequently sent on a forced march from Saint Petersburg to Orenburg and Orsk.

According to data from the registry of Orsk fortress, where Shevchenko was sent to undergo military service as part of his sentence, he had a height of 2 arshin and 5 vershoks (164,5 cm), had dark straw hair and dark grey eyes. Having previously survived typhus, in exile Shevchenko started suffering from rheumatism and scurvy. The illness, exacerbated by poor living conditions and harsh military service, contributed to the decline of his psychological condition. During that period Shevchenko found his joy in reading letters sent to him by his old friends and acquaintances. He was eventually permitted to make drawings, which along with poetry allowed him to improve his moral state.

==== Aral expedition ====
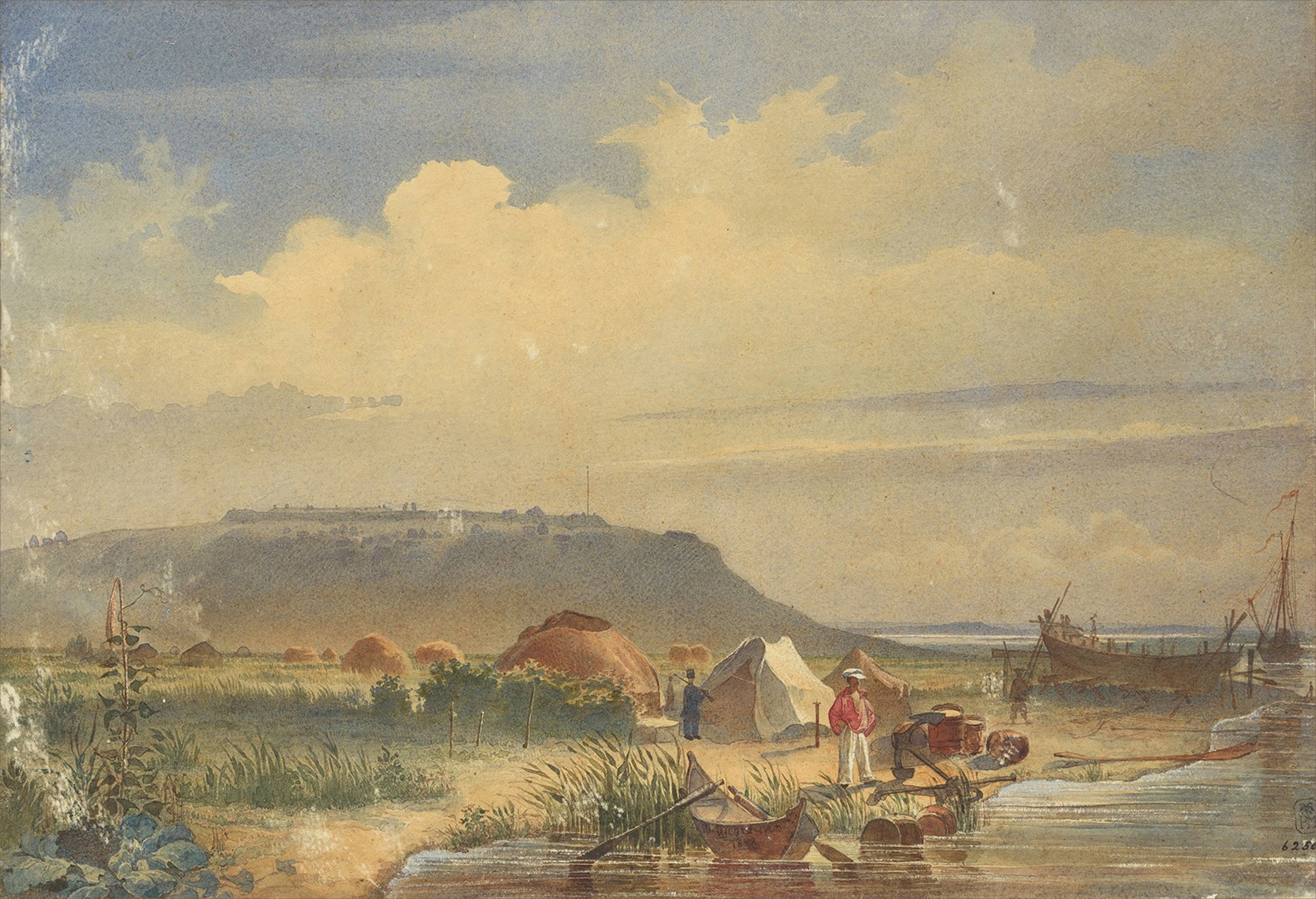
Shevchenko's self-portrait (in white cap) at the Syr Darya bank, June 1848

The following year, 1848, Shevchenko was assigned to undertake the first Russian naval expedition of the Aral Sea on the ship "Konstantin", under the command of Lieutenant Butakov. Although officially a common private, he was effectively treated as an equal by the other members of the expedition. He was tasked to sketch various landscapes around the coast of the Aral Sea. After an 18-month voyage (1848–49), Shevchenko returned with his album of drawings and paintings to Orenburg. Most of those drawings were created for a detailed account of the expedition. Nevertheless, he created many unique works of art about the Aral Sea nature and Kazakh people at a time when Russian conquest of Central Asia had begun in the middle of the nineteenth century.

During the Aral expedition, Shevchenko, like other of its participants, suffered from heat, thirst and lack of food. After crossing the Karakum desert on foot, his party arrived to Kosaral fortress. Shevchenko was met by Ural Cossacks, who served in the local garrison, with great reverence, as his thick beard grown during the campaign caused him to be mistaken for an Old Believer priest. The lack of post deliveries to the fortress caused him great discomfort, which he overcame by writing new poetry. By the end of 1849 Shevchenko was allowed to visit Orenburg, where he met a number of friends, getting inspiration for new poetic works. However, news about Shevchenko's planned involvement into a new expedition to the Aral Sea, as well as a new ban on drawing, once again led him to fall into despair. In a letter to Varvara Repnina dated with 1 January 1850, he doubted that he would ever see Ukraine once again.

==== Imprisonment at Novopetrovsk ====
Following a conflict with one of officers serving in Orenburg, in April 1850 Shevchenko was arrested and sent to Orsk on accusations of wearing civilian clothes and violating the ban on drawing, despite drawing having been one of his tasks during the Aral expedition. The new arrest resulted in his eventual transportation to one of the worst penal settlements, the remote fortress of Novopetrovsk at Mangyshlak Peninsula on the Caspian Sea, where he arrived in October 1850. Qualified as a political prisoner, Shevchenko was subjected to strict drills and abuse by officers, which caused him great moral pain. To make matters worse, strict censorship prevented him from exchanging letters with his friends.

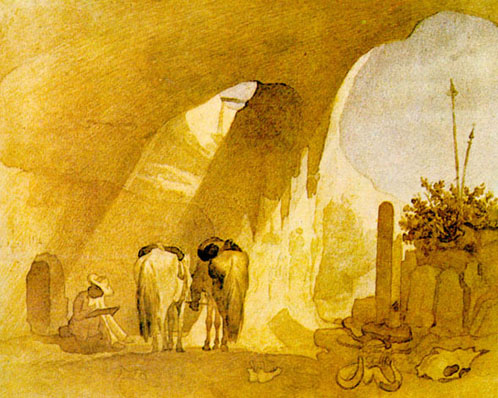
Grave of a mullah, 1851

In 1851, at the suggestion of fellow serviceman Bronisław Zaleski, lieutenant colonel Mayevsky assigned Shevchenko to the Mangyshlak (Karatau) geological expedition. In order to overcome the bans on artistic creativity, in 1853 Shevchenko worked on clay sculptures, creating a low relief and many statuettes, which did not survive during transportation. In 1854 he volunteered to paint an icon for the local church, but was denied permission by military authorities. One of the few positive experiences Shevchenko could enjoy during his time at Novopetrovsk was his acquaintance with Agata Uskova, the wife of the fortress commandant, to whom he developed romantic feelings.

=== Release from exile ===
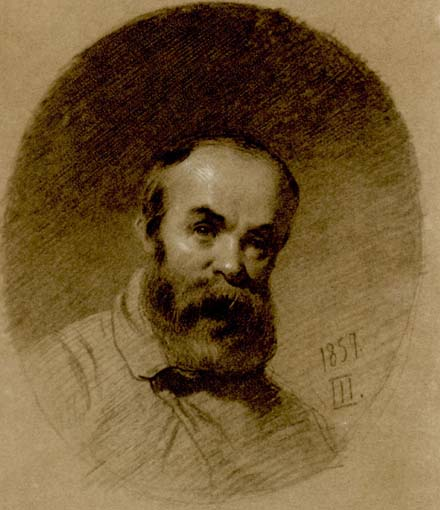
Shevchenko's self-portrait from 1857

In 1857, Shevchenko finally returned from exile after receiving amnesty from the new emperor, though he was not permitted to return to St. Petersburg and was forced to stay in Nizhniy Novgorod. There he started courting young actress Ekaterina Piunova, getting her acquainted with his friends and giving her lessons of Ukrainian language for her roles. However, Piunova's parents opposed the relationship due to the big age difference between the two, and she herself rejected the marriage proposal. On his birthday, 25 February 1858, Shevchenko received the news, that he had been permitted by authorities to return to St. Petersburg. After arriving to Moscow in March, he met his old friend Varvara Repnina, who would in her memoirs note Shevchenko's "apathetic" look and described him as "ruined" both physically and morally.

Following his return to St. Petersburg after 11 years of exile, Shevchenko was received by the educated classes as a celebrity. At a dinner in the house of Counts Tolstoy, he was praised by the hosts and guests for his great love to his native Ukraine and for not breaking in face of difficult life circumstances. Such praise from members of the high society surprised Shevchenko. Following his arrival to the capital, he would be regularly invited as a guest to homes of influential people, and got acquainted with a number of prominent artistic figures, among others Mikhail Mikeshin and Ivan Turgenev. Planning to continue his career in art, soon after returning to St. Petersburg Shevchenko visited the Hermitage in order to choose a painting for his first aquatint reproduction. In June 1858 he was provided two small rooms at the Arts Academy, which he used as a residence and a workshop. In order to finance his daily expenses, Shevchenko gave art lessons to children of his friends. He also reestablished contacts with Kostomarov, who visited St. Petersburg from Saratov.

In the winter of 1858, Shevchenko saw African-American Shakespearean actor Ira Aldridge perform with his troupe. Using translators, the two became good friends over discussions of art and music and their shared experiences of oppression. Shevchenko drew Aldridge's portrait. Aldridge was later gifted a portrait of Shevchenko by Mikhail Mikeshin.

In late 1858 or early 1859 Shevchenko met Marko Vovchok, the wife of Opanas Markovych, a former member of the Society of Sts. Cyril and Methodius. Impressed by Vovchok's works, the poet soon developed warm feelings for her, and dedicated one of his poems to the author.

Through his contacts in St. Petersburg, Shevchenko lobbied the liberation of his remaining family in Ukraine from serfdom, but Florowski, the landlord of Kyrylivka, issued a condition, according to which they had to leave the village in exchange for their freedom. The planned expulsion was eventually prevented by the Polish Rebellion of 1863, which forced imperial authorities to issue a number of concessions to recently liberated peasants.

=== Last visit to Ukraine ===
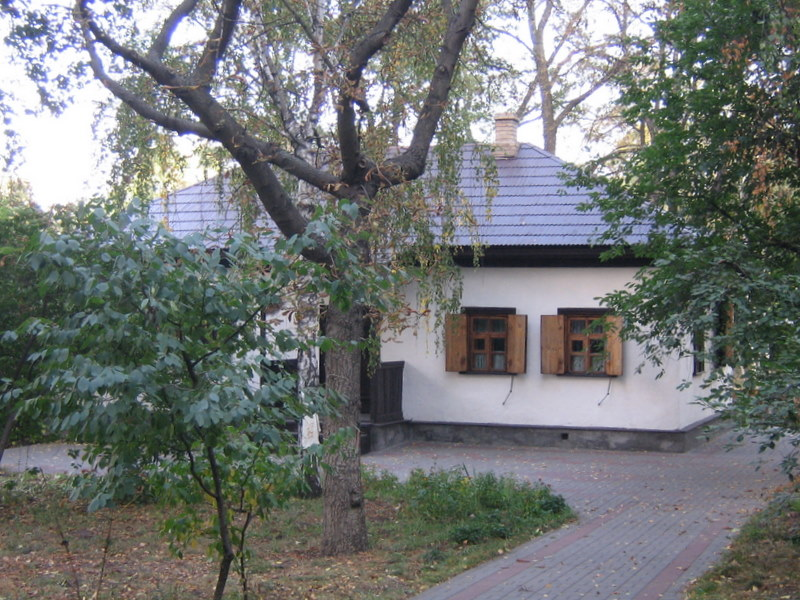
The house in Priorka district of Kyiv, where Shevchenko stayed during his visit in 1859

After receiving permission to travel to Ukraine, in June 1859 Shevchenko left St. Petersburg. After spending some time at the manor of Khrushchov family near Lebedyn, Shevchenko paid a visit to his old friend Mykhailo Maksymovych, who lived in the vicinity of Kaniv. From there he arrived to Horodyshche, visiting the sugar factory operated by industrialist Platon Semerenko, and then moved on to Kyrylivka, where he met his elder brother Mykyta and sister Iryna. Shevchenko then moved to Korsun, staying with Varfolomey, the brother of his sister-in-law. The two men surveyed land along the Dnieper, looking for a possible location for a house, where Taras planned to reside in the future.

However, in July Shevchenko was arrested following a report to the local police, which accused him of blasphemy, and transported to Kyiv via Cherkasy. After being released, Shevchenko stayed in Kyiv, renting a house at Priorka and visiting Soshenko, his old friend, before departing for St. Petersburg. On his way back he paid a visit to the Tarnovsky family at their residence at Kachanivka.

=== Failed marriage plans ===
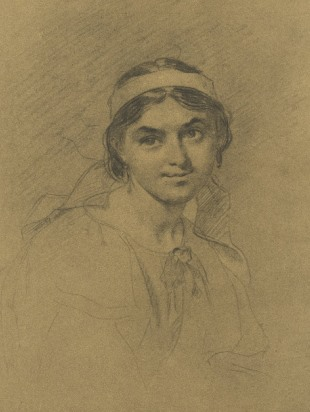
A drawing of Lykera Polusmakova made by Shevchenko in 1860

After his liberation from the long exile, Shevchenko shared to his acquaintances his deep unhappiness with his personal life. In the old age he dreamt of marrying and settling on land. Following his return to St. Petersburg, in November 1859 Shevchenko expressed his wish for marriage, asking his brother-in-law in Ukraine to help with his engagement to Kharytyna Dovhopolenko, a simple girl from a nearby village. However, Varfolomey discouraged Shevchenko from that idea, advising him to find a more culturally refined party.

In 1859 Shevchenko got acquainted with Lykera Polusmakova, who worked as a maidservant in the family of one of his Ukrainian friends from St. Petersburg, and soon fell in love with her. After recuperating from tuberculosis, in 1860 Lykera moved to the house of Hanna Barvinok, the wife of Panteleimon Kulish, but was eventually accused of "laziness" and expelled. Shevchenko arranged her accommodation at the house of his friend, a sister of Countess Tolstoy. There Lykera was taught by a teacher, who reportedly started courting her. This made Shevchenko so furious, that he was said to have cursed the girl and told her to go away, breaking the relationship. Lykera eventually moved to Tsarskoye Selo, where she married a barber and later took over the business due to her husband's drunkenness.

=== Last months and death ===
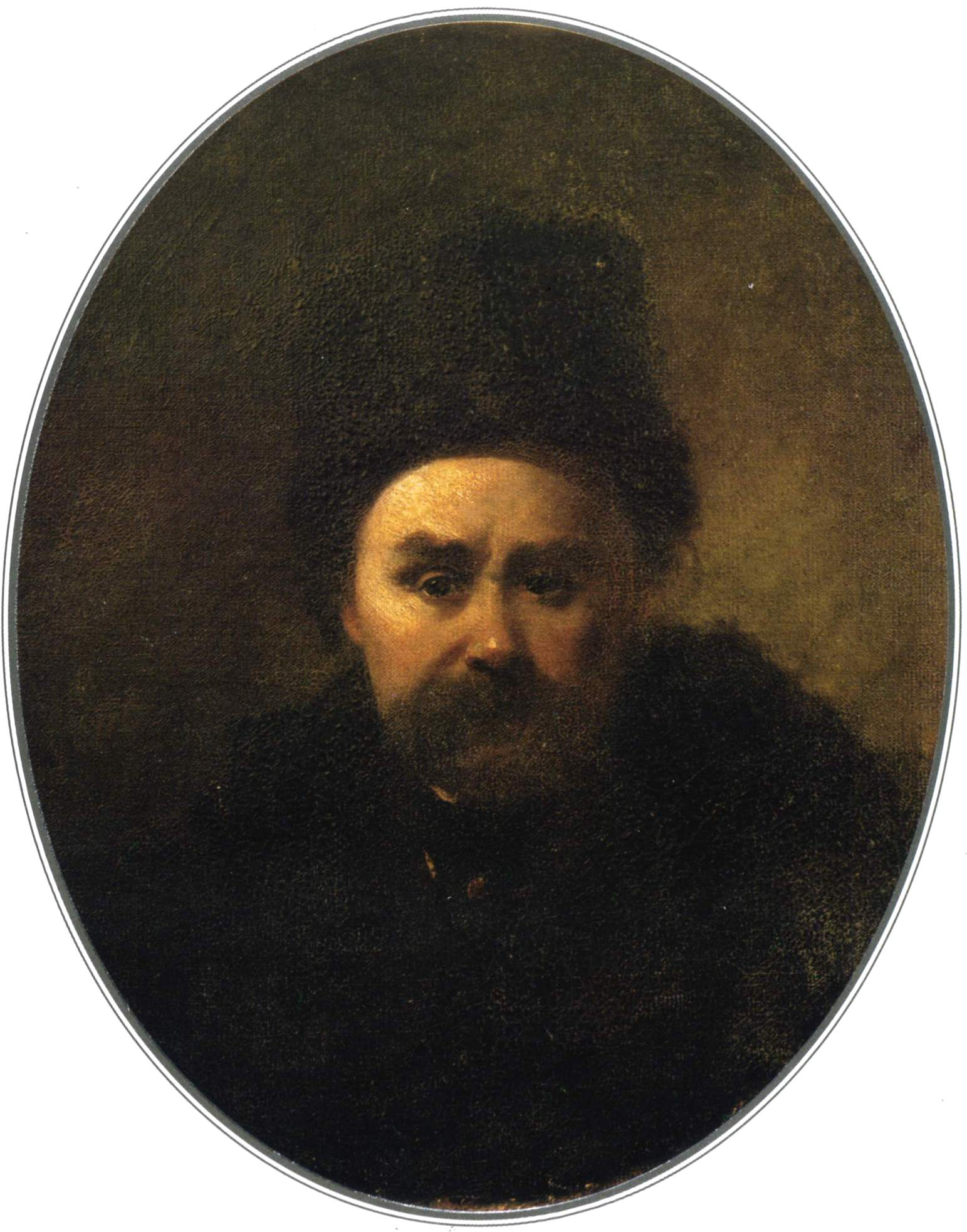
Shevchenko's final self-portrait from 1861

The break with Polusmakova delivered a heavy blow to Shevchenko. According to Kostomarov, in its aftermath the poet started consuming large amounts of rum and soon began to experience severe chest pains. Despite his sickness, he continued working, issuing his Bukvar Yuzhnorussky, a grammar book intended for use in Sunday schools around Ukraine.

By December 1860 the poet started to feel better and spent Christmas visiting his friends. However, soon thereafter his condition worsened, and he was diagnosed with dropsy. Doctors recommended Shevchenko to stop drinking, which he did, but it was already too late. On 14 February he composed his last poem, which remained unfinished. Suffering from severe pain and shortness of breath, Shevchenko nevertheless remained aware and eagerly waited for news on the release of the tsar's Emancipation manifesto, which was rumoured to take place soon.

On 25 February, his birthday, the poet was unable to lie down due to severe pain, and received guests sitting on his bed. During the following night he was visited by several doctors, who diagnosed pulmonary edema and applied analgesic medications to ease the suffering. At five o'clock in the morning Shevchenko called a servant and asked for a cup of milk tea, after drinking which he rose from his bed and entered the stairs leading to his workshop. Upon entering the workshop at about 5:30 AM on 26 February 1861, he gasped and fell down on the floor, dying at the age of 47.

=== Burial ===
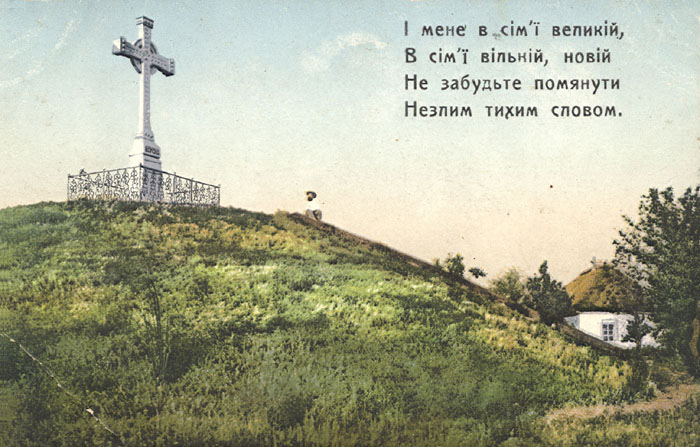
Grave of Taras Shevchenko, Taras Hill near Kaniv, historical postcard. The cross was dismantled by the Soviets in the 1920s.

Shevchenko was initially buried at the Smolensk Cemetery in Saint Petersburg. His funeral in Saint Petersburg was attended by such greats of Russian literature as Dostoevsky, Turgenev, Saltykov-Shchedrin and Leskov. However, fulfilling Shevchenko's wish, expressed in his poem Testament ("Zapovit"), to be buried in Ukraine, his friends arranged the transfer of his remains by train to Moscow and then by horse-drawn wagon to his homeland. After being brought across the Dnieper on a steamboat, on 22 (O.S. 8) May 1861 Shevchenko's remains were reburied on the Chernecha hora (Monk's Hill; today Taras Hill) in Kaniv. The burial site was initially rented by Shevchenko's cousin Varfolomiy, but later bought out and transferred to the city of Kaniv. A tall mound was erected over his grave, with a pig iron cross installed by philanthropist Vasyl Tarnovsky the Younger. An improvised museum was established nearby. Today the memorial complex forms a part of the Kaniv Museum-Preserve.

== Literary works ==
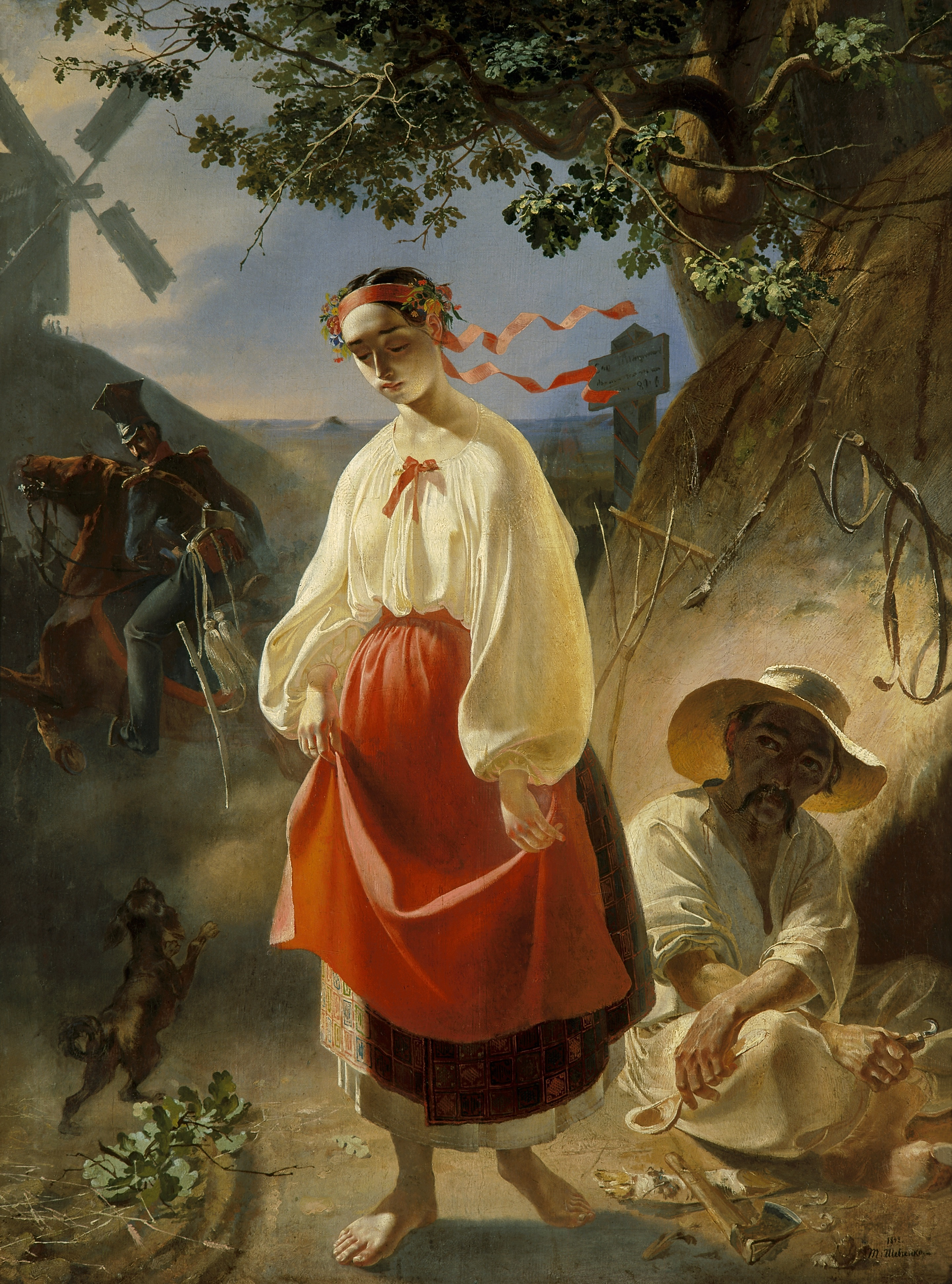
Kateryna (1842), a painting by Shevchenko illustrating his eponymous poem

=== Poetry ===
237 poems were written by Shevchenko but only 28 of these were published in the Russian Empire. Six others were published in the Austrian Empire over his lifetime.

==== Early writings ====
Shevchenko's early works continued the tradition of Ukrainian literature established during the period of its renaissance initiated by Ivan Kotliarevsky and Hryhorii Kvitka-Osnovianenko, who were the first authors to write in common Ukrainian speech and introduced topics of simple peasant life in their works. At the beginning of his literary career, Shevchenko remained under the influence of Russian and Polish Romantic literature, in particular Mickiewicz and Zhukovsky. However, already during that time the young author used numerous subjects and themes from Ukrainian folklore, best represented in ballads The Bewitched, The Poplar-tree and The Drowned.

Early works by Shevchenko are also deeply rooted in Ukrainian history: the anonymous History of Ruthenians was widely popular in Ukrainian lands during his time, and, according to Mykhailo Drahomanov, was only inferior to the Bible in the degree of its influence on the poet. In addition, many historical memories were learnt by Shevchenko from his immediate surroundings through oral tradition. The popular image of Zaporozhian Cossacks as defenders of Ukraine and its liberties is expressed in Shevchenko's poems Nalyvaiko, The Night of Taras, Hamalia, Ivan Pidkova and Haidamaky.

I know of no poet in the literature of the world who made himself so consistently, so hotly, so consciously the defender of the right of a woman to a full human life.

— Ivan Franko

In contrast to the idealized version of the past, in many of his early works Shevchenko expressed his profound sympathy for the sad conditions of serfdom experienced by his contemporaries in Ukraine. A special object of his compassion were women, especially young girls, who were the least protected from social injustice and arbitrariness of the landlords. This topic finds its expression in Shevchenko's poems Kateryna, Mariana the Nun, The Witch, The Waternymph, The Lily, The Princess, Petrus, Maryna, The Vagabond and The Servant.

==== Later period ====
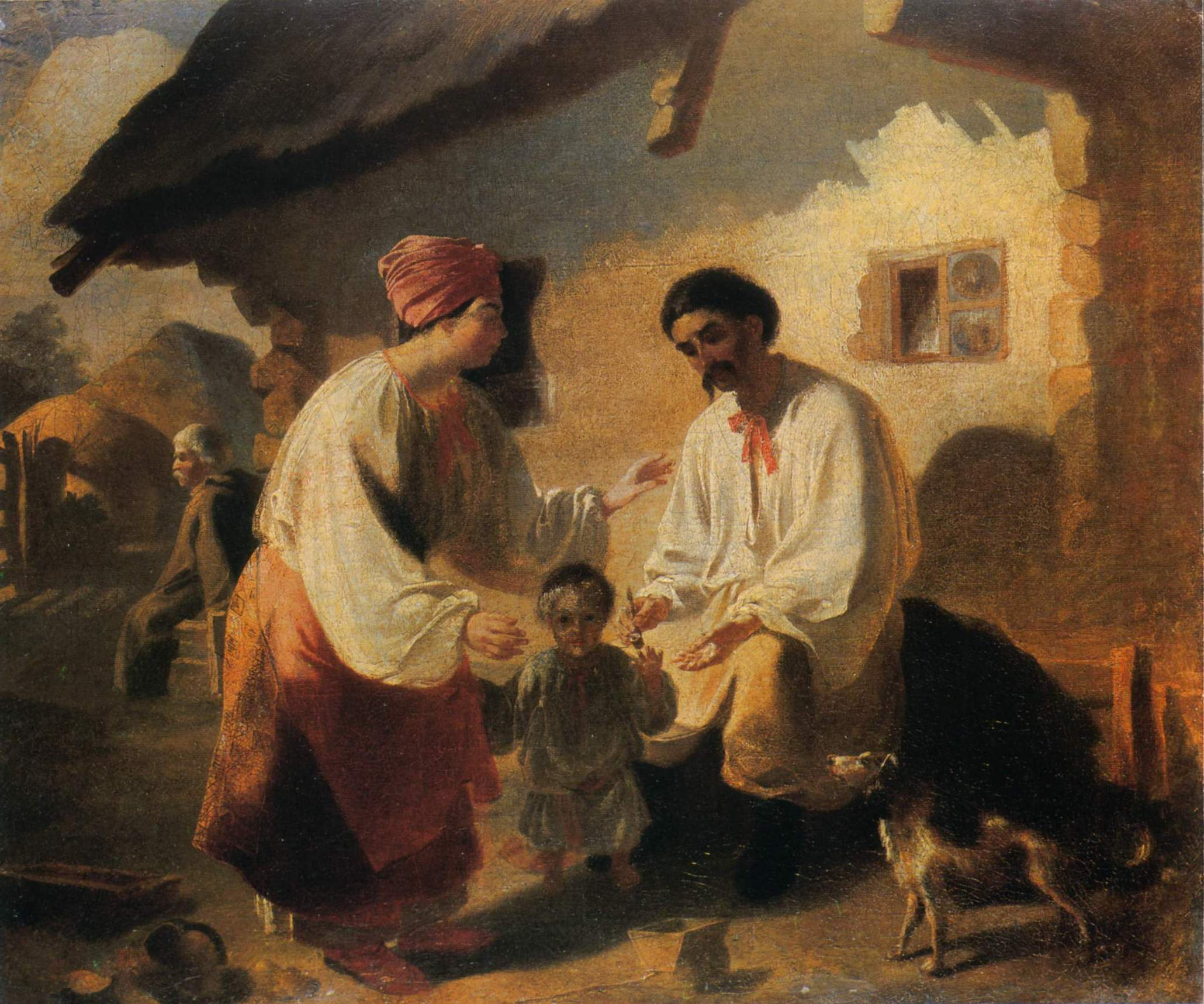
A peasant family depicted by Shevchenko during one of his visits to Ukraine in 1843

Shevchenko's 1845 visit to Ukraine was the first time he travelled to the part of the country which had long been ruled by the Hetmans, preserving its national aristocracy, many of whose members greeted him as their national poet. However, the social conditions in the area were no better than in the poet's native Polish-dominated lands, with Ukrainian landlords cooperating with the Russian government and enserfing their subjects in exchange for noble privileges, disregarding their country's history and national traditions and replacing them with simplistic materialism. This greatly differed from the idealized image of Ukraine existing in Shevchenko's imagination, and his compatriots' demoralization in face of humiliation by the dominant classes caused a great shock for the poet.

As a result of his experiences and under the influences of ideas of social progress shared by some of his noble friends, Shevchenko radically changed his social worldview and abandoned his romantic vision of Ukraine's Cossack past, adopting a more critical perspective on historical figures hailed by his contemporaries as heroes and recognizing their mistakes. From now on the poet stopped seeing Poland and the Jesuits as the main cause of Ukraine's misfortune, and recognized Russian Tsarism as the chief enemy of his people. His indignation at the tsarist regime was mainly concentrated on two figures: Peter I and Catherine II, who had destroyed the ancient liberties of Ukrainian people and introduced serfdom.

The most talented works written by the poet during this period are of political nature: The Dream, a work of satire, possibly inspired by Dante, depicting a fantastic picture of the Russian capital and accusing the monarchy of cruelty and deceit though the words of the poem's heroes; and The Caucasus, expressing the suffering of humans in their fight for the "divine fire" of liberty through the figure of Prometheus, personally blaming Tsar Nicholas I as a tyrant and predicting a future uprising against the oppression.

Another of Shevchenko's poems written in support of human liberty is The Heretic, depicting Jan Hus not only as a religious reformer, but also as a prophet of social equality. Religious topics take an important place in his work, demonstrated by the poems Neophytes and Maria. Shevchenko's appeal to human values led Alfred Jensen to describe him as a universal genius.

==== Translations ====
First translations of Shevchenko's poems were made into Russian language already during his lifetime. Since then his works have been translated into many languages. In 1911 a collection of Shevchenko's verse in English translation was issued by Ethel Lilian Voynich. Further English translations of his works appeared in 1922 and 1933 in Winnipeg, and in 1933-1936 in New York. Translations of Shevchenko's poems by Vera Rich were commissioned for the centenary of his death in 1961 and published in London. A complete English translation by Peter Fedynsky, The Complete Kobzar: The Poetry of Taras Shevchenko, was published by Glagoslav Publications in 2013. Shevchenko's 1845 Testament (Zapovit) has been translated into more than 150 languages and was set to music in the 1870s by Hordiy Hladky.

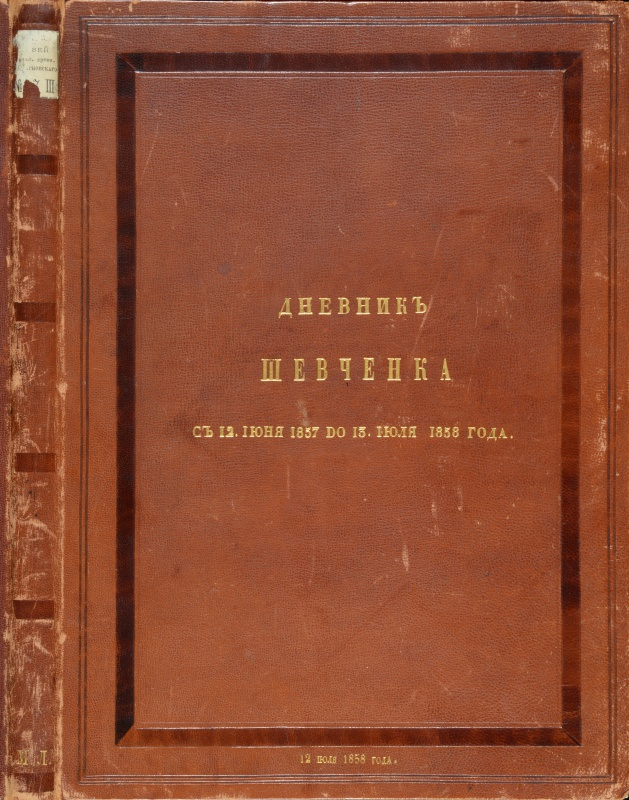
Shevchenko's diary

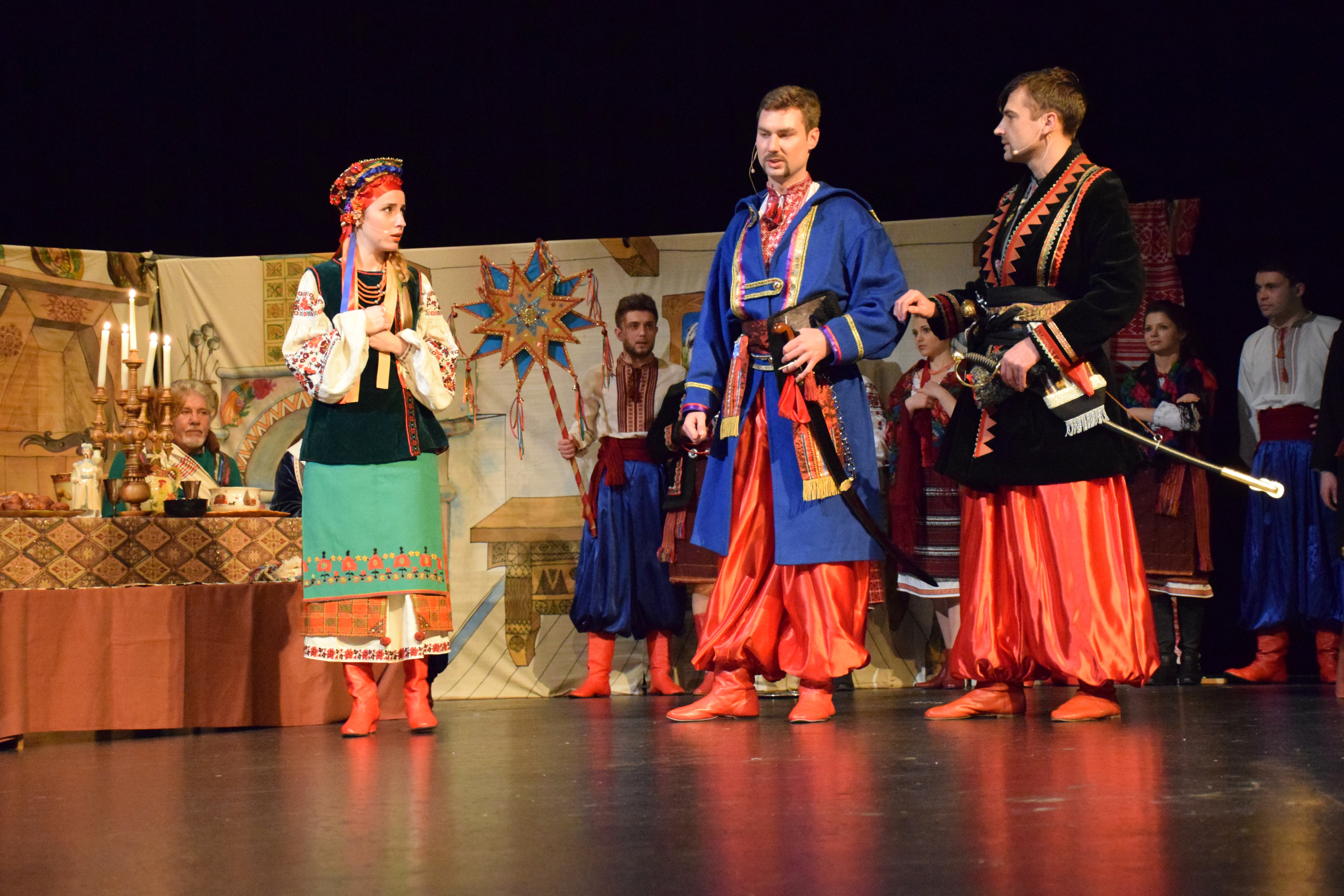
A modern-day production of Nazar Stodolia

=== Prose ===
==== Short stories ====
Along with Ukrainian-language poetry, during his life Shevchenko created around 20 novellas in the Russian language. Viewed with skepticism by his contemporaries, those works were never published during Shevchenko's lifetime, and some of them were lost. Shevchenko's prose stories were first printed during the 1880s, including a separate book issued by Kievskaya Starina magazine in 1888. Dedicated to a wide array of topics, they contain many autobiographical elements and are stylistically close to works by Gogol and Russian realists of the 1840s and 1850s. Despite being composed in Russian, Shevchenko's prose is generally inspired by Ukrainian life and is closely connected with the Ukrainian literary and folk tradition, being marked with deep lyricism.

==== Diary ====
Shevchenko wrote his diary (Russian: Журнал - "journal") between June 1857 and May 1858, in the first months after his liberation from exile. Composed in Russian language, the diary was presented by the poet to his friend Lazarevsky after his return to Saint Petersburg. Known for its ironic tone, it combines features of a literary work, a diary and a travel book.

=== Drama works ===
Nazar Stodolia is the only drama by Shevchenko which has been preserved in its full version. Produced already during the author's lifetime, it was first published in 1862 and enjoyed success around the Russian Empire, despite lack of positive evaluation by critics. Another one of Shevchenko's plays is Nikita Gayday, a tragedy in verse, which remained unfinished. Shevchenko's dramas are characterized with their concentration on social issues, and represent his evolution from romanticism to realism in literature.

== Political, philosophical and aesthetic views ==
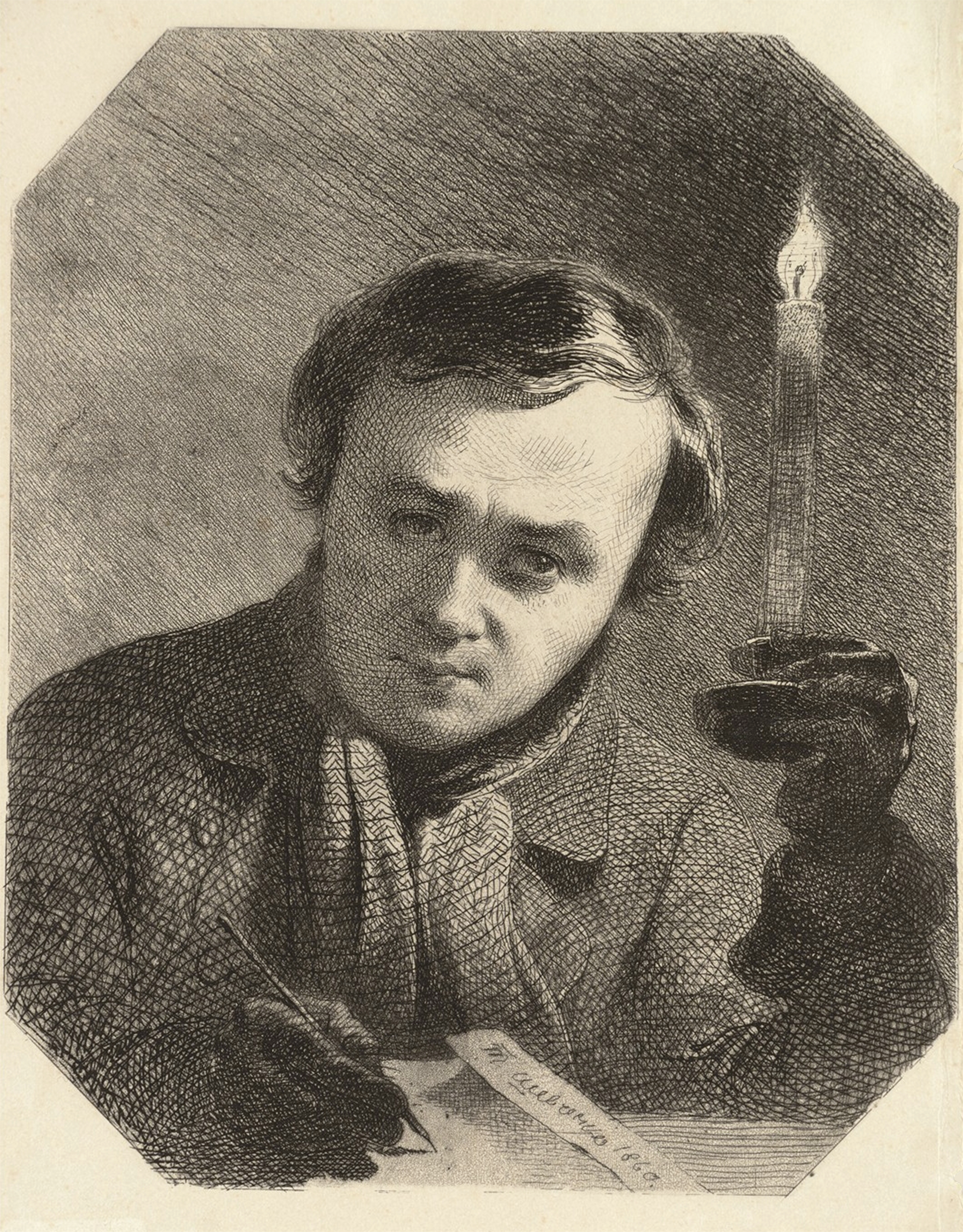
Reproduction of Shevchenko's self-portrait with a candle created in 1845

Shevchenko has frequently been characterized as a representative of the interests of the Ukrainian peasantry of the mid-19th century, the era of the crisis of the feudal-serf system in Imperial Russia. He did not consider the existing social system to be unshakable, and was convinced that serfdom would be destroyed everywhere due to the development of the steam engine, a technique that would "devour the landlord-inquisitors", and that the most important role in a radical change in social life would be played by the masses.

While he tirelessly exposed the oppression of the Russian landowners and the Tsar, Shevchenko also shared pan-Slavist views and maintained contacts with Russian intelligentsia. His attitude can be demonstrated by his views of 17th-century Ukrainian Cossack leader Bohdan Khmelnitsky, whom he praised as the "glorious of the glorious", but simultaneously criticized for paving the way for the liquidation of Ukrainian autonomy by Moscow. Shevchenko was also strongly influenced by ideas of the Polish revolutionary movement contained in the works of authors such as Adam Mickiewicz. Critical of the historical Polish attitude to Ukrainians in his early poems, later in his life Shevchenko started calling his compatriots for solidarity with Poles in their fight against the Tsarist regime. Shevchenko advocated for the unification of the Slavic peoples on a democratic basis. In his poem The Heretic, Shevchenko praised the struggle of Jan Hus (an early 15th-century Bohemian religious reformer) for the interests of ordinary people and the unity of the Slavs.

According to Shevchenko's aesthetic views, which the poet expressed in his Diary, the source of beauty is nature; any attempts to deviate from the eternal beauty of nature make the artist "a moral monster". Shevchenko strove for art that is both national (folkloric) and realistic, and for that he earned the praise of Chernyshevsky and the Russian itinerant painter Ivan Kramskoi, who drew the poet's famous portrait after his death. Although he argued that the strength of the spirit cannot manifest itself without matter, he did not call his philosophical position "materialism", understanding by this word the vulgar materialism of contemporary thinkers such as Büchner, Moleschott and Vogt, which he rejected.

During the Soviet era Shevchenko was represented by official sources as not only a national prophet, but also as an ideologist of an oncoming social revolution. Soviet publications considered him to be "the founder of the revolutionary democratic trend in the history of Ukrainian social thought" and a utopian socialist, and ascribed the formation of his political, aesthetic and philosophical worldview to the influence of the ideas of Russian revolutionary democrats such as Herzen, Belinsky, Dobrolyubov and Chernyshevsky; it was suggested that he was associated with a group of Petrashevists (a Russian literary discussion group of progressive-minded intellectuals in St. Petersburg in the 1840s, which also included a young Fyodor Dostoyevsky and radical utopian socialists), who, in their plans for a peasant uprising, hoped to use his revolutionary activities in Ukraine. In order to prove Shevchenko's sympathy to revolutionary ideas, Soviet editors and commentators went so far as to falsify the texts of his poems, removing mentions of God and religion and making changes to parts of the text which did not correspond to Communist doctrines.

Russian critic and editor of the Sovremennik literary, social and political magazine Nikolai Dobrolyubov described Shevchenko as "a poet of the people ... He came out of the people, lived with the people, and not only by thought, but by the circumstances of life, was closely and bloodily connected with the people." On the other hand, during his visits to Ukraine Shevchenko frequented the society of local nobles, and some of his closest friends were aristocrats, including members of Lyzohub, and Tarnovsky families, Princess Repnin, Count de Balmain, as well as general Yakiv Kukharenko. According to Dmytro Doroshenko, while Shevchenko foresaw a future social revolution, he hoped to influence the ruling classes through his word in order for them to peacefully renounce their privileges and prevent bloodshed. His appeals were directed to the whole Ukrainian people and can be seen as an attempt to bring about a reconciliation between various social classes.

== Artwork ==
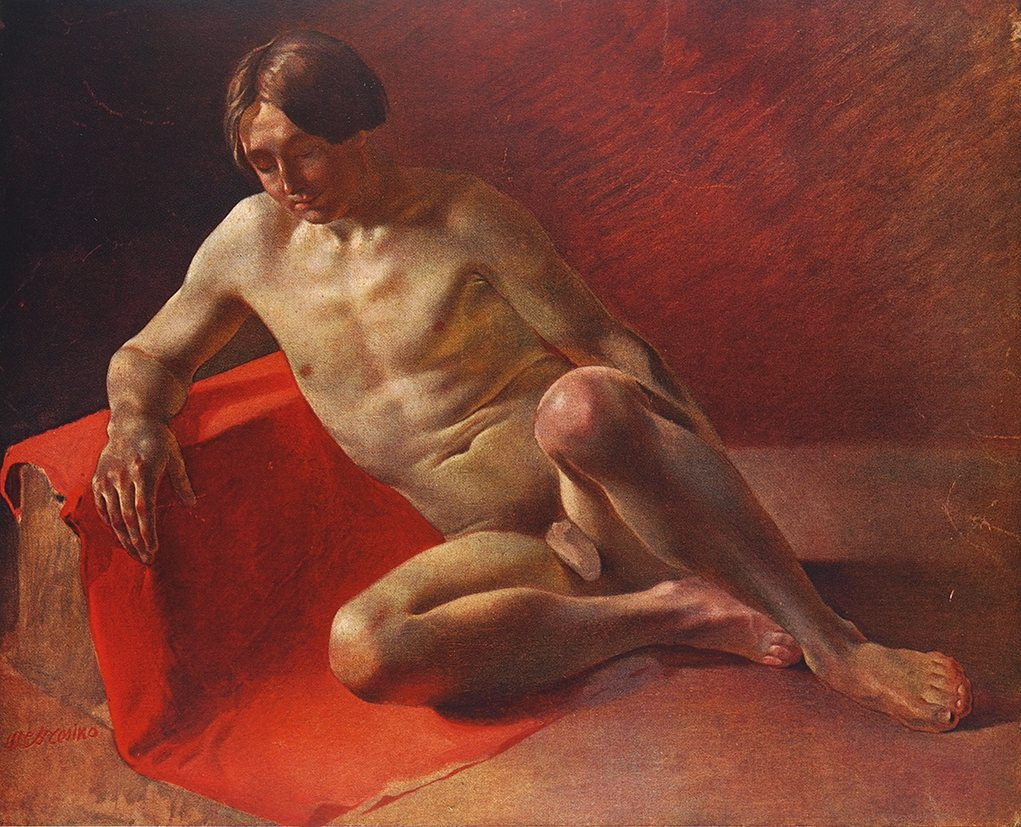
An academic study by Taras Shevchenko created between 1830 and 1847

Of Shevchenko's known paintings and drawings, generally related to Ukraine, Russia, and Kazakhstan, 835 works have survived as original works or as prints or copies made during his lifetime; 270 other works are lost. Shevchenko produced portraits, compositions on mythological, historical, and household themes, architectural drawings, and landscapes, using oils on canvas, watercolour, sepia, ink, and pencil, as well as etchings. Sketches and studies are known, which are of use in understanding Shevchenko's artistic style and methods. Few of his works are signed and even fewer are dated.

== Heritage and legacy ==
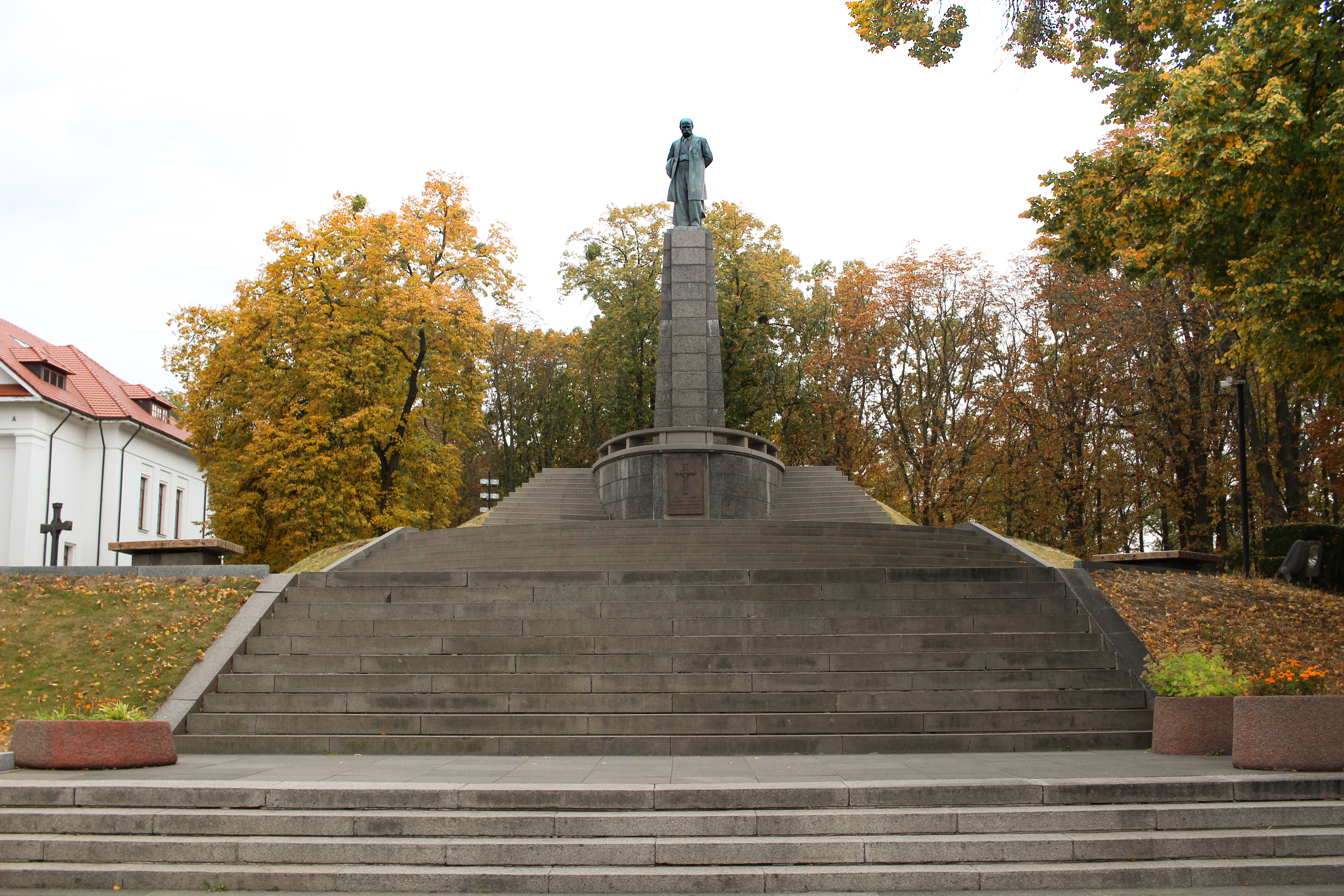
Modern view of Shevchenko's grave on Taras Hill in Kaniv

Shevchenko's works of poetry exercised a powerful influence on Ukrainian literature and the whole Ukrainian national movement. The list of Ukrainian authors inspired by Shevchenko includes Ivan Franko, Mykhailo Kotsiubynsky, Lesya Ukrainka and many others. His poetry collection Kobzar has been the most widely read book in Ukraine and is frequently compared to a national Gospel. The day of the poet's death, which coincides with his birthday, has been celebrated as a national holiday. Thousands of schools, libraries, reading rooms and theatres are named after him not only in Ukraine, but also in the Ukrainian diaspora around the world. Shevchenko Scientific Society, which served as the most important scientific institution in Ukraine before the establishment of the National Academy of Sciences, also bears the poet's name.

A great number of his pictures, drawings, and etchings preserved to this day testify to his unique artistic talent. He also experimented with photography and it is little known that Shevchenko may be considered to have pioneered the art of etching in the Russian Empire (in 1860 he was awarded the title of Academician in the Imperial Academy of Arts specifically for his achievements in etching.) He inspired some of the protesters during the Euromaidan. The context of his poem "Testament" (Zapovit) was given credit for "resonating" with Ukraine's ongoing struggle during the invasion from Russia in 2022.

=== Monuments and memorials ===
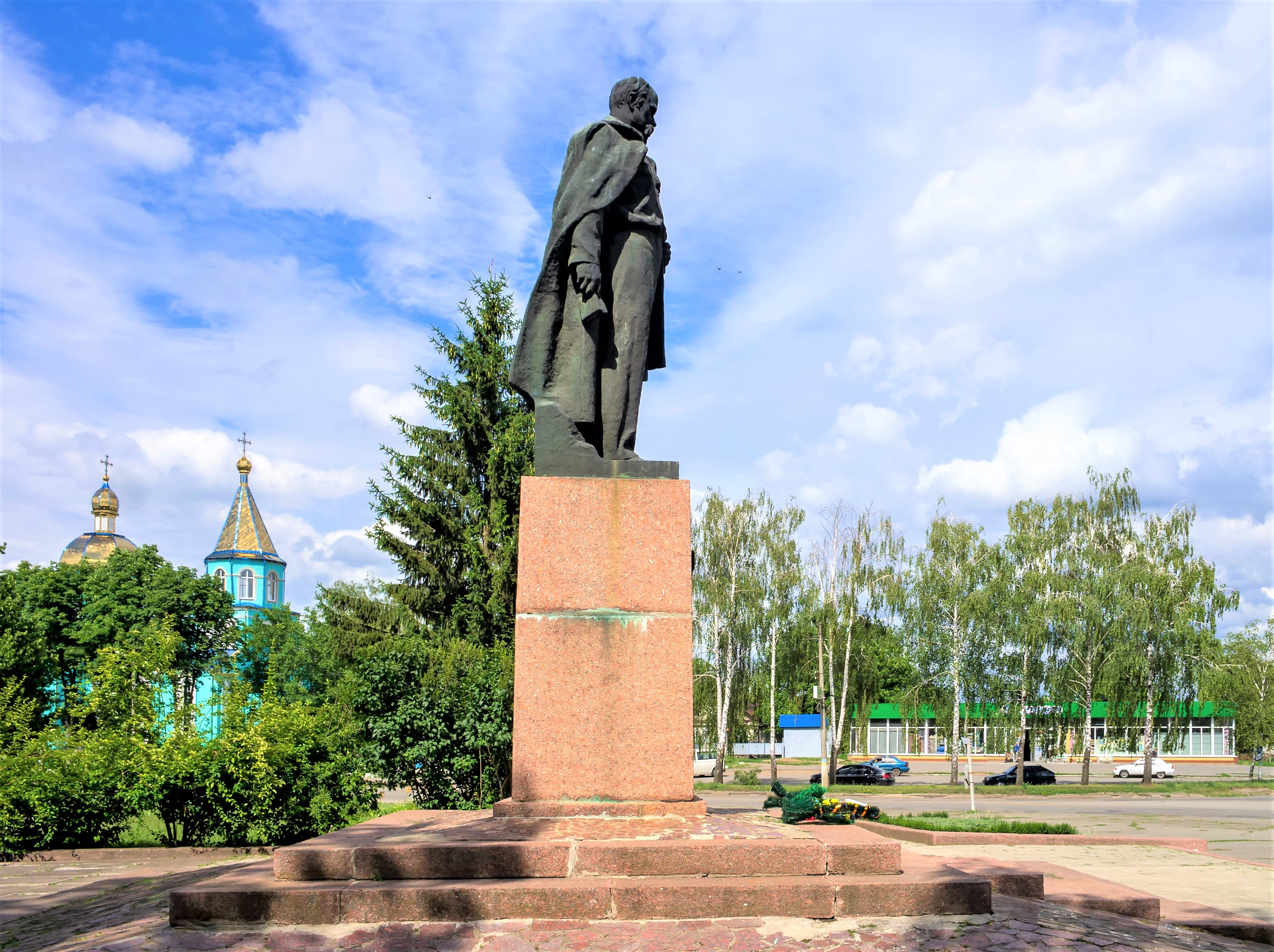
Monument to Shevchenko in Shpola, central Ukraine

Soon after the poet's death, Shevchenko's grave in Kaniv became an object of pilgrimage of the type usually reserved for sanctuaries and saints. The first statue of Shevchenko, unveiled in Romny in October 1918, was constructed in the waning days of the Hetmanate, but many such statues were built in the Soviet Union. Statues erected in Moscow in November 1918 and Petrograd in December 1918 were later demolished because they were made from inferior materials, and needed to be rebuilt. The monument erected in his name in Saint Petersburg was remade in 2000. There are monuments to Shevchenko throughout Ukraine, such as at his memorials in Kaniv, in the centre of Kyiv, Kharkiv, Lviv, and Luhansk. After Ukraine gained its independence from the Soviet Union, some statues of Vladimir Lenin in Ukraine were replaced by statues of Shevchenko.

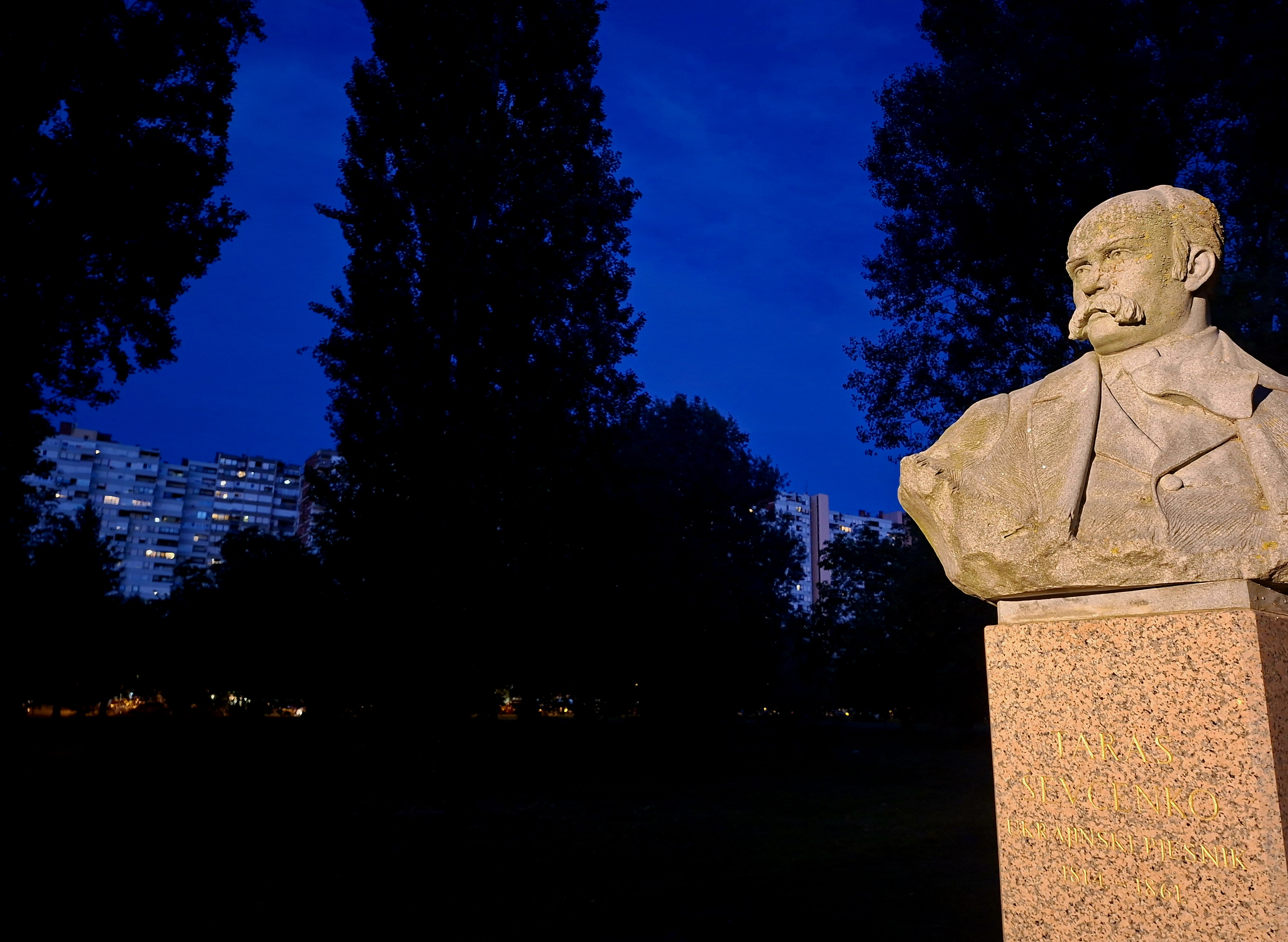
Monument to Shevchenko in Novi Zagreb, Croatia

Monuments to Shevchenko have been put up in other countries. These include the granite Taras Shevchenko Memorial in Washington, D.C., a monument in Rome, Italy (next to the Basilica of St. Sophia), a monument in Soyuzivka, New York, statues in the Brazilian cities of Curitiba and Prudentópolis, in the Dječiji Park, Podgorica, Montenegro, in the Croatian capital Zagreb, as well as in Novi Sad in Serbia. A bust of Shevchenko was unveiled at Shevchenko School in Vita, Manitoba, Canada in 1987 and another on 24 September 2010 in the Østre Anlæg Park in Copenhagen.

On 9 March 2026, the 112th anniversary of Shevchenko's birth, a monument dedicated to the poet was unveiled by the Embassy of Ukraine in Gaborone, the capital of Botswana. Located in front of the local university, the monument was created by local sculptor Francois Coertze using Botswana bronze. It is the first monument in Africa dedicated to Shevchenko.

=== Other commemorations ===
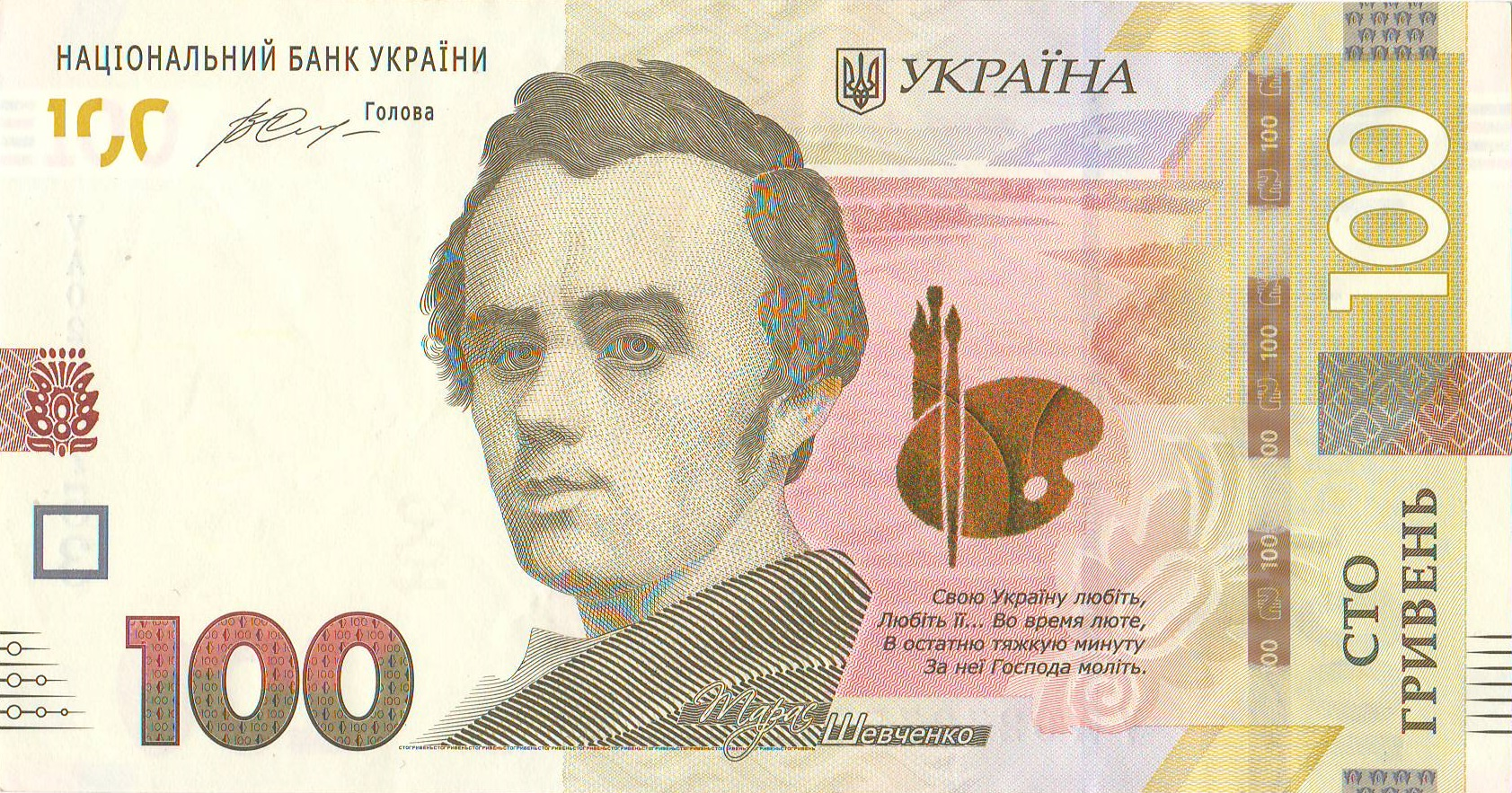
Shevchenko's portrait on the Ukrainian 100 hryvnia banknote

The town of Aktau in Kazakhstan was named after Shevchenko in the period of Soviet authority.

In 1957, the Ukrainian-American composer Antin Rudnytsky wrote the cantata Poslaniie, based on Shevchenko's poem of the same name.

In 1966, the Soviet State Shipping Company took delivery of the 20,000 ton Taras Shevchenko cruise liner.

From 1966 to 1968 artist Hanna Veres made a series of ornamental textiles that she dedicated to Shevchenko. They were used to illustrate the 1971 edition of Kobzar.

The Tarasa Shevchenka a station on Kyiv Metro is named after Shevchenko.

A street in Uzbekistan is named after Taras Shevchenko, as is a street in Oakville, Canada.

== See also ==
- List of Paintings and Drawings by Taras Shevchenko
- Legacy of Taras Shevchenko
- List of things named after Taras Shevchenko
- List of Ukrainian-language poets
- List of Ukrainian literature translated into English

== Sources ==
- Bilyk, Olena Ivanovna; Galganova, Oksana Oleksandrivna (2014). Тараса Шевченка І Україн: Рекомендаційний бібліографічний покажчик У двох частинах [Taras Shevchenko and Ukraine: Recommended bibliographic index In two parts] (PDF) (in Ukrainian). Kyiv: National Parliamentary Library of Ukraine.
- Buraček, Mykola (1939). Великий народний художник [Тарас Шевченко] [Great People's Artist [Taras Shevchenko]] (in Ukrainian). Soviet State Publishing House 'Art'.
- Kirilyuk, E. P. (1974). "Шевченко — видавець власних творів" [Shevchenko Is the publisher of his own works] (PDF). Polygraphy and Type (Поліграфія і вид) (in Ukrainian). 10 (10): 10–18. Archived from the original (PDF) on 14 March 2022.
- Kirilyuk, E. P.; Shablyuvs'ky, E. S.; Shubravs'ky, V. E. (1984) [1964]. "Study at the Academy of Arts: the appearance of Kobzar and Haydamaks (1838-1842)". Т.Г. Шевченко: біографія [T.G. Shevchenko: A Biography] (in Ukrainian). Kyiv: Наукова думка [Scientific Thought]. OCLC 749040916.
- Kravets, Ivan (1968). "Рушники Ганни Василащук Та Ганни Верес" [Towels of Hanna Vasylaschuk and Hannah Veres]. Folk Art and Ethnography (4). OUNB named after I. Franka: 13–17.
- Manning, Clarence Augustus (1960). Europe's Freedom Fighter: Taras Shevchenko, 1814-1861 - A Documentary Biography of Ukraine's Poet Laureate and National Hero. Washington, D.C.: United States. Congress House.
- Petrov, P. N. (1865). Сборник материалов для истории Имп. С.-Петербургской академии художеств за сто лет ее существования Ч. 2 1811-1843 [Collection of Materials for the History of Imp. St. Petersburg Academy of Arts for a hundred years of its existence] (in Russian). Vol. 2.
- Polevoy, Nikolai Alekseevich (1845). Русские полководцы [Russian Commanders]. Saint Petersburg.
- Shevchenko, Taras (1982). Kyrylyuk, E. P. (ed.). Документи та матеріали до біографії 1814-1861 [Documents and Materials for Biography 1814-1861] (2nd ed.). Kyiv: Kyiv State University.
- Shevchenko, Taras (2003). "Сон [Dream]". In Zhulynskyi, M. G (ed.). Зібрання творів у шести томах [Collection of works in six volumes] (in Ukrainian). Vol. 1. Kyiv: Naukova dumka. OCLC 263307527.
- Varshavska, Alina (2021). "«І МЕРТВИМ, І ЖИВИМ…»: ПРОРОЧІ ІДЕЇ ТАРАСА ШЕВЧЕНКА В КАНТАТІ «ПОСЛАНІЄ» АНТІНА РУДНИЦЬКОГО" [Both Dead and Alive: Prophetic Ideas of Taras Shevchenko in Antin Rudnytsky's 'Poslanie']. Ukrainian Musicology. 47: 150–160. doi:10.31318/0130-5298.2021.47.256746. ISSN 2520-2510. S2CID 249944017.
- Wanner, Catherine (1998). Burden of Dreams: History and Identity in Post-Soviet Ukraine. Penn State Press. ISBN 0271042613.
- Zaĭt︠s︡ev, Pavlo (1988). Taras Shevchenko: A Life. Toronto: Buffalo. ISBN 0802034500.
- Zhulynskyi, M.G., ed. (2015). "Товариство Заохочування Художників" [Society for the Encouragement of Artists]. Shevchenko Encyclopedia (in Ukrainian). Vol. 6. Kyiv: T.G. Shevchenko of the National Academy of Sciences of Ukraine. ISBN 978-966-02-6976-7.
- Zhur, Petro V. (2003). "The Eagle Takes Off". Труди І Дні Кобзаря [The Life and Works of the Kobzar] (in Russian). Kyiv: Library of the Shevchenko Committee. ISBN 5-89114-003-9.
