= Picturesque Ukraine =

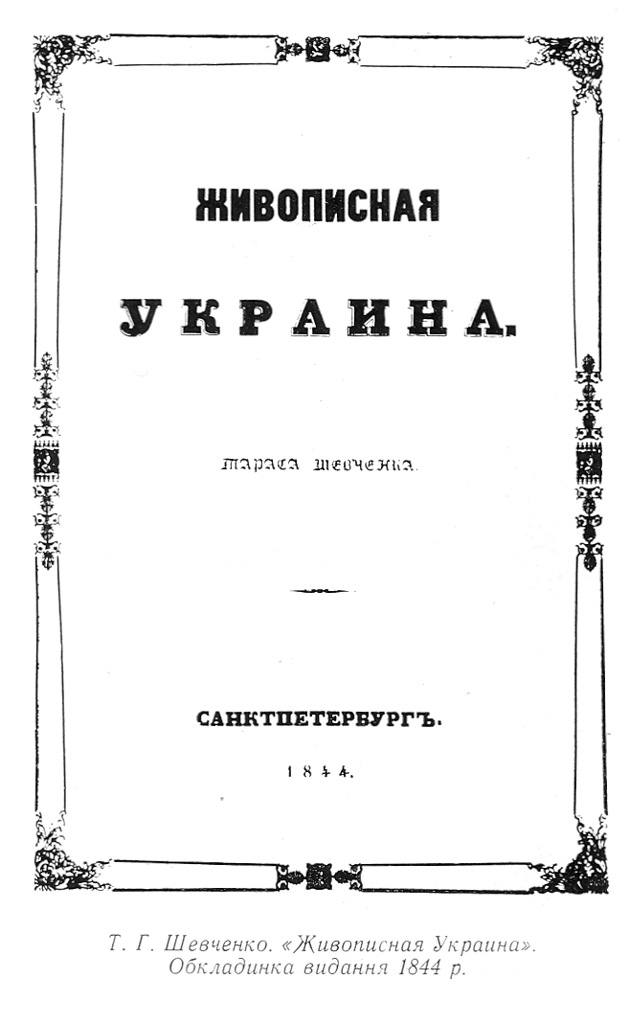
- Artist: Taras Shevchenko
- Year: 1844
- Medium: Etching
- Location: Taras Shevchenko National Museum

"Picturesque Ukraine" Is a series of drawings made by Taras Shevchenko in 1844. Made using the technique of etching, the series was originally meant to consist of twelve published prints each year. However, due to financial difficulties this was made impossible, and only one album of six prints was finished, which consisted of In Kyiv, Vydubychi Monastery, Ship Council, Fairy Tale, Old Age, and Gifts in Chyhyryn.

== Gallery ==
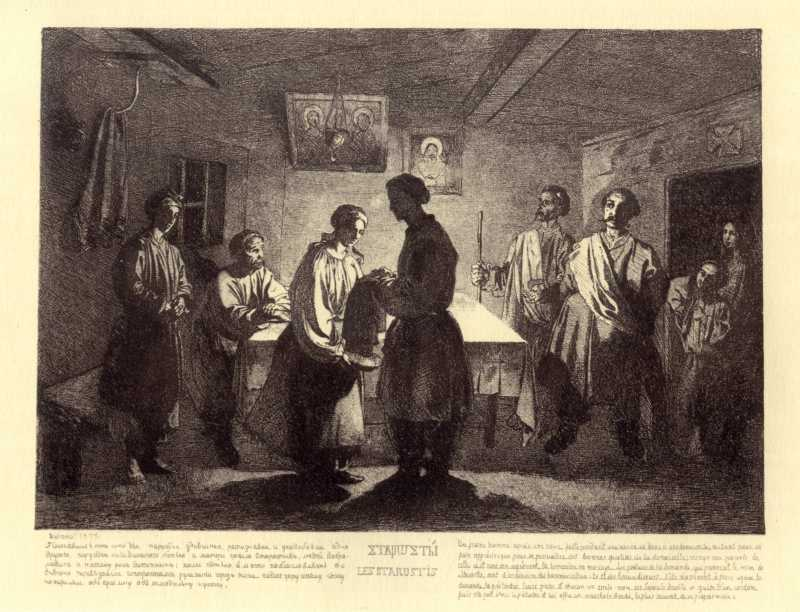
Old Age

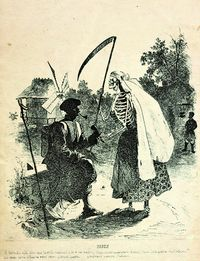
Fairy Tale

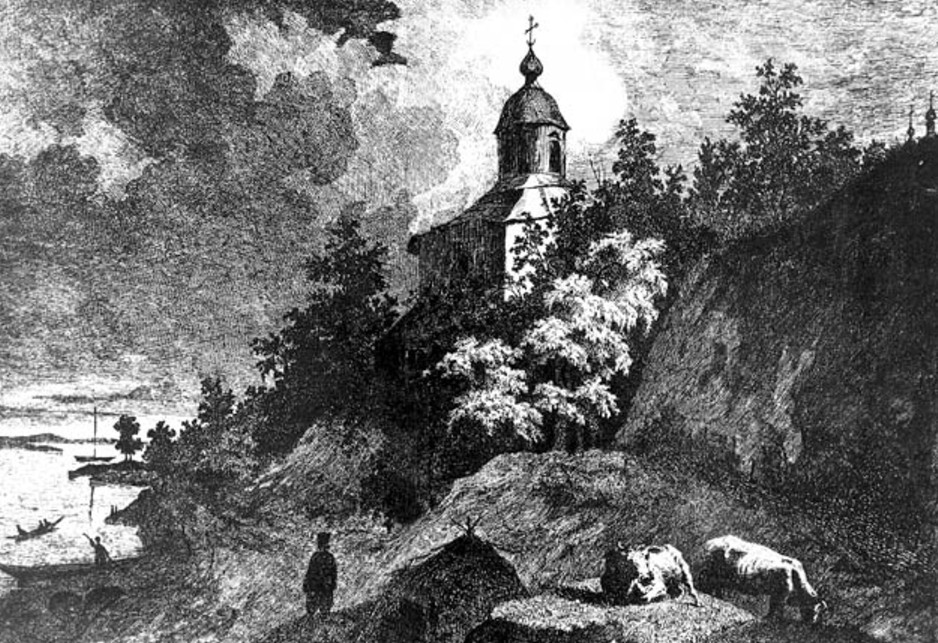
Vydubychi Monastery

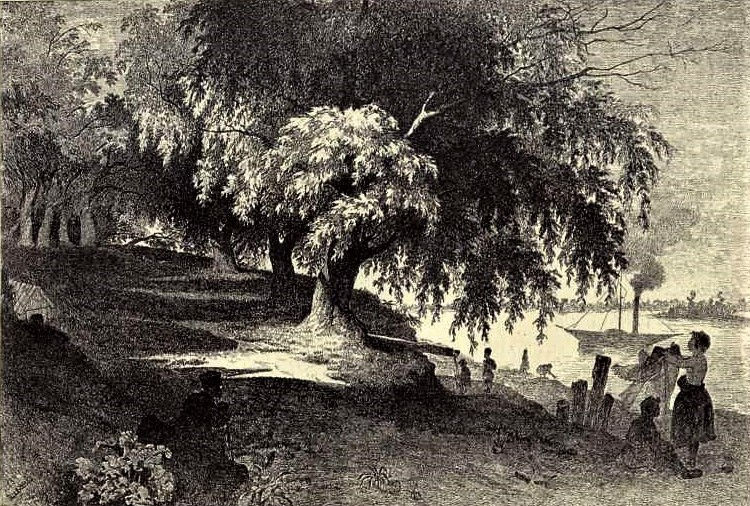
In Kyiv

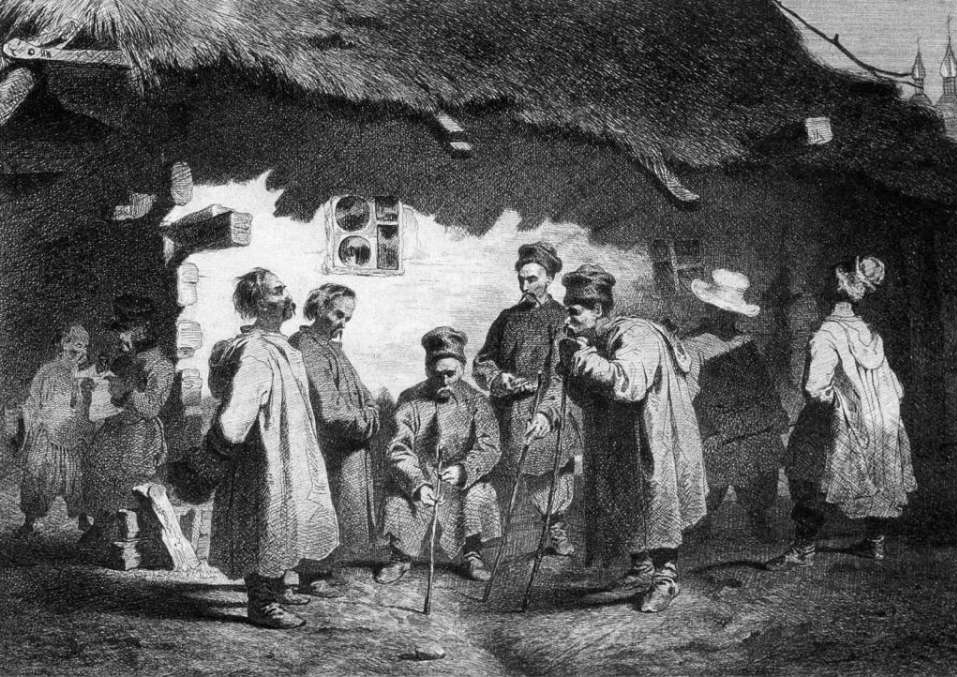
Court Council

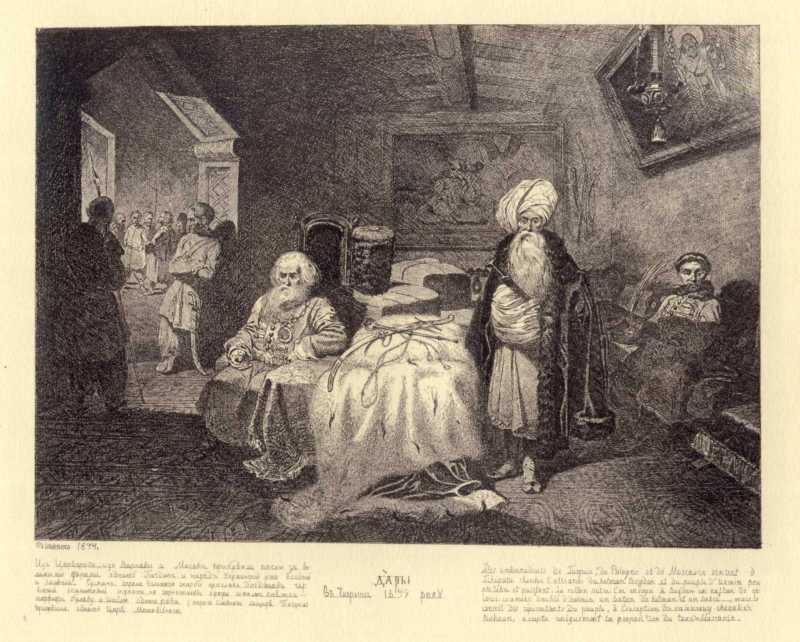
Gifts in Chyhyryn
