= The Wide Dniepr Roars and Moans =

"The Wide Dniepr Roars and Moans dedicated to Marko Kropyvnytskyi"

Song
- Language: Ukrainian
- Released: 1886
- Genre: Folk ballad
- Songwriter: Taras Shevchenko
- Composer: Various (original melody by Danylo Yakovych Kryzhanivskyi)

The Wide Dniepr Roars and Moans (Note: The Latin-based transliteration from Ukrainian is Rèvè ta stog'nè Dnipr shyrokyï and a more literal English transliteration is Roars and Groans the Wide Dnieper) (Ukrainian: «Реве та стогне Дніпр широкий», romanized: Reve ta stohne Dnipr shyrokyi) is a Ukrainian folk song. The song describes a stormy night on the Dnieper River, with an emphasis on the environment of howling winds, bending willows, and rising waves.

The song came from the ballad The Bewitched (Ukrainian: «Причинна», romanized: Prychynna), created by Taras Shevchenko in 1837. The original nationally recognized melody was set by Danylo Yakovych Kryzhanivskyi, but has been reinterpreted by other famous composers like Mykola Lysenko. Since then, the song became a national symbol during World War II and has been the call sign of the national radio broadcaster Radio Ukraine.

== History ==
=== Writing ===
"The wide Dniepr roars and moans"
A recording of "The wide Dniepr roars and moans", with the original words in Ukrainian, set to the melody by Mykola Lysenko and performed by Pavlo Hunka and Albert Kravolt

The lyrics of the song come from the first six stanzas of the romantic ballad "Prychynna" by Taras Shevchenko. The title comes from the first stanza of the ballad. The ballad was written in approximately 1837, when the author was living in St. Petersburg. The approximate date of his writing was proved from an interrogation by the Brotherhood of Saints Cyril and Methodius on 21 April 1847, where Shevchenko stated that he began to write his earliest "outrageous" works like "Prychynna" in 1837, with other members of the brotherhood calling his actions subversive and blaming him for being an isolated radical inspiring separatist ideas.

=== Composition ===
Composer Danylo Yakovych Kryzhanivskyi wrote the music for it, dedicating it to the playwright Marko Kropyvnytskyi, whom he greatly admired. The music was first published in 1886, but was changed over time to improve its melody.

== World War II ==
The origins of its popularity come from when Radio Ukraine was evacuating its offices after the start of the German invasion of the Soviet Union, when it went to Saratov. At the time, another editorial office for field radio was developed on the Don Front called "Dnipro", which had its own radio station and a railway car that was absorbed into Radio Ukraine in early 1943. Upon its absorption, Radio Ukraine used the railway car, moving it throughout Russia to provide radio transmissions to the Red Army, until the Battle of Stalingrad when in August 1943 it went to the front of Ukraine. During its time there, the editorial team chose the song as a call sign, and was then implemented across all Ukrainian radio stations when it was first broadcast on 2 May 1943.

== Modern-day Ukraine ==
Since the war, it has been the call sign for the opening program of Radio Ukraine and its international version. A different version was used on the Russian program of Radio Ukraine, which implemented a more modern version that was longer.

== Lyrics ==
Ukrainian lyrics

Реве та стогне Дніпр широкий
Сердитий вітер завива,
Додолу верби гне високі,
Горами хвилю підійма.

І блідий місяць на ту пору
Із хмари де-де виглядав, −
Неначе човен в синім морю,
То виринав, то потопав.

Ще треті півні не співали,
Ніхто ніде не гомонів,
Сичі в гаю перекликались,
Та ясень раз-у-раз скрипів.

Transliteration (Romanization of Ukrainian)

Reve ta stohne Dnipr shyrokyi,
Serdytyi viter zavyva,
Dodolu verby hne vysoki,
Horamy chvylyu pidiyma.

I blidyi misyac' na tu poru
Iz chmary de-de vyhlyadav,
Nenache choven v synim mori,
To vyrynav, to potopav.

Shche treti pivni ne spivaly,
Nichto nide ne homoniv,
Sychi v hayu pereklykalys',
Ta yasen raz u raz skrypiv.

English translation (by Constantine Henry Andrusyshen)

The mighty Dniper roars and groans,
The angry tempest, howling, bends,
Tall poplars to the very stones
And down the stream great billows sends.

The pale moon at that hour of night
Kept peering from a cloudy bank
And like a ship on waters bright
In misty waves it rose and sank.

No cock’s crow with the darkness strove
Or hailed a sky with dawning streaked:
The owls were hooting in the grove,
The ash-tree without ceasing creaked.
