= MS Taras Shevchenko =

MS Taras Shevchenko may refer to:

- MS Taras Shevchenko (1967), a seaworthy cruise ship that operated for the Soviet Union's Black Sea Shipping Company, scrapped in 2005
- T. G. Shevchenko (1991), a river cruise ship operating for Imperial Travel, formerly named Taras Shevchenko
