= Ukrainian Pontifical Minor Seminary =

Ukrainian Minor Seminary of St. John Bosco
- Lure, Haute-Saône (France), Castel Gandolfo (Italy)

Information
- Other names: Ukrainian Institute of St. John Bosco
- Religious affiliation: Ukrainian Greek Catholic Church
- Established: 1951
- Founder: Ivan Buchko
- Closed: 1999
- Key people: Stefan Czmil, Andrés Sapelak
- Years offered: 1951-1999
- Graduates: 2500

Ukrainian Pontifical Minor Seminary was the only Ukrainian-language minor seminary in Western Europe that prepared Ukrainian students for further theological pursuits. The seminary was founded in 1951 by Archbishop Ivan Buchko and opened in 1952 in Loury,(Loiret)(France)]]. It was closed in 1958 because of a law dispute. there were some 40 students at the closing (from England, France, Belgium and Germany. There was also a contingent from Trieste, whose parents were waiting to emigrate to Australia. The school was moved to Castel Gandolfo, Italy. The educational management and administration were entrusted to the Ukrainian Salesians.

The official name of the Seminary in Loury and in Castel Gandolfo was the "Ukrainian Institute of St. John Bosco", but more often used is the "Ukrainian Minor Seminary of St. John Bosco".

== History ==
Ivan Buchko obtained the consent of the General Curia of the Salesian Fathers for the Ukrainian Salesians to take care of the minor seminary. The General Curia agreed and concluded the first agreement, which was signed on November 24, 1951, by Ivan Buchko and Fr. Renato Gugliotti, Rector Major of the Salesians. The General Curia appointed two French Salesians to the newly established Seminary: Fr. Laurent D'Heygere, as rector (1951-1953), and his brother, Joseph Kares, as housekeeper, and two Ukrainian Salesians: Fr. Andrés Sapelak as a head teacher, and Fr. Hryhoriy Harasymovych as a clergyman and confessor.

In 1956 it was moved to Castel Gandolfo near Rome, and in 1959 the Vatican built a house for the seminary in Rome on the str. Boccea 480.

Pope John XXIII awarded the seminary the title of Pontifical (Papal) in 1963.

The average number of students was about 50–100, who came from different Western European countries, Yugoslavia and America. The largest number of students (112) studied in 1968–1969.

In 1996 the seminary left the premises on the street. Boccea in Rome and moved to a new building in the Salesian community on the street. Prenestino. Later it was ceased to exist in 1999. The Minor Seminary lasted for 48 years: from 1951 to 1999, it educated more than 2,500 Ukrainians from 15 countries in the diaspora and from Ukraine. More than 60 graduates became priests.

=== Abbots ===
- Laurent D'Heygere (1951—1953)
- Jules Lecompte (1953—1955)
- Ivo Maze (1955—1956)
- Andrés Sapelak (1956—1961)
- Stefan Czmil (1961—1967, 1976–1978)
- Vasil Sapelyak (1967—1976)
- Volodymyr Grynyshyn (1978—1983)
- Mikhail Prishlyak (1983—1989)
- Ewhen Nebesniak (1989—1999)

== Impact ==
The seminary considerably influenced literary and cultural activity of Ukrainian diaspora. The Rev. Ewhen Nebesniak and the Rev. Rafail Turkoniak are the most prominent representatives of that activity. Both of them are UK-born former students of the Minor Seminary in Rome.

The Rev. Ewhen Nebesniak wrote a detective story Nasha khata (Our House) in 1997. In 2012 he published a thriller Smertelne penalti (Deadly Penalty). Additionally, he wrote a number of books for children and he is the author of a film script on the theme of the Holodomor famine of 1932–33 in Soviet Ukraine.

The Rev. Rafail Turkoniak is famous for his translations of the Bible into modern Ukrainian from Ancient Greek (2000) and from Old Church Slavonic (the Ostrih Bible, 2006). In 2007, he received Ukraine's National Shevchenko Award.
