= Stefan Czmil =

Catholic missionary

Servant of God, The Most Reverend Stefan Czmil (Stepan Chmil) Bishop of clandestine UGCC
- Bishop
- Church: Ukrainian Greek Catholic Church
- Diocese: Sanok (clandestine)
- Appointed: never
- Installed: never
- Previous posts: Archimandrite, 8 December 1977

Orders
- Ordination: 14 October 1945 by Ivan Buchko
- Consecration: 2 April 1977 by Josyf Slipyj

Personal details
- Born: 20 October 1914 Sudova Vyshnia, Ukraine
- Died: 22 January 1978 (aged 63) Rome, Italy
- Buried: Santa Sofia a Via Boccea, Rome, Italy
- Education: Salesian Pontifical University
- Motto: unknown
- Coat of arms

Stefan Czmil (Ukrainian: Степан Чміль, Stepan Chmil; 20 October 1914 – 22 January 1978) was a Ukrainian Eastern Catholic known for his missionary work in Argentina as well as for work in his native Ukraine and Italy. According to Ukrainian Catholic Major Archbishop Sviatoslav Shevchuk, Pope Francis was mentored by Czmil and therefore knew the Eastern Rite well.

== Early life ==
Father Czmil was born in Sudova Vyshnya a small town in western Ukraine, some 30 kilometers from the present Polish border Rawa Ruska/Medyka. His parents, Stefan and Julia Szydlowska (Ukrainian: Степан та Юлія Шидловські, Stepan ta Yulia Shydlovski), were Ukrainian patriots and Christians, who instilled into their son a love of Ukraine and the Greek Catholic Church, as the Ukrainian Catholic Church then was officially known. After the first school years in his native town, in 1925 he was sent to the Ukrainian all-boys gymnasium in Peremyshl [now Przemyśl, Poland], whose catechist was Father Petro Holynskyj. Stefan Czmil joined the Salesian Congregation. It was his goal to educate poor youths in Ukraine in the same manner as Saint John Bosco did in his time in Italy.

== Career ==
In 1930 the Congregation for the Oriental Churches, Cardinal Cicognani, turned to Pope Pius XI asking him permission for Eastern rite candidates to the Salesians to retain their rite and Church traditions; it was granted. At the same time, Metropolitan Andrey Sheptytsky, Head of the Ukrainian Greek-Catholic Church (1901–1944), designated Josafat Kotsylovskyj, bishop of the Diocese of Peremyshl, to inform the Gymnasium's students of his intentions to send to Italy those willing to become Salesians. When the Salesian Superiors adhered to the projected plan of accepting candidates from Ukraine to the Salesian brotherhood, allowing them to retain their rite and Church traditions, Stefan Czmil and nine others expressed their intention to become Salesians. In 1932 they went to the town of Ivrea, in Northern Italy, where the Salesians had their school for candidates to the Salesian brotherhood.

After graduating from the school of Salesian aspirants Czmil was admitted to the Salesian Novitiate in Villa Moglia (Chieri) in 1935. He took his three-year temporary vows in 1936.

=== Education ===
He studied philosophy (1936–39) at the Salesian College of Philosophical Studies in Foglizzo (Turin), then interrupted his studies for a two-year educative stage amongst the novices of Villa Moglia, after which he was admitted to the Salesian House of Studies in Bolengo for his Theology (1941–45), during World War II. Ordained a priest in 1945 by the Apostolic Visitator for Ukrainian émigrés in Western Europe, Ivan Buchko, he followed up his studies with a baccalaureate in Pedagogy in 1947 at the Salesian Pontifical Athenaeum in Turin. Before that he was assigned as a tourist guide at the Catacombes of Saint Callistus in Rome under Salesian Administration, where he met scores of Ukrainian refugees unable to return to their homeland, who he helped to find new abode. He was also a teacher in the Salesian school of Valdocco (Turin) and an assistant in the Salesian Motherhouse of Valdocco to the Salesian Missionaries who came from overseas for a period of rest.

=== Missionary work ===
In 1948, with the assent of his superiors, Czmil was sent by the sacred Congregation for the Oriental Churches for a 12-year period of apostolic and missionary work with Ukrainian immigrants in Argentina (Haedo and Ramos Mejia, suburbs of Buenos Aires). There the young Jorge Mario Bergoglio, later to become Pope Francis, rose early to serve Divine Liturgy for him. The local political authorities were not willing or ready to accept a different religious rite to the Latin Catholicism of Argentina. Czmil's health started to deteriorate: liver problems.

=== Italy ===
In 1961 Czmil became the new Director of the Ukrainian Pontifical Minor Seminary, Via Boccea 480, Rome, 00166 which by then had 110 seminarians (from all over the Western world) and approximately 10 teachers. It was under his Directorate that the school received the title of "Pontifical", mainly due to the intervention of Patriarch Josyf Slipyj, head of the Greek-Catholic Church. His position as Director of the Seminary ended in 1967 after which he took on a more spiritual role as pastor to the students. However, he also continued as a teacher, educator and confessor to the seminarians. He acted as spiritual lecturer and confessor to the Ukrainian religious communities in Rome. He was lecturer of Italian language and literature at the Ukrainian Catholic University in Rome: He supervised and edited the second volume of the Ukrainian-Italian, Italian-Ukrainian Dictionary.

He was also member of the Commission for annulments of matrimony for Ukrainians in Italy, assigned to the cases of mixed marriages. In 1976 he was assigned once again to the position of director of the seminary.

He was endowed in the Basilica of Saint Sophia in Rome with the title of Archimandrite on 8 December 1977, with the traditional mitre, pectoral cross and crozier.

== Illness ==
Czmil's health deteriorated dramatically, and he had to be hospitalized. After a medical check-up it was decided he need an operation for gallstones. He seemed to be recovering, but on the morning of 22 January 1978 he fainted after celebrating the Divine Liturgy, and died.

The funeral service was held that afternoon. Bishop Stefan Czmil, the first Ukrainian Byzantine-rite Salesian lies buried in the crypt of the Basilica of Saint Sophia in Rome.

The following day it was revealed that he had been consecrated a bishop. The secret episcopal ordination took place in the Studite monastery in the town of Marino near Rome on April 2, 1977.
