= Ivan Puluj =

Ukrainian physicist and inventor (1845–1918)

- Іван Пулюй
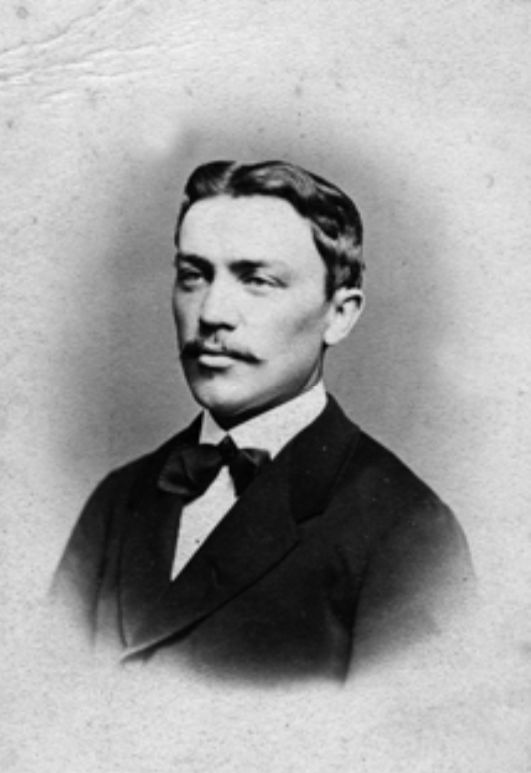
- Born: Ivan Pavlovych Puluj; 2 February 1845; Hrymailiv, Kingdom of Galicia and Lodomeria, Austrian Empire
- Died: 31 January 1918 (aged 72); Smíchov, Kingdom of Bohemia, Austria-Hungary
- Education: University of Vienna; University of Straßburg
- Known for: X-rays
- Spouse: Kateřina Stožicky (m. 1884)
- Children: 6
- Scientific career
- Fields: Physics
- Workplaces: University of Vienna; Imperial-Royal German Technical University in Prague
- Doctoral advisor: August Kundt

Ivan Pavlovych Puluj (Ukrainian: Іван Павлович Пулюй, pronounced [iˈwɑn pʊˈlʲuj]; German: Johann Puluj; 2 February 1845 – 31 January 1918) was a Ukrainian physicist and inventor known for his early research into X-rays. His contributions were largely neglected until the end of the 20th century.

== Biography ==
Puluj was born on 2 February 1845 in Hrymailiv, which was then part of the Kingdom of Galicia and Lodomeria in the Austrian Empire. He was the son of Pavlo Puluj and Xenia née Burshtynska (Ukrainian: син Павла́ Пулю́я i Ксенiї ур. Бурштинської). The family's original surname was Pulguy until 1861. His father, Pavlo, was a landowner who served as burgomaster of Hrymayliv from 1861 to 1865. Ivan grew up in Hrymayliv, and attended primary school in the village. He then attended the gymnasium at Ternopil, where he became a co-founder and active member of the Ukrainian student society Hromada.

He graduated with honors from Theological Faculty of the University of Vienna (1869), later also from the Department of Philosophy (1872). During his time there, he was the co-founder and later head of the Sich movement. After graduating, he worked as an assistant to the University of Vienna's experimental physics department. In 1876 Pului finished his doctorate on internal friction in gases at the University of Strasbourg under supervision of August Kundt. He studied in Strasbourg as a stipend recipient from the Austrian Ministry of Education. Puluj taught at the Imperial and Royal Naval Academy in Fiume (now Rijeka, Croatia) (1874–1876), the University of Vienna (1874–1884) and the Imperial-Royal German Technical University in Prague (1884–1916). He served as the rector of the Imperial-Royal German Technical University (German: Kaiserlich-Königlich Deutsche Technische Hochschule) in 1888–1889. Puluj also worked as a state adviser on electrical engineering for Bohemian and Moravian local governments.

In addition, he completed a translation of the Bible into the Ukrainian language.

== Personal life ==
4 October 1884, he married Kateřina née Stožicky (1863–1945) in Vienna. They had six children: Natalia (wife of the composer Vasyl Barvinsky), Olga, Maria Xenia Margareta (died in Vienna in 1974), Alexander Hans (1901–1984), Pavlo (died in 1986) and Georg (1906–1987).

== Scientific contribution ==
Cathode ray tube #12, Ivan Puluj design, ca 1896

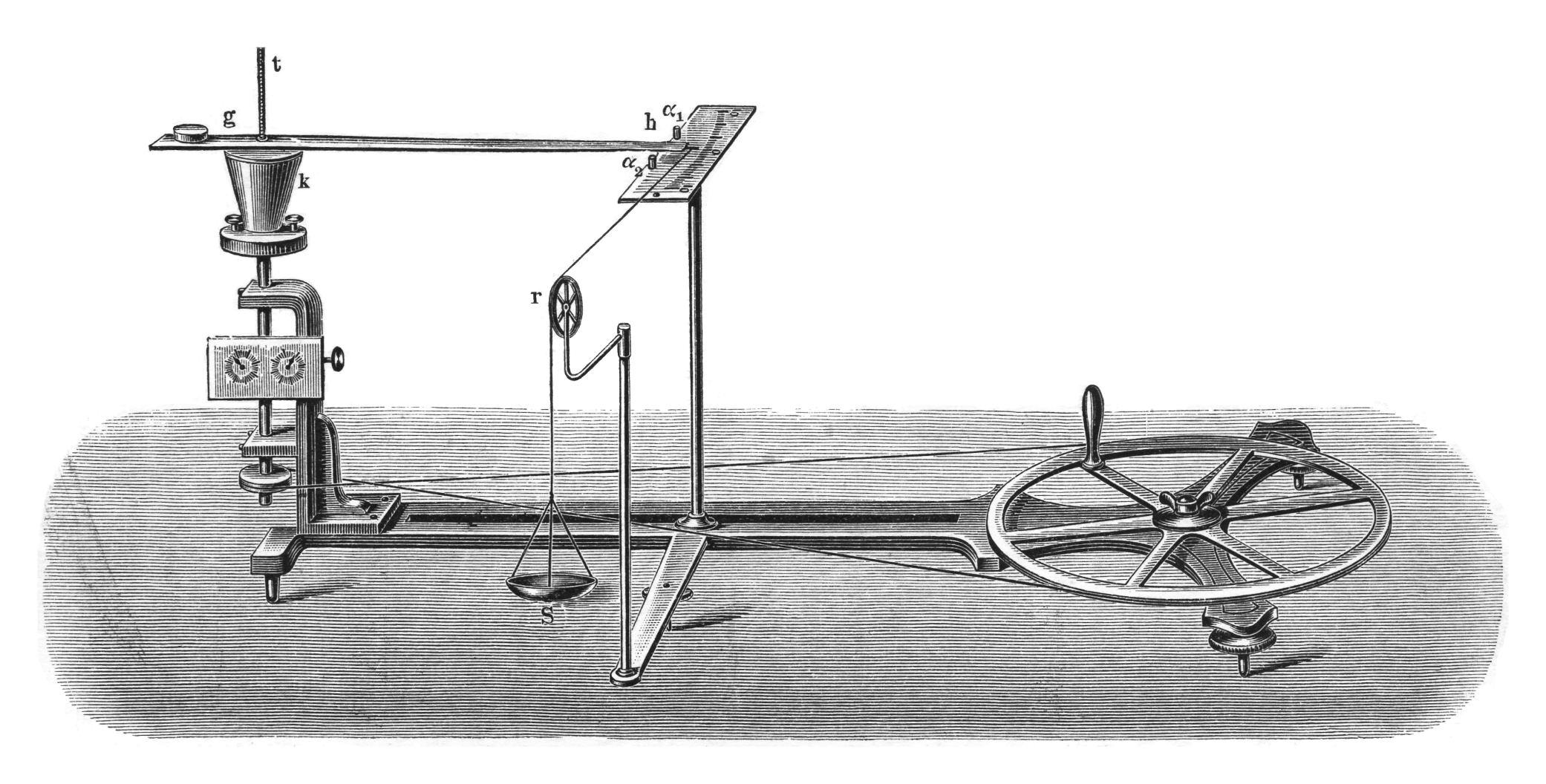
Puluj's apparatus for determining the mechanical equivalent of heat

Puluj did heavy research into cathode rays, publishing several papers about those rays between 1880 and 1882. In 1881 as a result of experiments into what he called cold light Prof. Puluj developed the Puluj lamp. Puluj experimented with his new device and published his results in a scientific paper, Luminous Electrical Matter and the Fourth State of Matter in the Notes of the Austrian Imperial Academy of Sciences (1880–1883), but expressed his ideas in an obscure manner using obsolete terminology. Puluj did gain some recognition when the work was translated and published as a book by the Royal Society in the UK.

Puluj's findings were essentially X-rays, which he reported 6 weeks after Röntgen reported his.

Puluj made many other discoveries as well. He is particularly noted for inventing a device for determining the mechanical equivalent of heat that was exhibited at the Exposition Universelle, Paris, 1878. Puluj also participated in opening of several power plants in Austria-Hungary.

=== Quotes about Puluj ===
- "World history has never been just to certain individuals or certain nations. Small nations and their achievements are often neglected, while the accomplishments of large nations are at times exaggerated."
  - Slavko Bokshan, a Serbian scientist who worked in the same department as Puluj and Röntgen

=== Honours ===
- Ukraine's Ternopil Ivan Pul'uj National Technical University is named after him.
- A stamp published on the occasion of Puluj's 150th Birth Anniversary in 1995.
- Streets in Kyiv, Lviv and other Ukrainian cities have the name of Ivan Puluj.
- On 14 May 2021, asteroid 226858 Ivanpuluj, discovered by astronomers at the Andrushivka Astronomical Observatory in 2004, was named by the Working Group for Small Bodies Nomenclature in his memory.

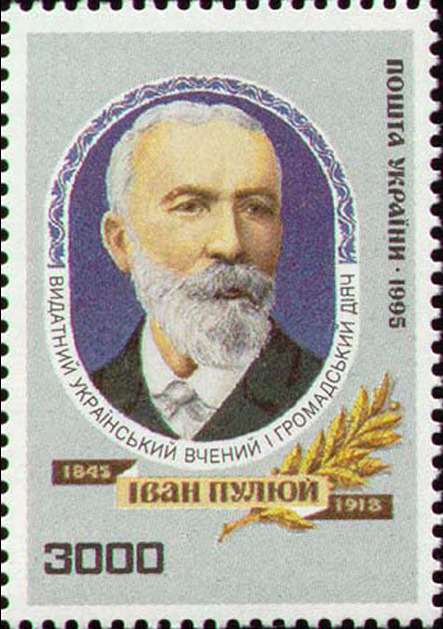
Ukrainian Postal stamp. 150 years born Ivan Puluj, 1995

=== Pulyui's publications and first images (1895) ===
- Strahlende Elektrodenmaterie //Wiener Berichte I. – 1880. – 81. – pp. 864–923; II. – 1881. – 83. – pp. 402–420; III. 1881. – 83. – pp. 693–708; IV. – 1882. – 85. – pp. 871–881.
- Strahlende Elektrodenmaterie und der sogenannte vierte Aggregatzustand' – Wien; Verlag Carl Gerold Sohn, 1883.
- Radiant Elektrode Matter and the so Called Fourth State. -London: Physical Memoirs, 1889. – Vol. l, Pt.2. – pp. 233–331.
- Über die Entstehung der Röntgenstrahlen und ihre photographische Wirkung// Wiener Berichte II Abt. 1896. – 105. – pp. 228–238.

=== Select works ===
- Puluj, H. J. (1875). On a lecture-room apparatus for the determination of the mechanical equivalent of heat. Taylor and Francis.
- Puluj, J., Pulyui, I., Пулюй, И. П., & Пулюй, І. П. (1876). Über die Abhängigkeit der Reibung der Gase von der Temperatur. (About the dependence of the friction of the gases on the temperature).
- Puluj, J. (1876). Ueber einen Schulapparat zur Bestimmung des mechanischen Wärmeaequivalentes. Annalen der Physik. 233(3): 437–446. (Over a school apparatus for determining the mechanical Wärmeaequivalentes).
- Puluj, J. (1876). Beitrag zur Bestimmung des mechanischen Wärmeaequivalentes. Annalen der Physik. 233(4): 649–656. (Contribution to the determination of the mechanical Wärmeaequivalentes).
- Puluj, J. (1877). Ueber die Abhängigkeit der Reibung der Gase von der Temperatur. Annalen der Physik. 237(6): 296–310.
- Puluj, J. (1877). On the diffusion of vapours through clay cells. Taylor and Francis.
- Puluj, J. (1878). On the friction of vapours. Taylor and Francis.
- Puluj, J. (1879). On the radiometer. Taylor and Francis.
- Crookes, W., & Puluj, J. (1880). Annalen der Physik. Phil. Trans. 1: 152–3879. (Annals of Physics).
- Puluj, J., & Glaser, G. (1880). The Fourth State of Matter. A Refutation. Science. 58–59.
- Puluj, J. (1880). Strahlende Elektrodenmaterie. ©Akademie d. Wissenschaften Wien, 864–923. http://www.zobodat.at/pdf/SBAWW_81_2_0864-0923.pdf
- Puluj, J. (1883). Strahlende Elektroden-Materie und der sogenannte vierte Aggregatzustand. (Radiant electrode material and the so-called fourth state).
- Puluj, J. (1887). Objective Darstellung der wahren Gestalt einer schwingenden Saite. Annalen der Physik: 267(8): 1033–1035. (Objective presentation of the true form of a vibrating string).
- Puluj, J. (1888). Apparatus for illustrating the fall of bodies in a vacuum. Taylor and Francis.
- Puluj, J. (1888). Fallapparat. Annalen der Physik. 269(3): 575–576.
- Puluj, J. (1890). On a telethermometer. Taylor and Francis.
- Puluj, H. (1895). On Kathode Rays. Proceedings of the Physical Society of London. 14(1): 178.

== Support of Ukrainian culture ==
Puluj is also known for his contribution in promoting Ukrainian culture. He actively supported opening of a Ukrainian university in Lviv and published articles to support Ukrainian language. Together with P. Kulish and I. Nechuy-Levytsky he translated Gospels and Psalter into Ukrainian. Being a professor, Puluj organized scholarships for Ukrainian students in Austria-Hungary.

The World Association of Roentgenologists was created in 2018 in Lviv city in honor of Ivan Puluj (citation needed).

== Literature ==
- R. Gajda, R. Plazko: Johann Puluj: Rätsel des universalen Talents. EuroWelt-Verlag, Lwiw 2001, ISBN 966-7343-04-9
- S. Nahorniak, M. Medyukh: Physical-technical ideas of Ivan Pul'uj. Dschura, Ternopil 1999, ISBN 966-7497-34-8
- Юрiй Головач, Роман Пляцко, Галина Сварник (2020). Петер Пулюй i архiв Iвана Пулюя (PDF) (in Ukrainian). Львів: Нацiональна академiя наук України.
