= Bible translations into Ukrainian =

Ukrainian translations of The Bible

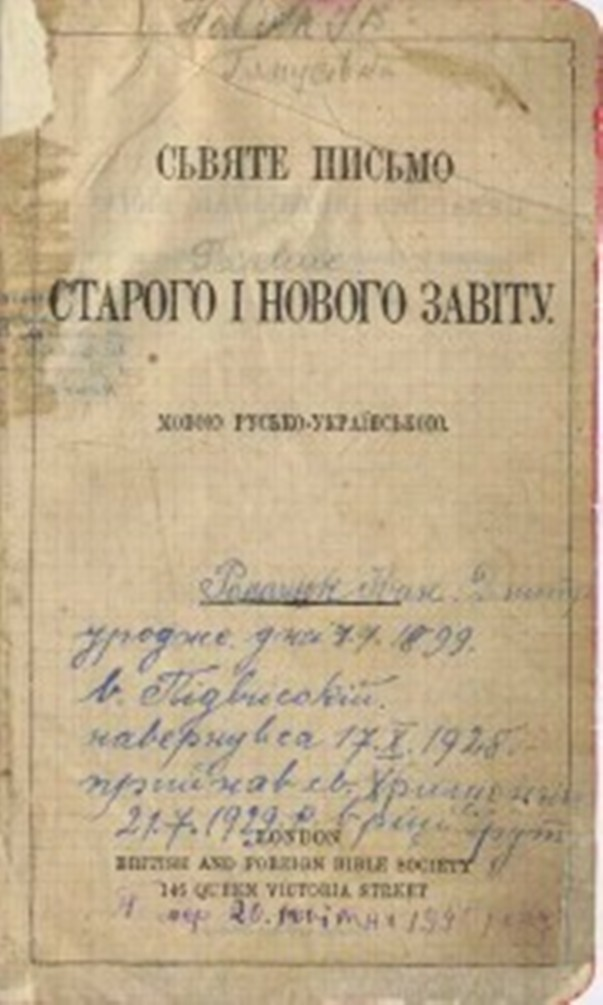
Title page of the translation of the Bible by Panteleimon Kulish, published in 1903

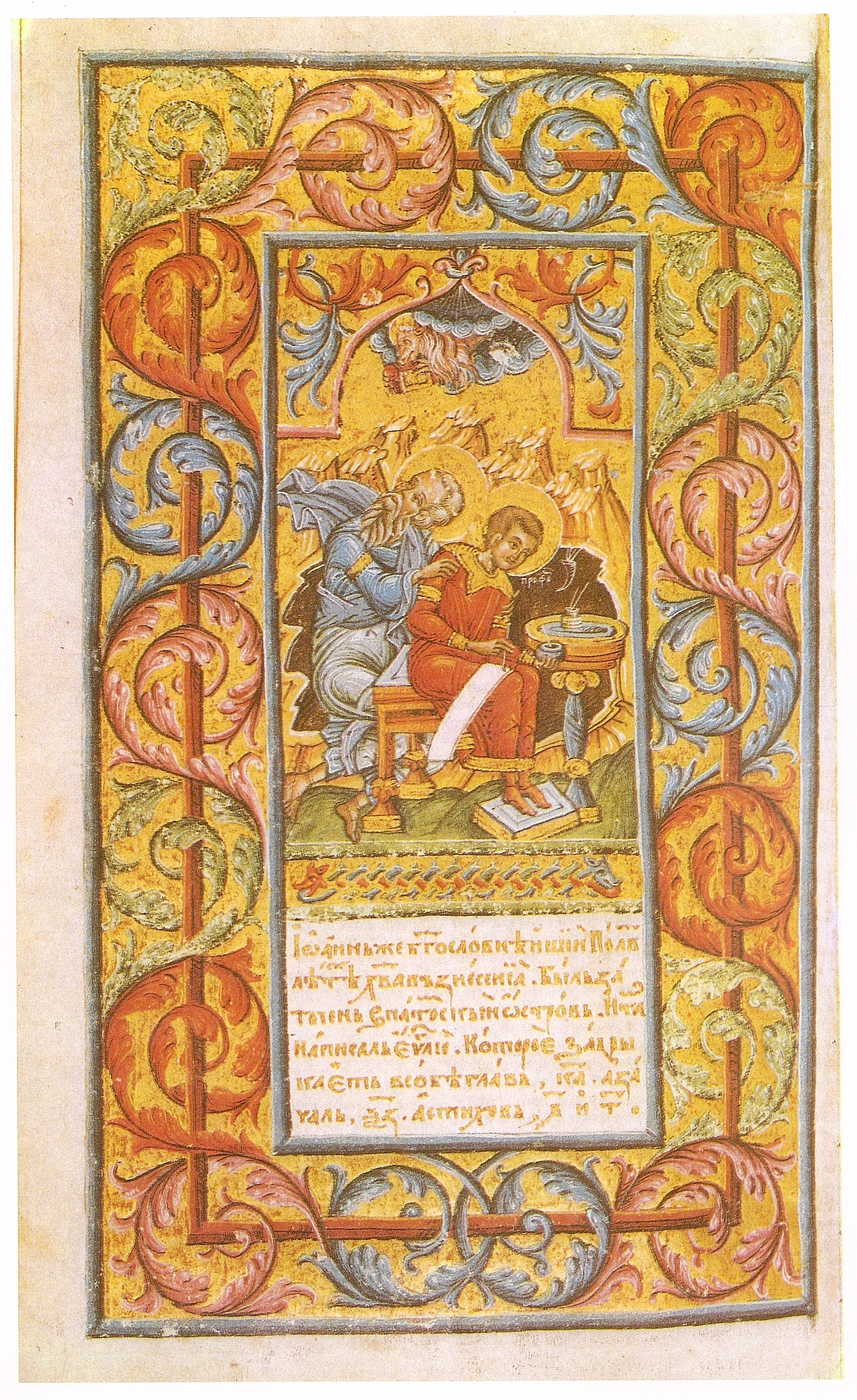
An illustration from the Peresopnytsia Gospels

The known history of Bible translation into Ukrainian began in the 16th century with Peresopnytsia Gospels, which included only four Gospels of the New Testament.

However, the first mention of the already available translations of the Gospels and the Psalms into Old East Slavic language dates back to the stay of Saints Cyril and Methodius in Chersonesos in 860 or 861. Even then, these translations were at their disposal, that is, before the Moravian mission of Cyril and Methodius. Thus, translations began to spread in the territories of modern Ukraine, which were later reflected in translations into Ukrainian.

Later in 17th-19th centuries, when the Ukrainian territory was a part of the Russian Empire, several other translations were made secretly because of the Russian Government restrictions on Ukrainian language.

At present there are several translations of Holy Scripture into Ukrainian:

- Pentateuch translated by Panteleimon Kulish, published in Lemberg (Lviv)
- Kulish's Bible was published in Vienna in 1903 by British and Foreign Bible Society;
- Pylyp Morachevskyi's translation of the New Testament;
- Ivan Khomenko's translation, so-called "Rome Bible", translated by Greek-Catholic translator in Rome, Italy;
- Metropolitan Ilarion (Ivan Ohienko)'s translation, translated by Orthodox priest;
- Patriarch Filaret (Mykhailo Denysenko)'s translation;
- Rafail Turkoniak's translation (1997–2007) by order of all-confessional Ukrainian Bible Society.
- New World Translation of the Holy Scriptures, 2005, 2014 edition, produced and published by Jehovah's Witnesses. In 2018, the Study edition of the Bible was released, it includes pictures, study notes, cross-references, and other features for in-depth Bible study.

== See also ==
- Bible translations into Slavic languages
