= Kulish's Bible =

Ukrainian Bible translation

Holy Scripture of the Old and New Testaments
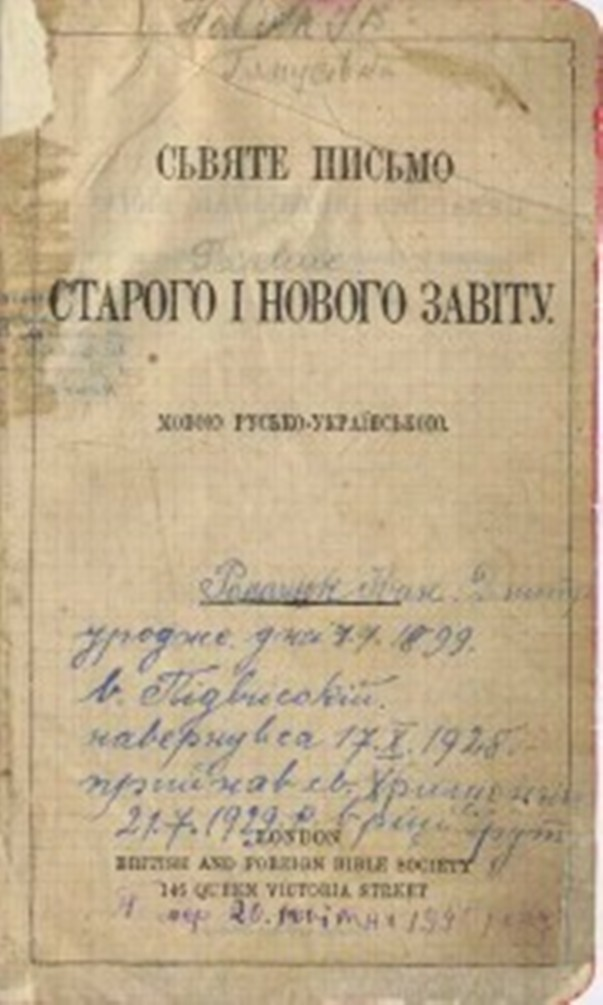
- Language: Ukrainian
- Published: 1903; 1904, 1906, 1908, 1909, 1912, 1920 (Vienna); 1910 (Berlin); 1944 (New York); 1947 (London); 2000 (Kyiv)
- Publisher: Publication of the British and Foreign Bible Society
- Publication place: Austria-Hungary
- Pages: 829

The translation of the Bible by Panteleimon Kulish, Ivan Puluj and Ivan Nechuy-Levytsky, known as the Holy Scriptures of the Old and New Testament is the first complete translation of the Old Testament and the New Testament into the Ukrainian language, carried out mainly by Panteleimon Kulish with editorial and translation revisions by Ivan Puluj and the addition of translations by Ivan Nechuy-Levytskyi, which was published in 1903 in Vienna.

From the beginning of the work to the publication, Ivan Puluj worked for about 35 years. The book was published after the death of Panteleimon Kulish.

The complete translation of the Book of Books, on the one hand, testified to the sufficiently high level of development of the literary language at that time, and on the other hand, contributed to its further development, because the Ukrainian literary language at the beginning of the 20th century functioned in two main regional variants: eastern and western. This state of the language is combined with the confessional style of translation.

== Description ==
The translation of the Bible by Kulish, Puluj, and Nechuy-Levytskyi has 66 books: 39 - the Old Testament and 27 - the New Testament, that is, it is a Protestant version of the translation. This is due to the fact that financial support for the translation, printing, and partial distribution was carried out by the British Bible Society, which is sometimes also called the London Bible Society, formed in London in 1804.

== History of the translation ==
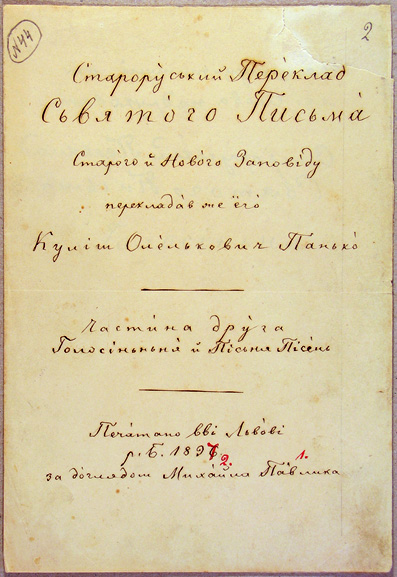
The first handwritten page of Panteleimon Kulish's translation of the "Transcribed Bible." Lviv, 1897

During 1868–1869, Panteleimon Kulish published in the Lviv magazine Pravda translations of several Psalms of David under the pseudonym Pavlo Ratai, as well as two songs of Moses ("Songs over the Red Sea" and "Songs of the Dying") and, finally, the entire Torah. In an explanatory note, Kulish declared his translation "just a proofreading", urging readers to make changes and clarifications. In 1871, in cooperation with Pulij, Kulish translated the New Testament from Greek, first publishing separate Gospels: the Gospel according to Matthew (also: according to Mark, according to Luke, according to John) in Vienna in 1871 and in Lviv in 1880. In 1887, the Gospel was published in a separate edition in Vienna by the Bible Society.

From 1874 to 1877, Mykhailo Drahomanov was engaged in publishing the New Testament on behalf of Panteleimon Kulish.

The translators compared their translation with Church Slavonic, Russian, Polish, Serbian, German, Latin, English, and French translations of the Bible. This is how they made sure of the accuracy of their translation.

The Holy Scriptures were delivered illegally to Russian Ukraine. Ivan Puluj's attempts through the Russian embassy in Vienna to obtain permission for its distribution in the Russian Empire ended in a categorical refusal or were unanswered.

=== Motivation ===
Panteleimon Kulish was guided by the belief that Ukrainians have the right to translate the Bible into Ukrainian. Starting in the 1860s, he worked on the translation of the Bible and encouraged Ivan Nechui-Levitsky in 1867 - 1869 to work on the translation. In 1869, Kulish, together with Nechui-Levitsky, was involved in the translation with Ivan Puluj. In the last years of his life, Panteleimon Kulish devoted himself almost entirely to translating the Bible. According to the Ukrainian linguist Roksolana Zorivchak, Kulish "was guided by the desire to turn Ukrainians from an ethnic group into a political nation." Ivan Puluj saw the publication of the translation as his patriotic duty. At the same time, Kulish, as a translator of the Bible, was guided not only by national interests, but also by all human ideals.

=== Features ===
The complete translation was made from the Hebrew and Greek texts into the modern Ukrainian language. The Greek edition of the London Bible Society of 1866 was taken as the basis for the translation by Kulish and Puluj. In the translation, there is a certain unevenness of the presentation style, caused by the fact that three authors worked on it. A rich language vocabulary is used, but the reason for the less convenient translation is explained by the lack of a translation tradition, and the lack of unification on the vision of the language standard in the Ukrainian language, given the fact that both Western and Eastern Ukrainian language elements were used. Panteleimon Kulish, not knowing what the reaction of Ukrainians to the translation of the Bible might be, applied his own translation strategy. At first, he took folk poetry and spoken language as a basis.

For example, Panteleimon Kulish and Ivan Nechuy-Levytskyi were speakers of the eastern variant of the Ukrainian language: Kulish - northern, Nechuy-Levytskyi - southeastern. Ivan Puluj is a native speaker of the Western variant of the Ukrainian language. All of the regional language motifs coexist in the translation.

In the Bible of 1903, there is a convergence of two versions of the literary language, while a stronger orientation towards the Western version is noticeable as it was more developed at that time. It was represented by almost all functional styles, and among them - confessional.

The translators saw the use of dialect vocabulary as a way of enriching literary language, specifically in the Ukrainian translation of the Bible, which they believed should satisfy the spiritual needs of the widest social strata.

Analysis of dialect vocabulary in the translation reveals an extremely attentive approach of the translators to the Bible books. Kulish and Puluj both used rich Ukrainian folk vocabulary.

Panteleimon Kulish and Ivan Puluj selected commonly used, traditional phraseological devices, including those used in the works of writers and church figures of the late 16th and early 17th centuries by Ivan Vyshenskyi, Kyrylo Stavrovetsky, and others.

=== Editions ===
The translation has gone through a number of reprints in Vienna (1904, 1906, 1908, 1909, 1912, 1920) and Berlin (1910), and it had a certain influence on subsequent translations of the Bible. The anniversary editions of 1944 (New York), 1947 (London) and 2000 (Kyiv) have become rarities.

In 2007, the edition "Bible with commentary" was published in Minsk. The basis of this edition was the translation of Panteleimon Kulish, which was edited by Vasyl Boyechk and supplemented with comments by Donald Stamps.

On May 6, 1901, Puluj was visited by representatives of the Bible Society. Millard, the director of the bookselling society in Vienna, (son of the late Heinrich Millard) and Stahlschmid, the representative of the Society in Prague, stated that the Society intended to purchase the entire translation of the Old Testament. Puluj set a price of 5,000 guilders, which the Society undertook to pay to Oleksandra Kulish, Kulish's wife, and Ivan Nechuy-Levytskyi. This fact was to be brought to the notice of the London Society, and if it consented, the Old Testament would be published in one year. In 1900, on behalf of the Ukrainian intelligentsia in Kyiv, the composer Mykola Lysenko began negotiations with Ivan Puluj regarding the publication of the Bible translated by Kulish and Nechuy-Levytskyi. In October 1901, Ivan Puluj received a copy of the translation, and the British Society bought the perpetual right to publish the Old Testament without having seen the translations themselves, relying only on Puluj's word.

In June 1901, the Bible Society agreed to buy a translation of the Old Testament for 5,000 guilders. The publishing house was chosen by the Holzhavsen printing house in Vienna. However, in the process of typing the text in the mentioned printing house, it turned out that the copies of the Bible did not always correspond to the original: there were omissions, inaccuracies and errors in typing. Therefore, the printing of the publication was stopped. Ivan Puluj took up editing so as not to stop printing completely. Typing and printing were carried out depending on the editing by Puluj and Father Oleksiy Slyusarchuk, who was invited to work.

In December 1903, the British Bible Society published in Vienna a Ukrainian-language translation of the New and Old Testament by Kulish - Nechui-Levytsky - Puluj. A separate additional edition of the New and Old Testaments was published in June–July 1904. Puluj was also involved in the distribution of individual books of the Bible. The circulation of the first edition was 5,000 copies, and so was the circulation of the second, additionally edited edition. In addition, in 1906, the Ukrainian translation of the Kulish-Puluj Gospels together with the Church Slavonic text was published with the permission of the Synod of the Russian Orthodox Church and was distributed in Russian Ukraine. In turn, in 1908, the Bible Society in Berlin, under the supervision of Puluj, published Ukrainian translations of the New Testament and Psalms together with the English text for Ukrainian emigrants in Canada. Ivan Puluj also sent the Bible to Metropolitan Andrey Sheptytsky and various Ukrainian educational institutions.

== Reviews ==
The publication of the Bible did not become a notable event in the life of the church in Ukraine (neither under-Russian nor under-Austrian), since it was never recommended by the higher church leadership for worship, although it caused a certain resonance among cultural figures of Ukraine. One of the most respected Russian magazines, Vestnik Evropy, rated the translation highly, in an overview of Ukrainian translations of the Holy Scriptures since the 16th century.

== Criticism ==
Mykola Sagarda enthusiastically wrote that Panteleimon Kulish's translation "reflects the deep understanding and high inspiration of a person who invested in it all his great knowledge of his native language, all his love for it and God's word, his whole soul. Kulish really forced Moses, Isaiah and all the other prophets to speak in very good Ukrainian." Ivan Franko believed that the first Ukrainian Bible did not live up to the hopes of both Panteleimon Kulish himself and the general public of Ukrainians. Ilarion Ohienko pointed out the lack of rhythmicity and lack of melody: "But actually the biblical language is the language of prayer, the language of the soul, the language of singing."

== Value ==
The appearance of the Bible in the Ukrainian language was a significant event especially for Russian occupied Ukraine, where it arrived illegally through Austria-Hungary. The Liturgical Commission in Rome under the leadership of Patriarch Josyf Slipyj recognized the Bible of Kulish, Levytsky, and Puluj as the most thorough and the best for its time, as stated in one of the publications of the magazine "Prager Nachrichten" in 1977.

However, until the revolution of 1905, almost no copy of the Ukrainian translation of the Bible could be officially imported into the Russian Empire. With such restrictions on the spiritual life of the Ukrainian people, the appearance of the Bible in the Ukrainian language was a significant event for all of Ukraine, but the book arrived there illegally.

Panteleimon Kulish sometimes allowed himself to freely translate biblical texts, and Ivan Puluj, who knew the Greek language well, when editing this translation, added even more Galicianisms to it than Kulish. This circumstance did not contribute to the fact that Kulish's translation became a model of the literary Ukrainian language.

At the same time, the translation of the Bible is evidence of Kulish's incredible informative work, which cannot be overestimated.

== Gallery ==
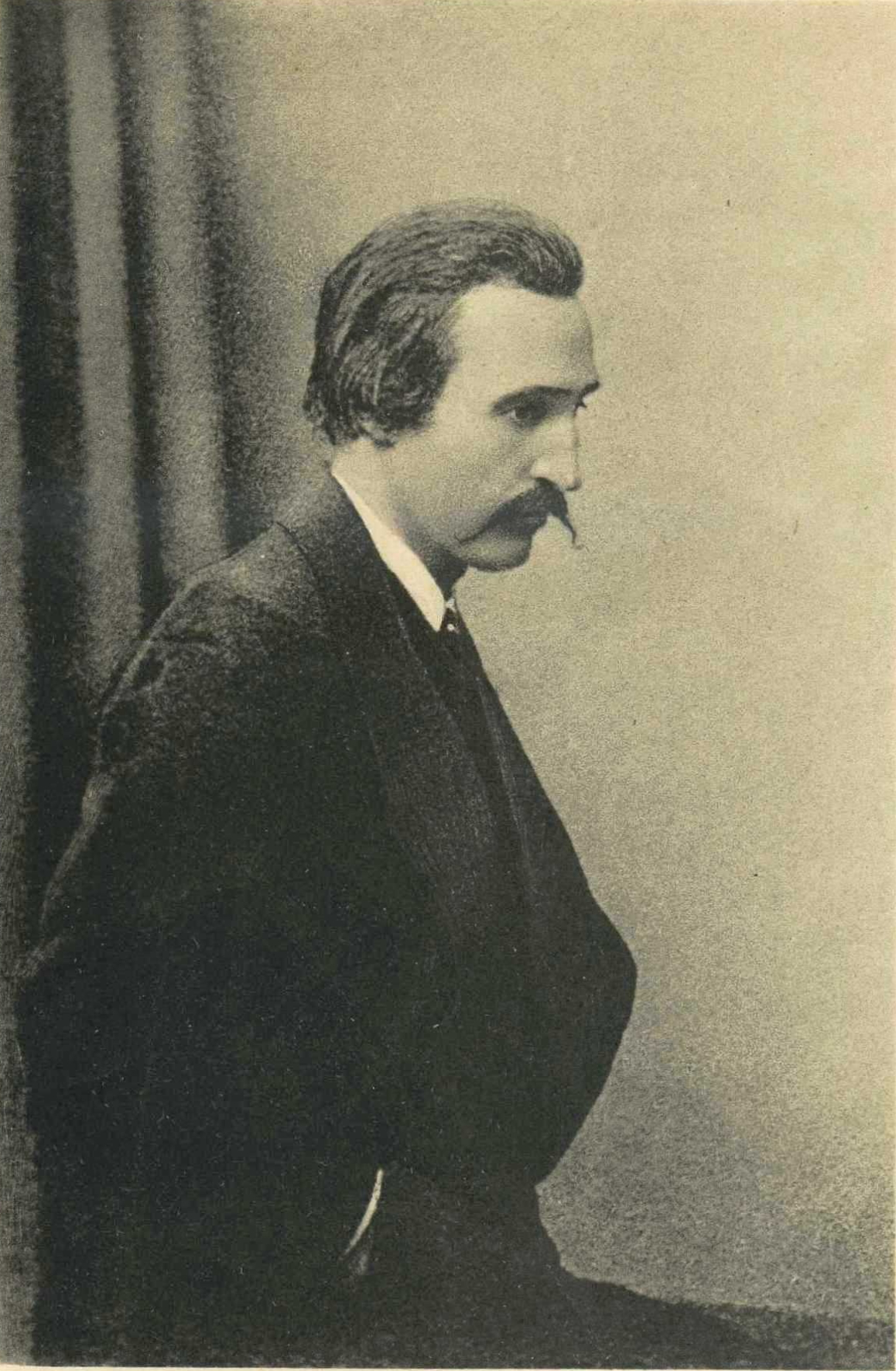
Panteleimon Kulish

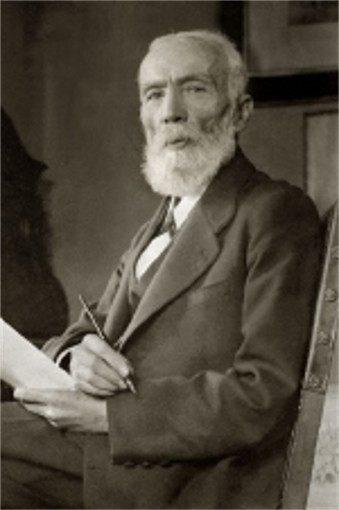
Ivan Puluj

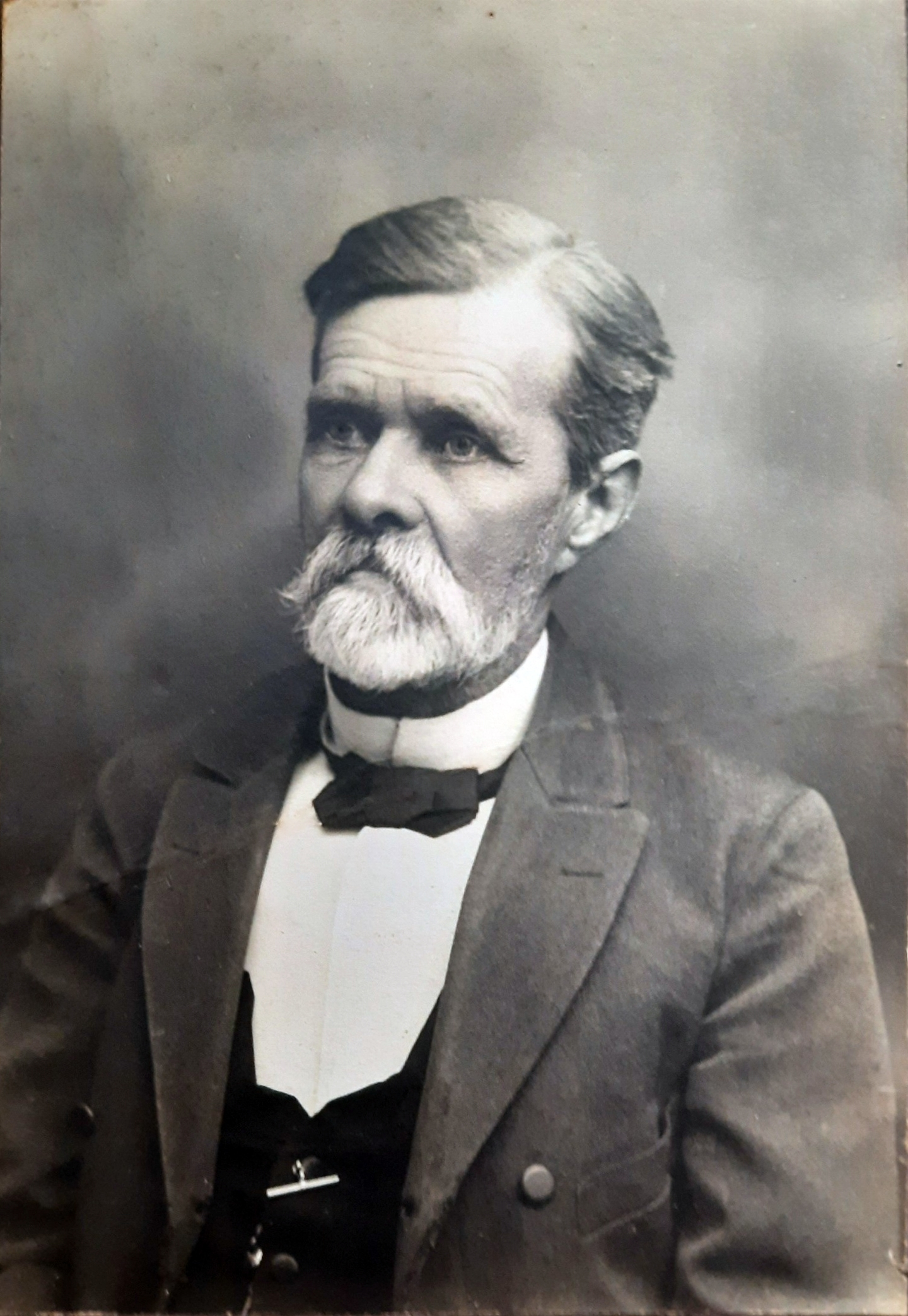
Ivan Nechuy-Levytskyi

== See also ==
- Bible translations into Ukrainian

== Sources ==
- Вініцька, А (2010). "Перший повний український переклад Біблії". 1 (Матеріали III Всеукраїнської студентської науково-технічної конференції «Природничі та гуманітарні науки. Актуальні питання», 22–23 квітня 2010 року). Тернопіль: Тернопільський державний технічний університет імені Івана Пулюя: 434.
- Грицюк, О (2009). "Перший повний український переклад Біблії". Матеріали II Всеукраїнської студентської науково-технічної конференції «Природничі та гуманітарні науки. Актуальні питання», 23–24 квітня 2009 року. 1. Тернопіль: Тернопільський державний технічний університет імені Івана Пулюя: 266.
- Дзера, О. В (2014). "Історія українських перекладів Святого Письма". Іноземна філологія. 127. Львів: Львівський національний університет імені Івана Франка: 214–222.
- Дзюбишина-Мельник, Н. Я (1998). "Українська Біблія 1903 року в контексті літературної мови початку XX століття" (Człowiek - dzieło - sacrum ed.). Opole: Uniwersytet Opolski, Instytut Filologii Polskiej: 275–282.
- Жижома, О. О (2018). "Перекладацька діяльність Пантелеймона Куліша" (Университетская наука-2018 в 3 т.: тез. докл. междунар. науч.-техн. конф. (Мариуполь, 23–24 мая 2018 г.) ed.). Мариуполь: ГВУЗ «ПГТУ»: 147–148. Archived from the original on 2022-01-23.
- Зеленська, Л (1995). "Іван Пулюй та подружжя Кулішів (за матеріалами чернігівських музеїв)". Сіверянський літопис. Чернігів: Чернігівська ОДА: 73–76.
- Коляда, І (2017). "Іван Нечуй-Левицький та Пантелеймон Куліш: до історії творчих взаємин". Науковий вісник Східноєвропейського національного університету ім. Лесі Українки. Серія: Історичні науки. Луцьк: СНУ ім. Лесі Українки: 22–26.
- Мащакевич, З. "Каталог "Святе Письмо"". Львівський музей історії релігій. Archived from the original on 2023-03-08.
- Мороз, Т (2020). "Маловідомі сторінки історії перекладів українською мовою книг Святого Письма від середини XIX – до середини XX століть": 1–25.
- Мороз, Т. В (2016). "Перший повний переклад Біблії українською мовою: історія створення та видання". Наукові праці Чорноморського державного університету імені Петра Могили комплексу «Києво-Могилянська академія». Серія: Філологія. Мовознавство. Наукові Праці [Чорноморського Державного Університету Імені Петра Могили Комплексу Києво-Могилянська Академія]. Серія: Філологія. Мовознавство. 266 (278, Вип. 266). Миколаїв: Чорноморський державний університет імені Петра Могили: 82–87. ISSN 2310-9858.
- Мороз, Т. В (2013). "Діалектне джерело лексики в мові творів Івана Франка та в українському перекладі Біблії 1903 року". Лінгвістичні дослідження. 36. Харків: Харківський національний педагогічний університет імені Г.С. Сковороди: 131–136. ISSN 2312-7546.
- Nachlik, J (1996). "Біблія в перекладах Пантелеймона Куліша". Roczniki Humanistyczne. Lublin: Towarzystwo Naukowe KUL Wydział Nauk Humanistycznych Katolickiego Uniwersytetu Lubelskiego Jana Pawła II: 129–144.
- Нікольченко, М. В (2018). "Переклади Бібліх українською мовою у XIX ст. (П. Морачевський, П. Куліш, І. Нечуй-Левицький)". Збірник матеріалів XX підсумкової науково-практичної конференції викладачів. Маріуполь: Маріупольський державний університет: 266–268.
- Стоцький, Я. В (2020). "Аналіз проблем процесу підготовки і видання першого повного україномовного перекладу біблії Куліша – Пулюя – Нечуй-Левицького: від рукопису до друку та розповсюдження". Матеріали міжнародної наукової конференції «Іван Пулюй: життя в ім'я науки та України» (до 175-ліття від дня народження), 28–30 вересня 2020 року. Тернопіль: ФОП Паляниця В. А.: 37–39. ISBN 978-617-7875-07-8.
- Тімофєєва, К. (2019). "Пантелеймон Куліш як українській інформатор (на матеріалі епістолярних джерел)". Образ. 32. Суми: Сумський державний університет: 30–38. doi:10.21272/Obraz.2019.3(32)-30-38.
- Ткач, Л.; Мороз, Т (2004). "Фразеологічні скарби української мови в перекладах книг Святого Письма (за текстами Куліша, Пулюя, Огієнка)". Науковий вісник Чернівецького університету:: «Слов'янська філологія». 214–215. Чернівці: Рута: 115–125.
- Шинкарук, О (2010). "Перший повний український переклад Біблії". 1 (Матеріали III Всеукраїнської студентської науково-технічної конференції «Природничі та гуманітарні науки. Актуальні питання», 22–23 квітня 2010 року). Тернопіль: Тернопільський державний технічний університет імені Івана Пулюя: 434.
