= Peresopnytsia =

Coordinates: 50°40′07″N 25°59′35″E

Peresopnytsia Пересопниця
- Village
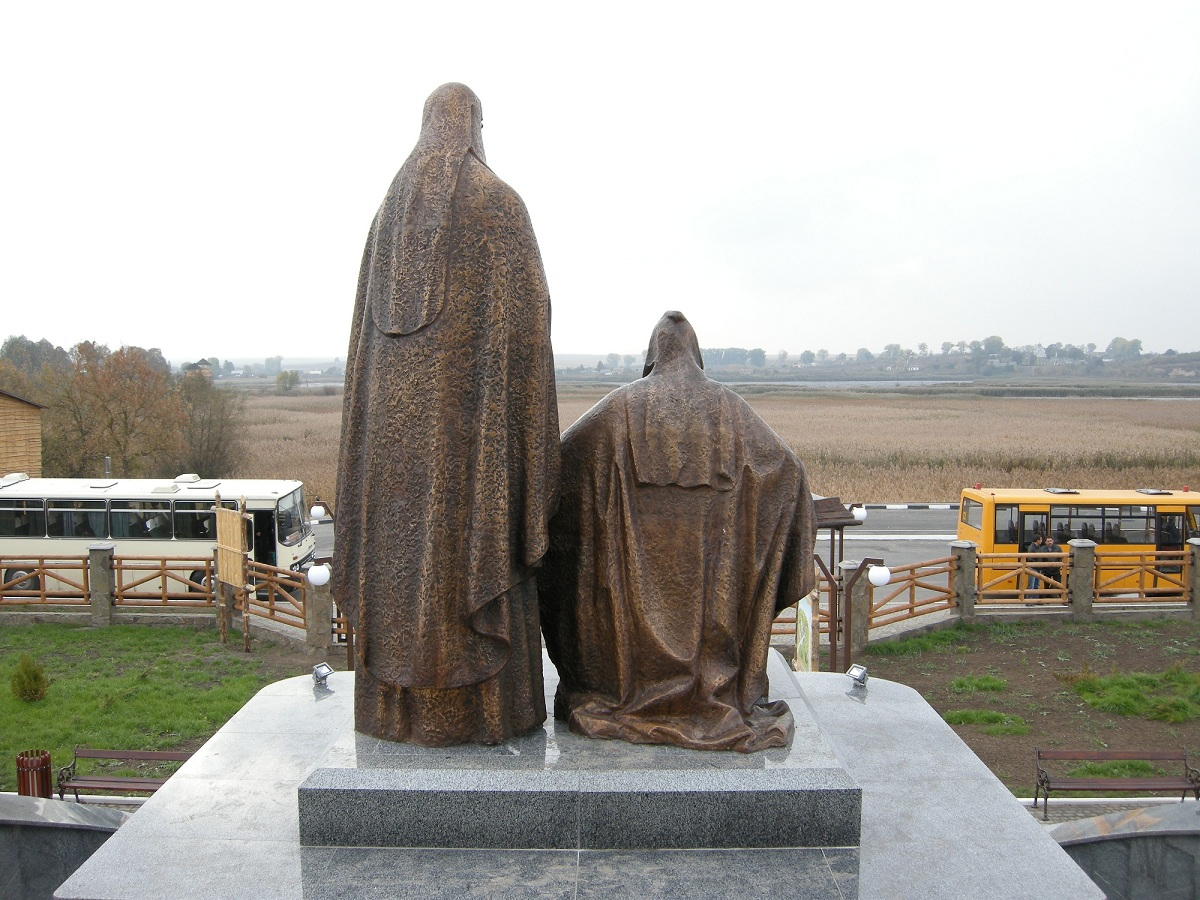
- Monument to Mykhailo Vasyliovych and Hryhorii

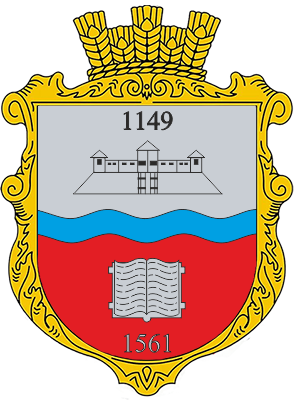
- Coat of arms
- Interactive map of Peresopnytsia
- Country: Ukraine
- Oblast: Rivne Oblast
- Raion: Rivne Raion
- Hromada: Diadkovychi rural hromada

Population (2001)
  - Total: 139

Peresopnytsia (Ukrainian: Пересопниця) is a small village of Rivne Raion in the Rivne Oblast, Ukraine. It belongs to the Diadkovychi rural hromada and is located on Stubly River, a tributary of Horyn River.

In 11th–13th centuries it was one of two main cities of Horyn River basin. In the 12th century Peresopnytsia was a capital of the Peresopnytsia principality which was a regional principality of the Principality of Volhynia.

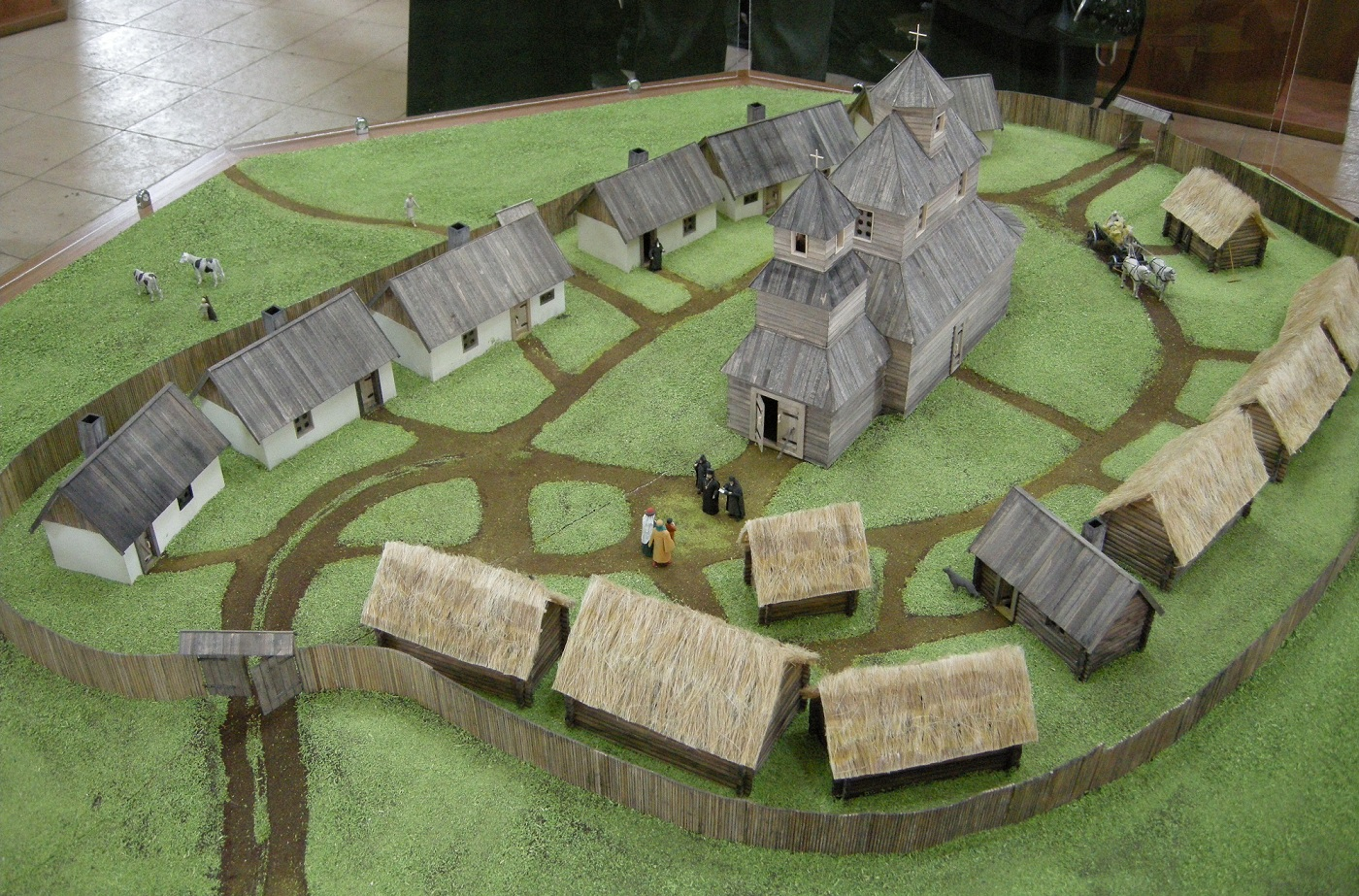
Model of the Peresopnytsia Monastery

On 29 August 1561, in the Peresopnytsia Monastery of the Blessed Virgin Nativity, creation of the Peresopnytsia Gospel was finished, which is now a national relic of Ukraine.

== Peresopnytsia princes ==
- 1147–1149 Viacheslav I of Kiev
- 1150–1150 Mstislav, son of Yuri Dolgorukiy
- 1150–1151 Andrey Bogolyubsky as prince of Peresopnytsia and Turov
- 1152–1154 Volodymyr, son of Andrei the Good
- 1155–1156 Mstislav II of Kiev
- ...
- 1180–1220 Mstislav the Mute, son of Yaroslav II of Kiev
- 1225–1229 Vasilko Romanovich
