= Voronizh =

Rural locality in Sumy Oblast, Ukraine

Voronizh Вороніж
- Rural settlement
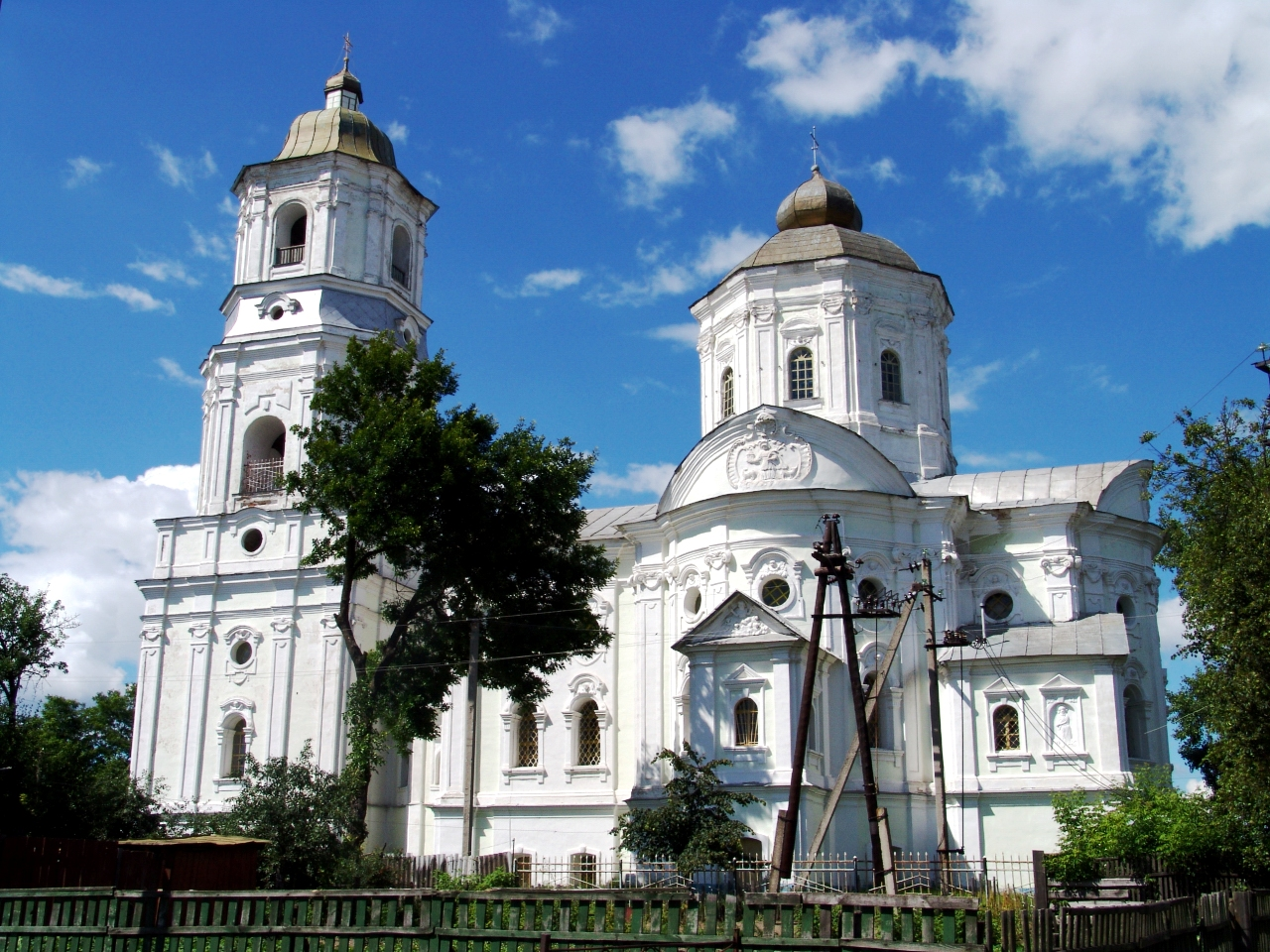
- Church of Saint Michael

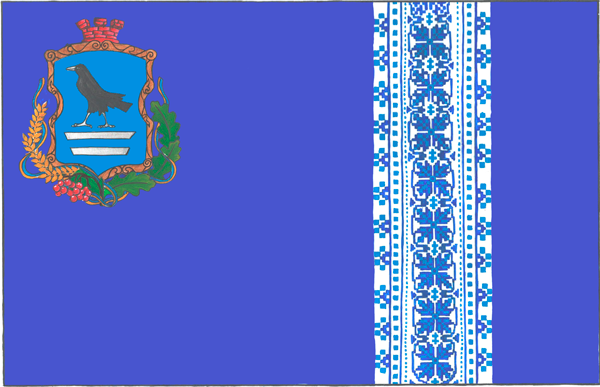
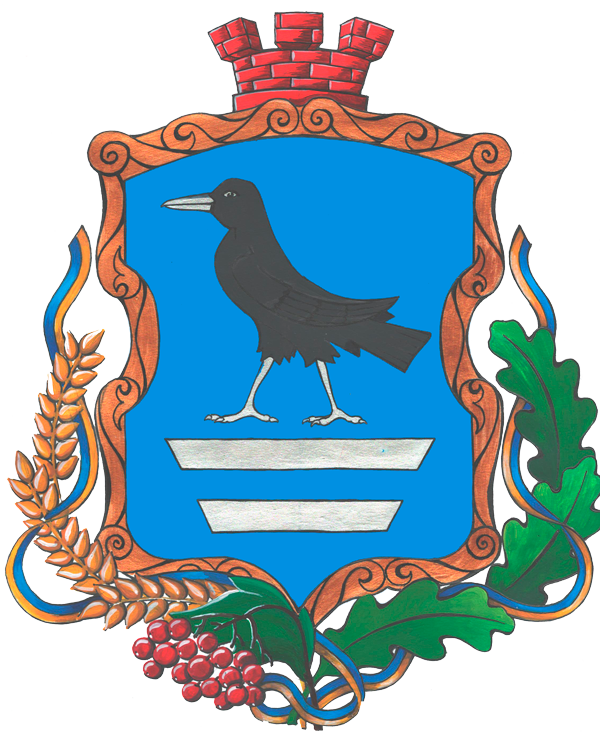
- Flag Coat of arms
- Interactive map of Voronizh
- Location in Sumy Oblast Location in Ukraine
- Country: Ukraine
- Oblast: Sumy Oblast
- Raion: Shostka Raion
- Hromada: Shostka urban hromada

Population (2022)
  - Total: 6,560
- Time zone: UTC+2 (EET)
  - Summer (DST): UTC+3 (EEST)

Voronizh (Ukrainian: Вороніж, IPA: [woˈrɔn⁽ʲ⁾iʒ]; Russian: Воронеж, romanized: Voronezh, IPA: [vɐˈronʲɪʂ]) is a rural settlement in Shostka Raion, Sumy Oblast, Ukraine. It is located on the banks of the Osota, a left tributary of the Desna, in the drainage basin of the Dnieper. Voronizh belongs to Shostka urban hromada, one of the hromadas of Ukraine. Population: 6,560 (2022 estimate).

== History ==
Voronizh was first mentioned in 1177. In 1854 a sugar refinery was established in the settlement, followed by an oil factory.

Until 26 January 2024, Voronizh was designated urban-type settlement. On this day, a new law entered into force which abolished this status, and Voronizh became a rural settlement.

== Economy ==
=== Industry ===
A sugar factory in Voronizh was built in the 1860s by Nikolay Tereshchenko. It was the largest industrial enterprise in the settlement until 2004, when it stopped operation.

=== Transportation ===
Tereshchenska railway station is located in Voronizh. It is on the main line connecting Kyiv and Moscow across the Russian border; there is also a side line to Shostka and Novhorod-Siverskyi which starts in Tereshchenska. There is intensive passenger traffic through the station. Until 2007, it was known as Voronezhska railway station.

The settlement is connected by road with Shostka and with Krolevets, where it has access to Highway M02 and further to Kyiv.

== Notable people ==
- Panteleimon Kulish (1819–1897), Ukrainian writer, critic, poet, folklorist, and translator
