= Diadkovychi rural hromada =

Municipality in Rivne Oblast, Ukraine

Diadkovychi rural hromada Дядьковицька сільська громада
- Hromada
- Interactive map of Diadkovychi rural hromada
- Country: Ukraine
- Oblast (province): Rivne Oblast
- Raion (district): Rivne Raion
- Established: 2018
- Administrative center: Diadkovychi

Area
  - Total: 156.98 km^{2} (60.61 sq mi)

Population
  - Total: 5,370
  - Density: 34.2/km^{2} (88.6/sq mi)

Diadkovychi rural hromada is one of the hromadas of Rivne Raion in Rivne Oblast of Ukraine. Its administrative centre is the village of Diadkovychi. The Dyadkovytsia territorial hromada is located west of Rivne. The larger area of the hromada is located in the Volhynian Upland, in the Pripyat River basin. Community population: 5712 (as of 01.01.2023).

== Composition ==
The community was established on December 23, 2018 by merging the Dyadkovytska, Verkhivska and Maloshpakivska rural districts. The hromada consists of 17 villages:

- Diadkovychi (administrative centre)
- Dvorovychi
- Humennyky
- Ivanychi
- Kryvychi
- Makoterty
- Malyi Shpakiv
- Mylostiv
- Peredily
- Peresopnytsia
- Pidhirtsi
- Ploska
- Shostakiv
- Velykyi Shpakiv
- Verkhivsk
- Yasynynychi
- Zaritsk

== Geography ==
The area of the Diadkovychi rural hromada is 157.1 km^{2}. Community population: 5712 (as of 01.01.2023). The Dyadkovytsia territorial hromada is located west of Rivne and borders the Rivne urban hromada.

The relief of the hromada is flat, partly lowland, covered with pine and oak forests. Diadkovychi rural hromada has reserves of peat, clay.

The larger area of the hromada is located in the Volhynian Upland. The Dyadkovytskyi rural hromada is located in the Pripyat River basin, with tributaries of the Horyn River flowing through the district. The climate of the region is moderately continental: winter is mild (in January -4.4 °, -5.1 °), with unstable frosts; summer is warm (in July +18.8 °), not hot. Most often, comfortable weather is observed in the summer months. The formation of stable snow cover is noted in the second decade of December. Rainfall 550 mm per year.

The territory of the Dyadkovytsia Village Council is dominated by gray podzolized soils and chernozem.

A highway runs through the settlements of the hromada, connecting the city of Rivne with the village of Mlyniv. In the immediate vicinity there is a national highway H-22 and an international highway M-06. At a distance of 15 km from the administrative center of the hromada there is an international airport in Rivne.

The agriculture of the Diadkovychi rural hromada specializes in growing grain crops, legumes, and oilseeds.
