= Ukrainian Bible Society =

Ukrainian Bible Society (Ukrainian: Українське Біблійне Товариство, romanized: Ukrainske Bibliine Tovarystvo), is a religious non-profit organization, established by representatives of different Christian denominations in Ukraine, who recognize the Bible as the Word of God. It is a member of the international association of United Bible Societies, which currently involves 145 national institutions of similar kind.

The main task of the Ukrainian Bible Society is to translate, publish and distribute the Bible and its portions.

The Bible Society in Ukraine began its work in 1815 as a network of several affiliates to the Russian Bible Society. After a long period of Soviet regime restrictions, the Ukrainian Bible Society was re-established in 1991. Among its founders were the All-Ukrainian Union of Evangelical Christian-Baptist Church, the All-Ukrainian Union of Evangelical Christians (Pentecostal), Ukrainian Greek Catholic Church, Ukrainian Orthodox Church - Kyiv Patriarchate, and the Seventh-day Adventist Church. Later they were joined by the Lutheran Church, Ukrainian Autocephalous Orthodox Church, Ukrainian Orthodox Church (Moscow Patriarchate), Roman Catholic Church in Ukraine.

Yakiv Dukhonchenko was the first President of the Ukrainian Bible Society beginning in 1991. Hryhoriy Komendant is carrying out the Presidential responsibilities at the present time (since 2007).

The Organization has four branches in Kyiv (Central branch), Kherson (Southern branch), Kharkiv (Eastern branch) and Lviv (Western branch). There is also a special department for Bible translation into modern Ukrainian language led by Father Rafail Turkoniak.

== Activities ==
The Ukrainian Bible Society is the initiator and active supporter of the official celebration of the Bible Day since 2004, when the Bible Day was celebrated for the first time in Ukraine. In all countries of the world, the Bible Day is celebrated on the last week-end of October.

In 2005, it distributed 174,721 copies of the Bible and 159,626 copies of the New Testament.

The new edition of the Ukrainian Bible translation by Ivan Khomenko with corrections introduced by a special work group was presented at the Ukrainian Catholic University in October 2007. This new edition had, by some estimations, an ecumenical character and included particular contributions of Catholics and Protestants.

In 2008 the Ukrainian Bible Society launched a new project for the Bulgarians, one of the larger ethnic minority groups in Ukraine. The assistance in obtaining Bibles in Bulgarian language for the project was provided by the United Bible Societies. According to project plans, the Bibles will be presented to national cultural centers, libraries, educational institutions, religious institutions and many individual Bulgarians wishing to read the Bible in their native language.

The cornerstone of a new building of UBS named "Bible House" was laid on Baumana Street in Kyiv in March 2008.

== Bible translation into Ukrainian ==
The known history of the Bible translation into Ukrainian began in the 16th century with Peresopnytsia Gospels, which included only four Gospels of the New Testament. Later in the 17-19th centuries, when the Ukrainian territory was a part of the Russian Empire, several other translations were made secretly because of the Russian Government restrictions on Ukrainian language.

At present there are several translations of Holy Scripture into Ukrainian done :

- 1903 Panteleimon Kulish translation; (Ukrainian: Переклад Куліша).
- 1957 Ivan Khomenko translation; (Переклад Хоменка) Rome. Translation by Catholic priest, including deuterocanonicals.
- 1942, 1962 Metropolitan Ilarion (Ivan Ohienko) translation; (Ukrainian: Переклад І. Огієнка) Commissioned by the UBS. Used by most Protestant churches in Ukraine today.
- 1997, Rafail Turkoniak translation (Ukrainian: переклад Турконяка). United Bible Societies. New Testament 1997, Old Testament in process.
- 2004, Patriarch Filaret (Mykhailo Denysenko) translation; (Ukrainian: Переклад Філарета)

New Testament only:

- 1906 Pylyp Morachevskyi translation; (Ukrainian:Євангеліє в перекладах Пилипа Морачевського) translation of the New Testament;
- 1971 G. Derkach New Testament (Ukrainian: Переклад Г. Деркача)
- 1989 Ukrainian Catholic University New Testament
