= Pylyp Morachevskyi =

Ukrainian poet (1806–1879)

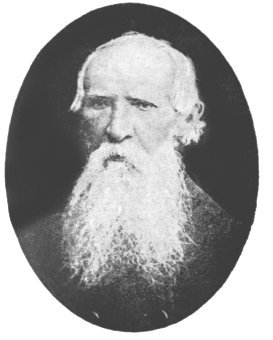
Pylyp Morachevskyi

Pylyp Semenovych Morachevskyi (Ukrainian: Пили́п Семе́нович Мораче́вський; 1806–1879) was a Ukrainian romantic poet, and translator of the New Testament into Ukrainian. He sometimes wrote under the pseudonym Khvylymon Haluzenko (Хвилимон Галузенко).

== Biography ==
He was born in the village of Shestovytsya in Chernihiv Oblast to a poor noble family, and studied at the local school in Chernihiv, then later at the University of Kharkiv. He began to work on Ukrainian language texts in the 1850s:

In 1853 Morachevsky submitted his Dictionary of the Little Russian Language, based on the Poltava dialect, to the Imperial Academy of Sciences. During his work on the dictionary, he realized that the Ukrainian language, which by then had been nearly squeezed out of schools, had a practically unlimited vocabulary.

— Klara Gudzyk, The Day

In 1859 he retired with his wife, three sons and two daughters to the village of Shnakivtsi in Nizhynsky County. In the 1860s he began his Bible translations into Ukrainian starting with the Gospels, completed in November 1861, then Acts of the Apostles Revelation and Psalms. He also wrote a Ukrainian "Sacred History" for elementary schools. However the Russian authorities did not permit the publication of his Ukrainian New Testament until after his death. In 1906 it was issued by Moscow Synod printing house, and immediately enjoyed great popularity.

== Works ==
His most famous poems include:

- Chumaks, or Ukraine in 1768 «Чумаки, або Україна з 1768 року»
- To a Chumak «До чумака, або Війна янгло-хранцузо-турецька»
