= Rafail Turkoniak =

Ukrainian Greek Catholic bishop

Hieromonk Rafail Turkoniak Archimandrite of UGCC
- Archimandrite, Honorary Professor, Doctor of Theology and Doctor of Liturgy
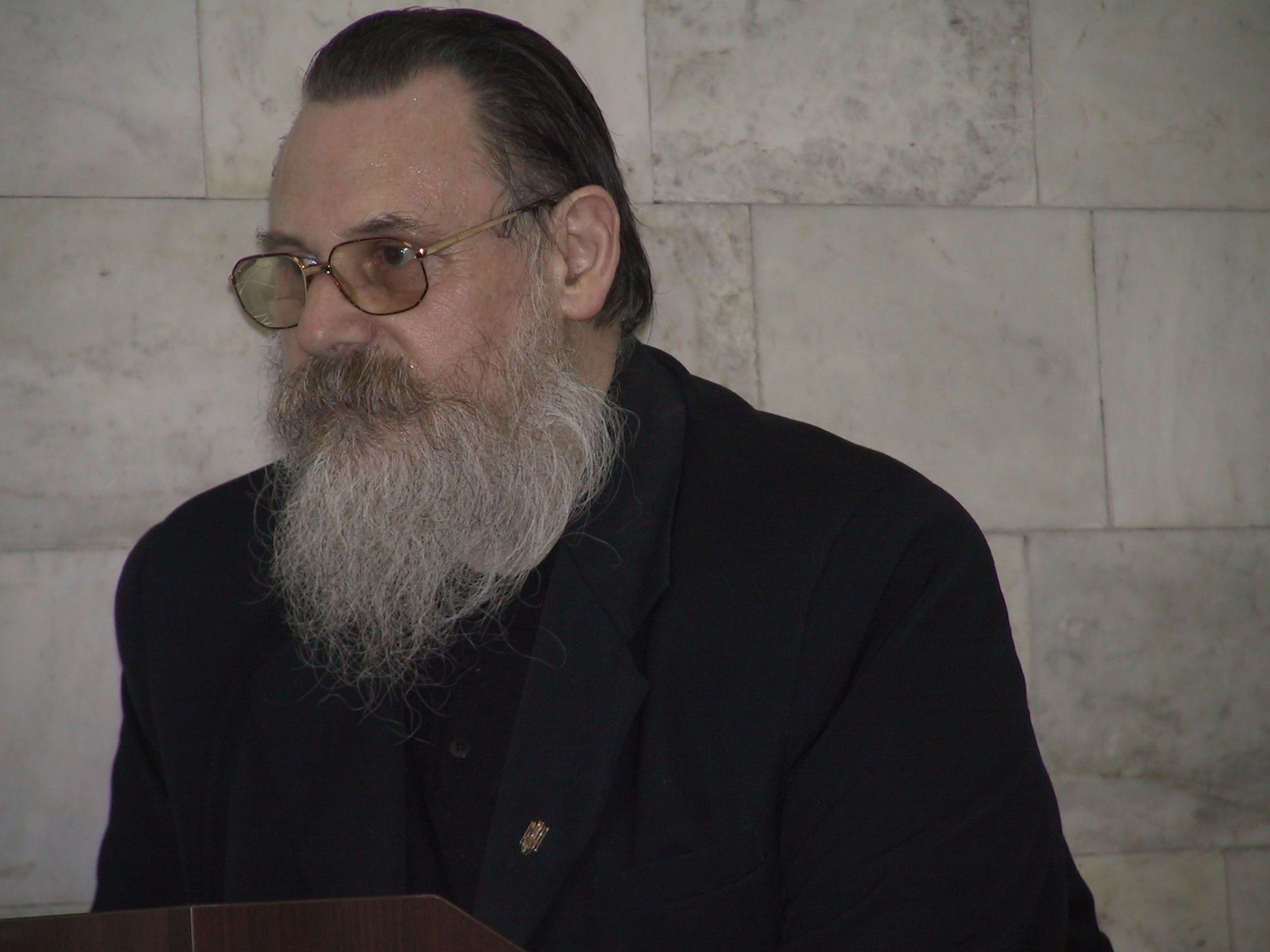
- Church: Ukrainian Greek Catholic Church

Orders
- Ordination: 2 April 1972 by Josyf Slipyj

Personal details
- Born: Raymond Turkoniak; 7 May 1949 (age 77) Manchester, England
- Residence: Lviv, Ukraine
- Occupation: priest, theologian, liturgist, biblical translator
- Education: Pontifical Urban University

Rafail Turkoniak (also Raymond (Roman) Pavlovych Turkoniak; Ukrainian: Рафаїл Турконяк; born 7 May 1949, Manchester) is an Archimandrite of the Ukrainian Greek Catholic Church, Doctor of Theology and Doctor of Liturgy, biblical translator, hieromonk of the Studite Statute, laureate of the Shevchenko National Prize for the translation of the Ostrih Bible into modern Ukrainian (2007), Honorary Professor and Head of the Department of Theology at the National University "Ostroh Academy".

== Biography ==
He was born on 7 May 1949 in Manchester, England in the family of Ukrainians Pavel Turkonyak and Stephanie Sas. He lived abroad — in Germany, USA and Italy. He is a US citizen and lives in Lviv.

From 1960 he studied at the Ukrainian Pontifical Minor Seminary in Rome. He completed his secondary education in June 1966, and the same year he entered the Ukrainian Pontifical College of Saint Josaphat in Rome. At the same time he studied philosophy at the Pontifical Urban University in Rome. In 1968 he received a bachelor's degree in philosophy. He continued to study theology at the College of St. Patrick in Maynooth, Ireland, and at the Faculty of Theology at the Pontifical Urban University and the Ukrainian Catholic University of St. Clement in Rome.

In June 1972 he graduated from the Pontifical Urban University in Rome with a master's degree in theology. He continued his scientific work in the specialization of "liturgy" and received a doctorate in theology from the Ukrainian Catholic University. In 1977 he received the degree of Doctor of Theology after defending his work entitled "The concept of the Church in Mineya Chetia Metropolitan Dmitry Tuptal of Rostov ".

At the age of 25 he entered the monastery of St. Theodore the Studite near Rome. On 13 October he became a novice, on 24 November he made his first vows. On 2 April 1972, he was ordained a priest by Metropolitan Josyf Slipyj and Bishop Vasyl Velychkovsky. From 1972 to 1976 he served the parish of the Ukrainian Greek Catholic Church in Krefeld, Germany.

In 1975, the head of the Ukrainian Greek Catholic Church, Josyf Slipyj, commissioned a translation of the Bible from a Slavic text for use in worship. During the work on the translation, the idea arose that it would be better to use the texts of the first complete Bible in the Old Slavonic language, which was published in the Ukrainian lands in Ostrih in 1581.

In 1978 he moved to the US and became abbot of the convent of the monks of the Studite Charter in Passaic, New Jersey. There he took care of the Parish of St. Father Nicholas in Passaic and the Parish of the Dormition of the Mother of God in Rutherford, New Jersey until 1990, when Studite monastery was relocated to Lviv. Among other responsibilities, he also taught programming at the parish school.

In 1991, Cardinal Myroslav-Ivan Lyubachivsky invited Fr. Raphael to the position of Vice-Chancellor of the Lviv Archdiocese. From 1993 to 1996, he served in the government of the Patriarchal Housekeeper of the Ukrainian Greek Catholic Church. In April 1995 he was elevated to the rank of Archimandrite.

From 1995 to 1996, by order of the patriarch, he organized and headed the Kyiv-Vyshhorod Exarchate for the Ukrainian Greek Catholic Church

In 1996 he was appointed Secretary of the Patriarch of the Ukrainian Greek Catholic Church, Cardinal Myroslav-Ivan Lyubachivsky.

In December 1992, he became a member of the Ukrainian Bible Society and was commissioned to produce the 4th complete translation of the Holy Scriptures from the ancient Greek language (completed in 2007), while continuing to work on a critical edition of the Ostroh Bible. Additionally, he is a head of a department for Bible translation into modern Ukrainian language. In 2000 there was published Rafail Turkoniak's translation of the Bible into modern Ukrainian from Hebrew and Ancient Greek languages.

In 2006 he published translation from Old Church Slavonic (the Ostrih Bible, 2006).

In 2007 he received Ukraine's National Shevchenko Prize.

Accomplishing a Ukrainian translation of Ostroh Bible by Rafail Turkoniak laid a foundation for the creation of an Ivan Kardash Centre of Anciently Printed Books.

He also contributed to the translation of the Reims Gospel, which was published in 2010.

== See also ==
- Bible translations into Ukrainian
