= Stebliv =

Rural locality in Cherkasy Oblast, Ukraine

Stebliv Стеблів
- Rural settlement
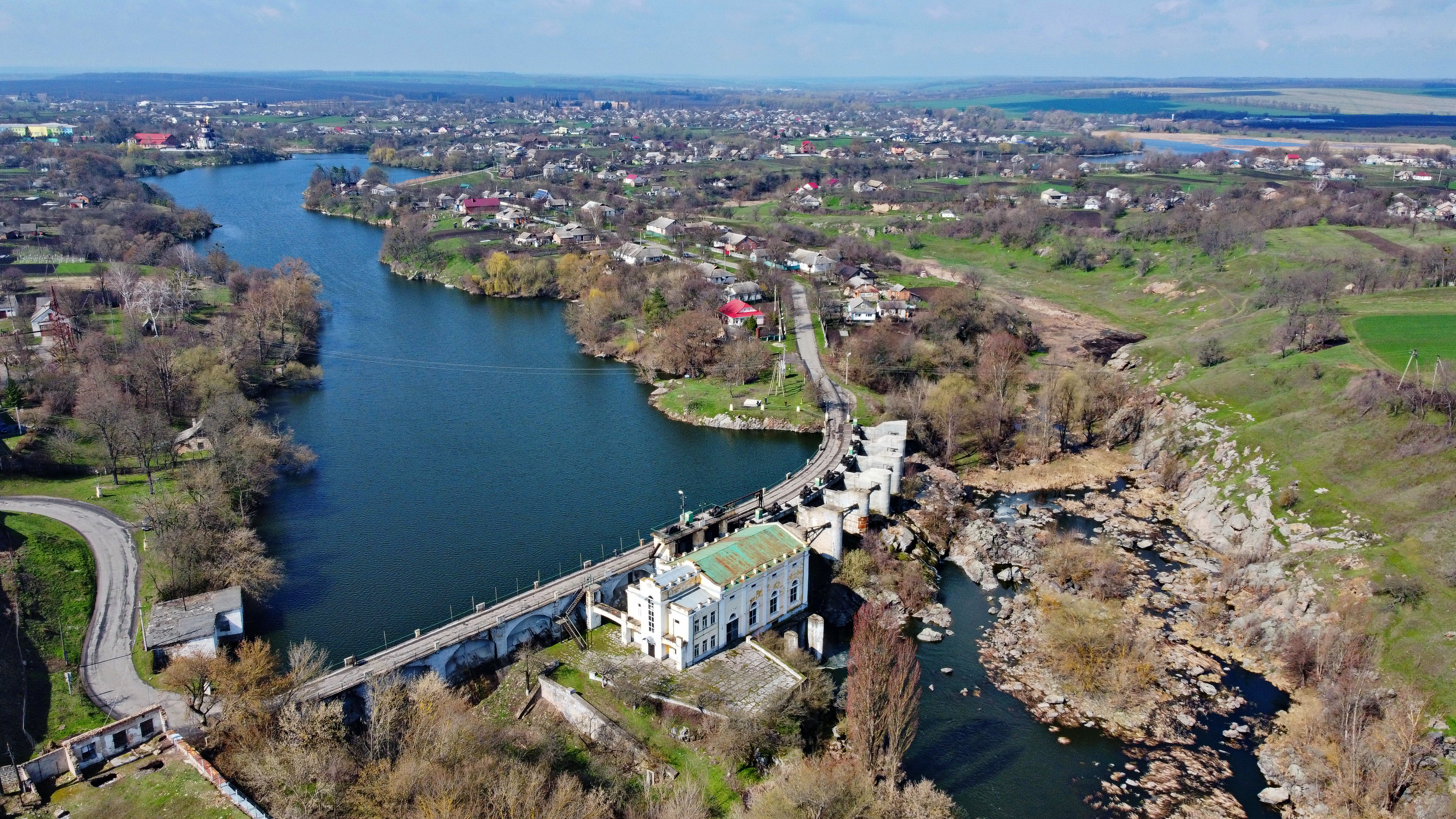
- Aerial view of Stebliv

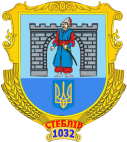
- Coat of arms

- Location of Stebliv Stebliv (Ukraine)
- Coordinates: 49°23′59″N 31°05′51″E
- Country: Ukraine
- Oblast: Cherkasy Oblast
- Raion: Zvenyhorodka Raion
- Hromada: Stebliv settlement hromada

Population (2022)
  - Total: 3,280
- Postal code: 19451
- Area code: +380 4735

Stebliv (Ukrainian: Стеблів) is a rural settlement in Zvenyhorodka Raion, Cherkasy Oblast, central Ukraine. It hosts the administration of Stebliv settlement hromada, one of the hromadas of Ukraine. The townlet rests at a bend on the Ros River, some 16 kilometres (9.9 mi) from Korsun-Shevchenkivskyi. Population: 3,280 (2022 estimate).

== History ==
Situated on the Ros' River, water surrounds most of the historically settled areas of Stebliv, which is also protected by cliffs and natural ramparts. Given the evidence of Trypillian, Scythian, and Chernyakhov culture settlements, the area has been populated for quite some time and was very often the site of fierce battles. In 1036, Yaroslav the Wise built a fortress at Strebliv which overlooked the southernmost lands of Rus, and it stood there until the eventual Mongol invasion.

Stebliv was later settled by Cossacks who took part in several uprisings against the Polish rule of the territory, particularly the fateful Khmelnytsky Uprising. On March 15, 1648, Khmelnytsky's forces routed Polish forces who had taken a superior tactical position between Stebliv and Korsun. In 1664, hopelessly outnumbered by 20,000 Polish troops which had an additional force of 15,000 Tatars in support, the residents of Stebliv advanced on their enemies and fought to their deaths; the town was destroyed after their defeat.

Until 18 July 2020, Stebliv belonged to Korsun-Shevchenkivskyi Raion. The raion was abolished in July 2020 as part of the administrative reform of Ukraine, which reduced the number of raions of Cherkasy Oblast to four. The area of Korsun-Shevchenkivskyi Raion was split between Cherkasy and Zvenyhorodka Raions, with Stebliv being transferred to Zvenyhorodka Raion.

Until 26 January 2024, Stebliv was designated urban-type settlement. On this day, a new law entered into force which abolished this status, and Stebliv became a rural settlement.

== Notable people ==
Stebliv was the birthplace of Ivan Nechuy-Levytsky, a prominent Ukrainian 19th-20th century writer; his original house has been preserved as a museum in Stebliv dedicated to his life and work.

The famous Ukrainian dancer and choreographer Vasyl Avramenko was also born in Stebliv.

== Gallery ==
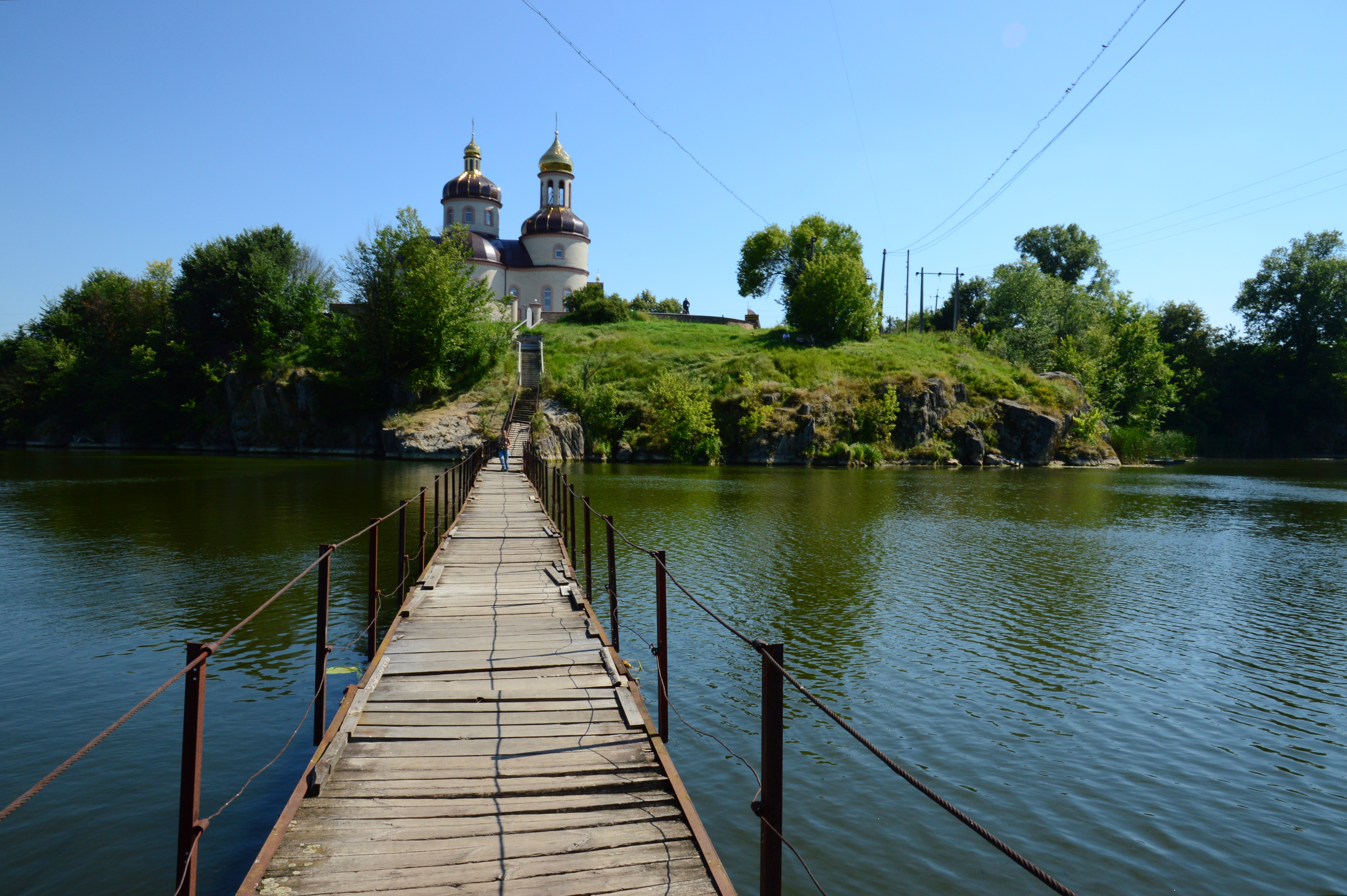
Bridge across the Ros' river

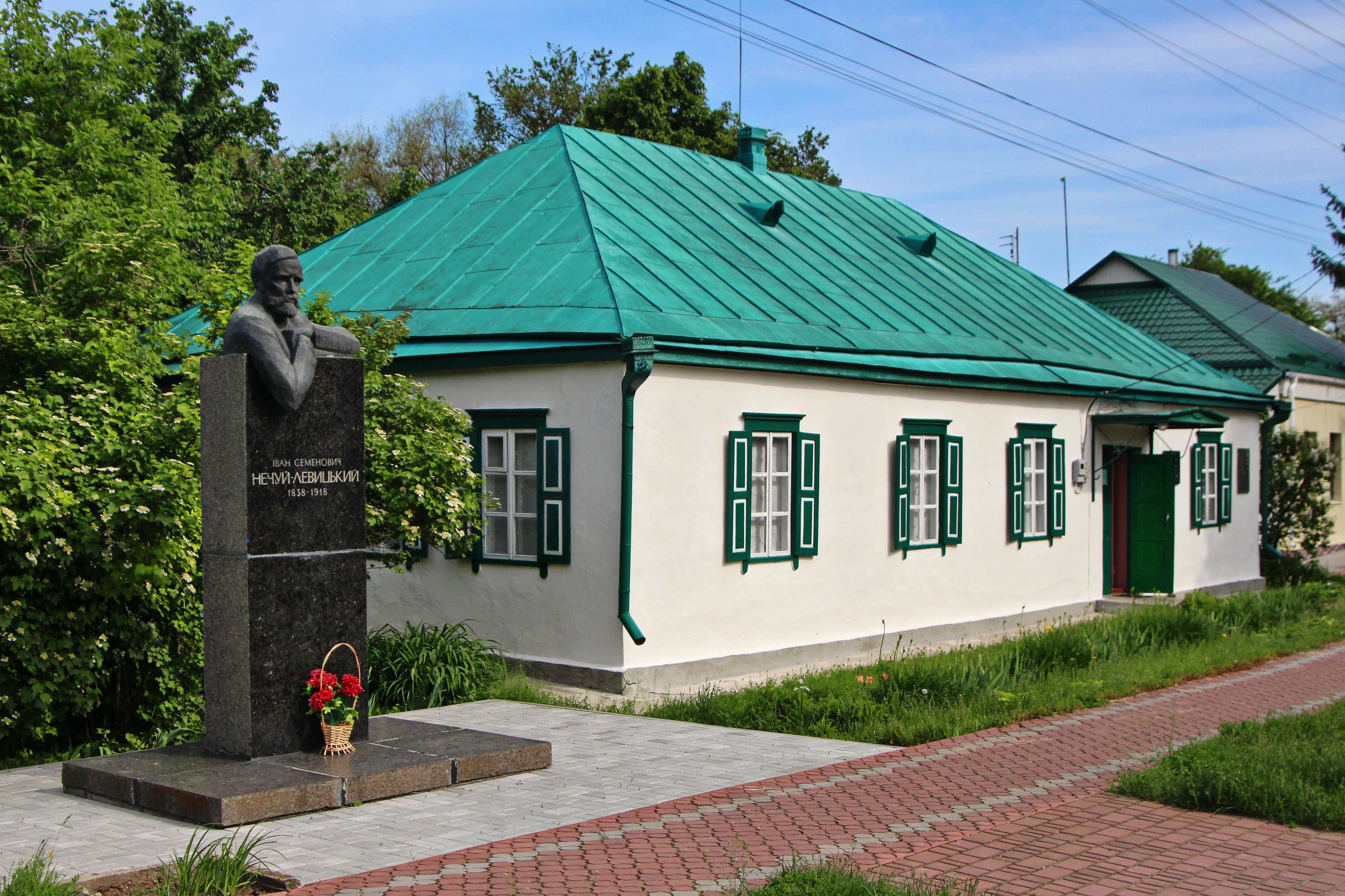
Nechuy-Levytsky's house

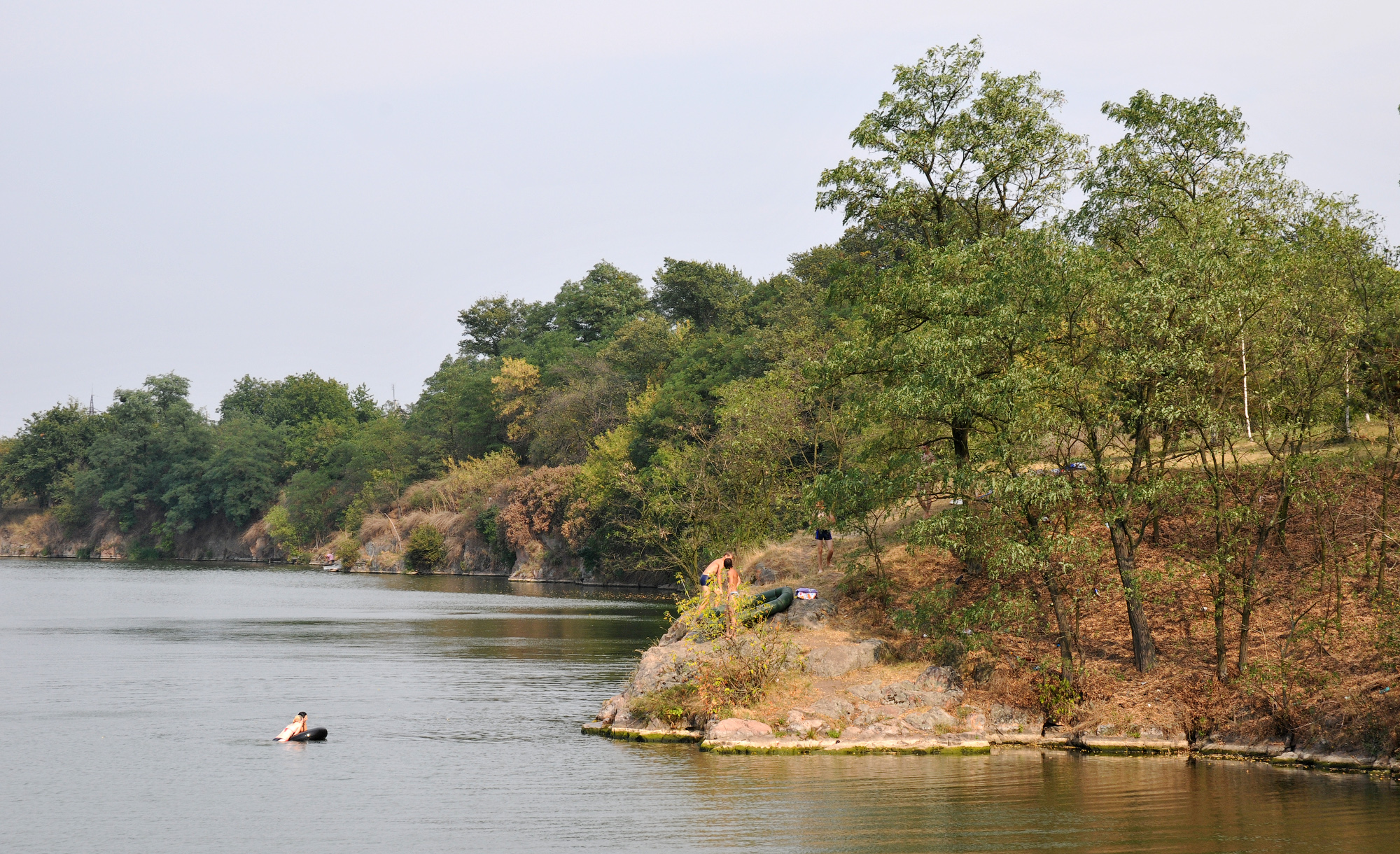
Water reservoir

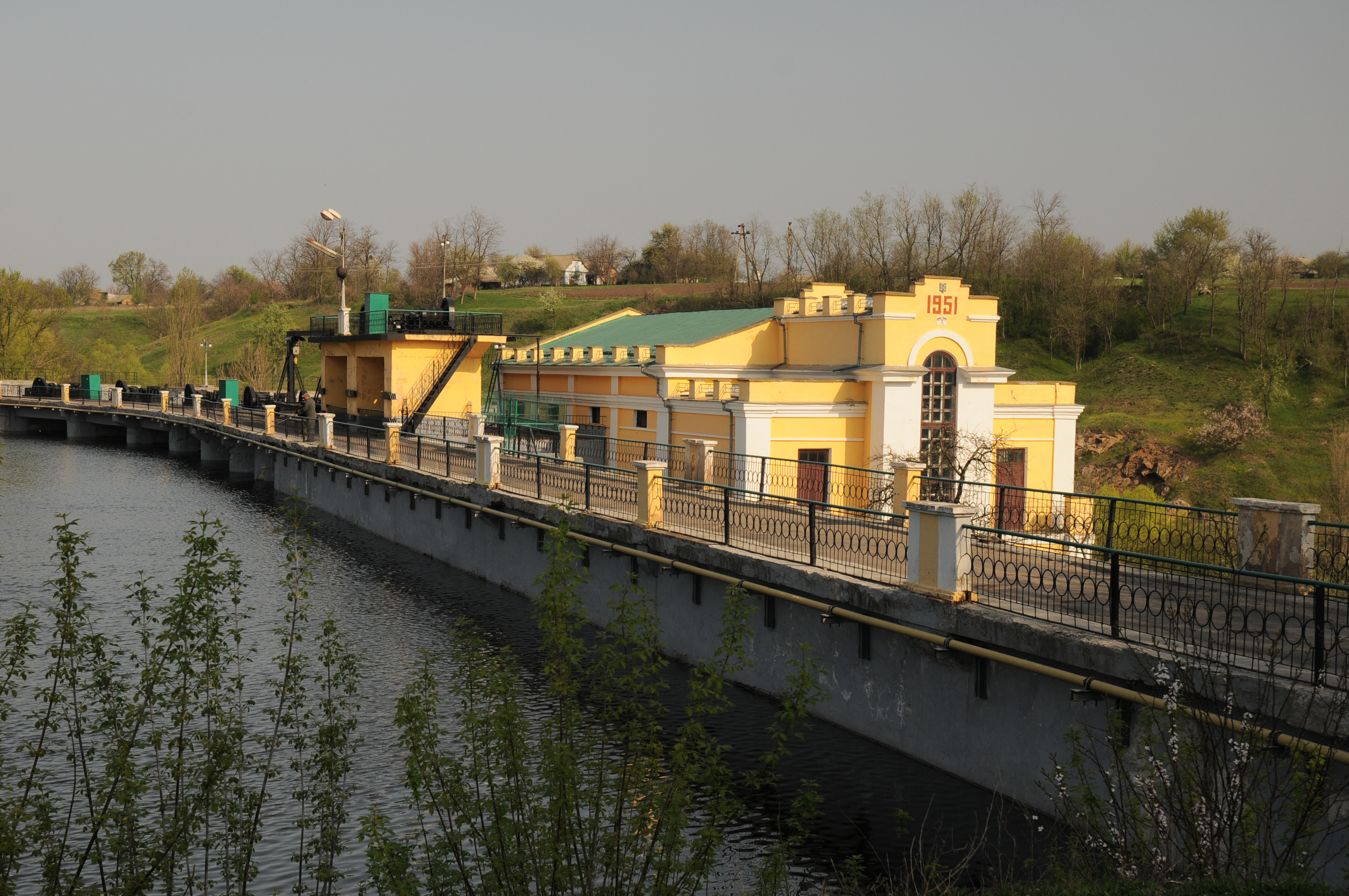
Hydroelectric plant
