= Mykola Dzheria =

Mykola Dzherya
- Author: Ivan Nechuy-Levytsky
- Original title: Микола Джеря
- Language: Ukrainian
- Genre: Social realism
- Published: 1878

Mykola Dzherya is a social realist novella by Ukrainian writer Ivan Nechuy-Levytsky, dedicated to Mykola Lysenko. Written in 1876 and published in 1878, the work depicts the struggles of a serf, Mykola Dzherya, who rebels against injustice and flees his village, leaving his family behind.

== Plot ==
Mykola Dzheria is a young serf living in the Ukrainian village of Verbivka. He marries Nymydora, but their family life is overshadowed by the demands of the local landowner. Mykola repeatedly challenges the treatment of the serfs and eventually flees the village with several companions to escape punishment, leaving his wife and daughter behind.

The fugitives find work in sugar factories before travelling to Bessarabia, where Mykola becomes a fisherman. He spends many years away from home, while Nymydora raises their daughter alone and continues to hope for his return. She eventually dies without seeing him ever again.

Following the abolition of serfdom in 1861, Mykola returns to Verbivka and discovers that his daughter has grown up and married. He settles with her family, but continues to challenge local authorities over the treatment of peasants and the distribution of land. His opposition leads to further imprisonment, although he eventually returns to live out his remaining years in the village.

== Themes ==
Ivan Nechuy-Levytsky portrays Mykola Dzherya as a resolute figure, loyal to his community and the peasantry. Mykola gains no fame or wealth from his struggles with his reward being personal integrity, remaining true to his principles and retaining a rebellious spirit even in old age. Written 17 years after serfdom’s abolition, the novella critiques not only serfdom but broader social inequalities of that time. The exploited and exploiters are depicted as irreconcilable social systems. Mykola endorses just retribution against oppressors while preventing his companions from looting.

However, the author condemns Mykola’s flight from the village, which leaves it defenseless against the landlord’s tyranny and abandons his wife and daughter, despite Nymydora’s constant presence in his thoughts.

== Writing and Publication History ==
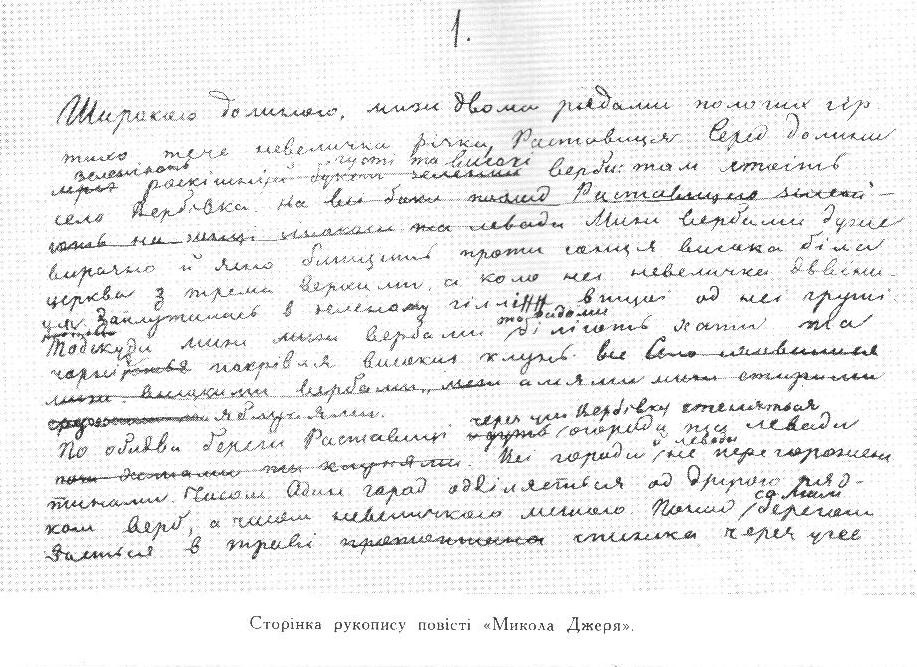
Manuscript page of the novella Mykola Dzherya

In a letter to Oleksandr Konysky, Nechuy-Levytsky mentioned writing a novella, “Servant Yarish Dzherya,” which he lost abroad. It is unclear whether this was an early version of Mykola Dzherya or a separate work. The confirmed text of Mykola Dzherya was sent for publication to Lviv, to the editorial office of Pravda, where it was first published. Nechuy-Levytsky chose this outlet, knowing that intensified censorship in Russia would prevent its printing. The manuscript and proofs of the first edition have not survived; only printed copies remain.

In 1880, Nechuy-Levytsky submitted a copy of the Pravda edition to the Main Directorate for Press Affairs in St. Petersburg. Censors rejected it, citing non-compliance with orthographic norms. After revising the text to meet these standards, he resubmitted it in 1881. On March 19, 1882, the St. Petersburg Censorship Committee permitted printing with some excisions. However, the novella appeared not as a standalone book but in Mykhailo Starytsky’s almanac Rada in 1883, with censors removing problematic sections. In 1886, Nechuy-Levytsky submitted the Pravda edition to the Kyiv Censorship Committee, but the Chief of the Main Directorate banned its publication in the Russian Empire.

In 1892, with support from the Lviv newspaper Dilo in its “Library of the Most Famous Novellas” series, Mykola Dzherya was published as a standalone book. The author made concessions, shortening and revising passages criticizing the clergy and church. To publish in Russia in Ukrainian, Nechuy-Levytsky further cut descriptions, softened his stance on the church, and removed details. Publication was not approved until 1898, when his fame as an author secured permission. The 1899 St. Petersburg edition appeared in the first volume of his works, Novellas and Stories. He continued refining the text, aiming for an uncensored standalone edition.

In March 1900, the Pravda edition was again submitted to Kyiv’s censors but rejected by St. Petersburg. Nechuy-Levytsky made no further attempts at standalone publication. The final edition during his lifetime, in 1909, was part of the first volume of Novellas and Stories. This version was divided into eight chapters instead of six, with typographical errors and awkward phrases corrected. The 1909 edition noted the writing date as “January 1, 1876” and was the first to use the author’s full name, “Ivan Nechuy-Levytsky,” on the title page.

After Nechuy-Levytsky’s death, Mykola Dzherya was published over 30 times. It appeared in Russian in Kharkiv (1929) and Moscow (1956). Until 1965, editions were censored; that year, the uncensored text was published in the third volume of his Collected Works in Ten Volumes as the author intended.

A draft manuscript of the novella is preserved in the manuscripts department of the Vernadsky National Library of Ukraine (Fund 1, No. 7435).

In 1985, the novella was translated into English.

== Adaptations ==
- 1926 — Mykola Dzherya, directed by Yosyp Rona and Marko Tereshchenko.
- 2019 — Filming began for Dzherya, directed by Iryna Pavlylo, with support from the Ukrainian Cultural Foundation.

== Influence on Popular Culture ==
In Oleksandr Irvanets’s book Kharkiv 1938, the names Mykola Dzherya and Kharytia are used as generic terms (nomen appellativum), symbolizing a youth organization in the Ukrainian SSR. Initiation rituals, termed “kharytyzation” for girls and “dzheryzation” for boys, mark a socio-political entry into adulthood for 12-year-olds. Boys undergo a secret ceremony, while girls publicly cut their finger with a sickle.
