= Ivan Nechuy-Levytsky =

Ukrainian writer

Ivan Nechuy-Levytsky Іван Нечуй-Левицький
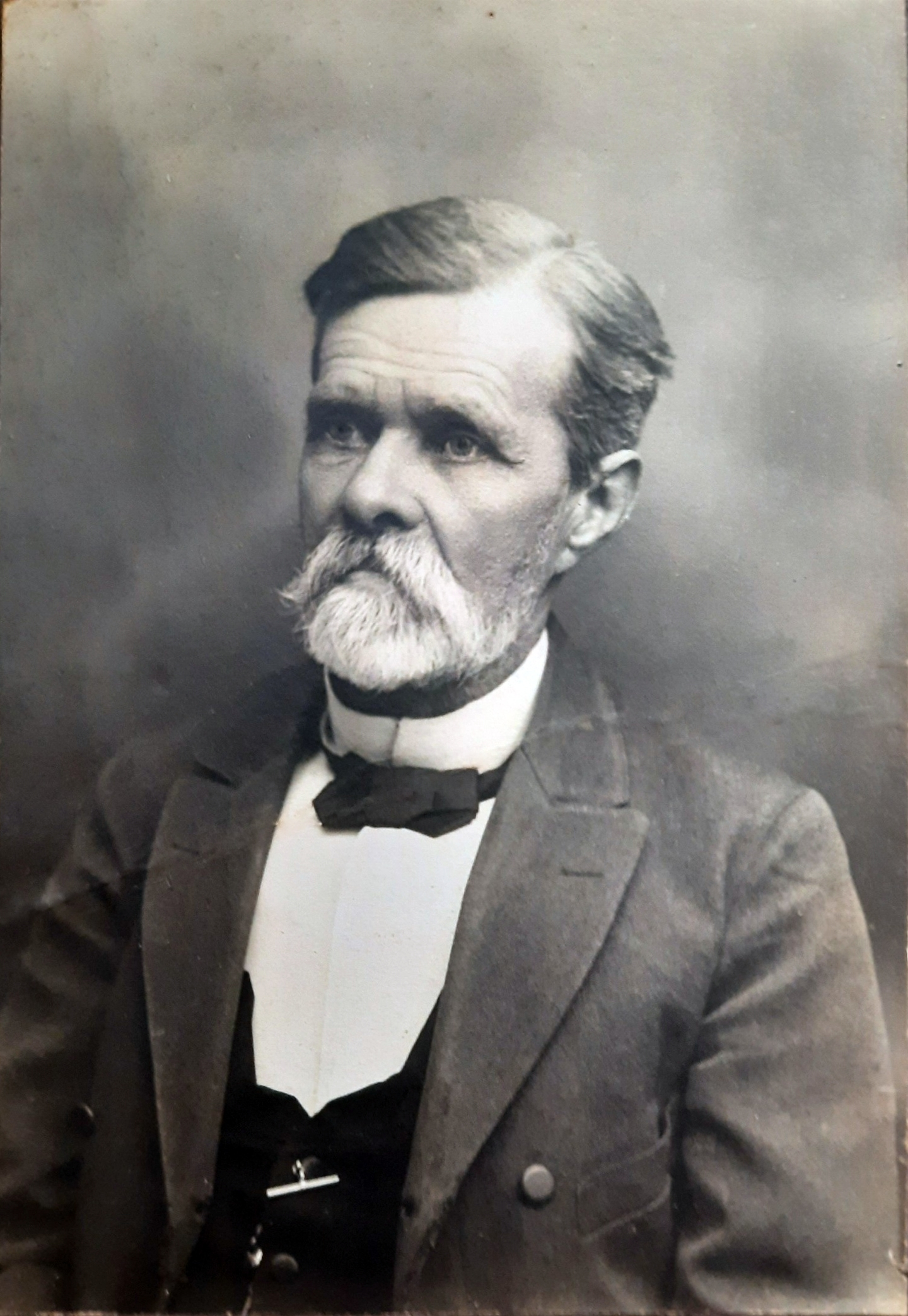
- Born: 25 (13) November 1838; Stebliv, Kiev Governorate, Russian Empire
- Died: 2 April 1918; Kiev, Ukrainian People's Republic
- Occupation: Writer
- Writing career
- Pen name: Nechuy, Bashtovyi
- Period: 1865–1914
- Notable work: Mykola Dzheria
- Literary movement: Literary realism

Ivan Nechuy-Levytsky (Ukrainian: Іван Нечуй-Левицький, Ukrainian pronunciation: [iˈwan neˈt͡ʃui̯ leˈwɪt͡sʲkɪi̯], born Ivan Semenovych Levytsky, Іван Семенович Левицький; 25 November [O.S. 13 November] 1838 – 2 April 1918) was a well-known Ukrainian author, playwright, translator, teacher, and master of theology.

== Biography ==
Ivan Nechuy-Levytsky was born on 25 November [O.S. 13 November] 1838 to the family of a peasant priest in Stebliv (Cherkasy Oblast in central Ukraine). His father, Semen Stepanovych, was an educated man with progressive views, who, contrary to the instructions of the Holy Synod, preached sermons in Church in Ukrainian. Semen Stepanovych independently funded the Stebliv lyceum, in which his son, Ivan, learned to read and write. From a young age, Ivan Levytsky was familiarised with Ukrainian history and literature from the books in his father's home library, where he read the works of Taras Shevchenko, Yevhen Hrebinka, Mykola Markevych, and several others. At the age of seven, his father took him to the neighbouring town of Bohuslav, where his uncle, Evtrop Lukyanovich, a teacher at the Bohuslav Religious Seminary, was tutoring the boy for entery to the school.

In 1847 he entered the Bohuslav religious school, where, among other subjects, he studied Russian, Latin, and Greek. Upon completing his education at the Bohuslav religious school, at the age of fourteen, he was transferred into the Kiev Theological Seminary, where he studied from 1853 to 1859. There, he studied German, taught himself French, and was introduced to the literature of Alexander Pushkin, Nikolai Gogol, and Dante Alighieri. Ivan graduated from the seminary ill and exhausted, and could not continue his studies. He lived with his father in Stebliv for a year (1859–1860), after which he began working as a teacher at the Bohuslav Religious Seminary, where he taught grammar, geography, and arithmetic. Ivan worked at the school from 22 April 1860 - 20 September 1861.

In 1861, Ivan was accepted into the Kiev Theological Academy, where he studied history and literature, along with ancient and modern languages. In 1865, he graduated with a master's degree in Theology. He chose not to pursue a religious career, however, and instead, became a teacher. He taught Russian language, literature, history, and geography in the Poltava Theological Seminary (1865–1866) and, later, in different gymnasiums in Kalisz (1866-1867), Siedlce (1867-1872), and Chișinău (1873–1874).

He started writing in 1865. His works appeared in Kievan and Galician publishing houses and periodicals such as Rada, Pravda, Dilo, and Zoria magazines. His bibliography includes social and popular history novels, dramas, comedies, and fairy tales. Among his most famous works are the novel Kaidash's Family (1878) and the comedy At Kozhumyaky (1875), which was later remade into the play Chasing Two Hares by Mykhailo Starytsky. In 1961 the play was adapted as a popular comedy movie of the same name.

Nechuy-Levytsky assisted Panteleimon Kulish in creating the first full translation of the Bible into Ukrainian (Kulish's Bible), which was published in 1903 in Vienna. In 1917 together with bishop Alexis Dorodnitsyn he started translating into Ukrainian the Orthodox prayer book, aided by Maria Hrinchenko. However, the mention of his contribution was excluded from the printed version. During his last years, the author was financially supported by journalist and academic Serhiy Yefremov.

Ivan Nechuy-Levytsky died of starvation and illness on 2 April, 1918 in one of almshouses of Kyiv during the First World War. He was buried at the central alley of Baikove Cemetery. The funeral was paid for by the government of the Ukrainian People's Republic, with the memorial service in Saint Sophia Cathedral being presided by archbishop Nicodemus (Krotkov). Nechuy-Levytsky's funeral train was accompanied by officers and Cossacks of the Ukrainian People's Army, including Sich Riflemen.

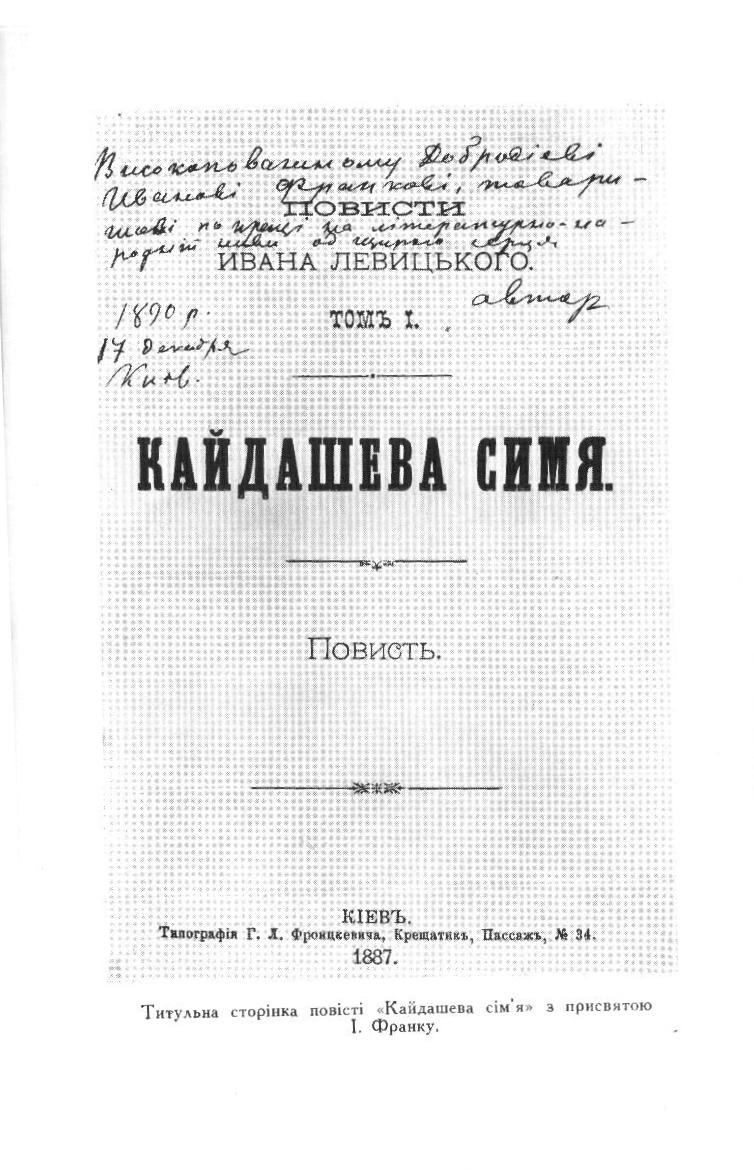
Novels by Ivan Levytsky. Volume 1. Kaidash's Family. – Kiev, 1887

== Bibliography ==
- 'Zhyttiepys' Ivana Levyts'koho (Nechuia), napysana nym samym,' S'vit, no. 7 (1888)
- Iefremov, Serhii. Nechui-Levyts'kyi (Kyiv 1924)
- Mezhenko, Iurii. 'Ivan Semenovych Nechui-Levyts'kyi,' Tvory, 1 (Kyiv 1926)
- Bilets'kyi, Oleksander. 'Ivan Semenovych Levyts'kyi (Nechui),' Tvory v chotyr'okh tomakh, 1 (Kyiv 1956)
- Pokhodzilo, M. Ivan Nechui-Levyts'kyi (Kyiv 1960)
- Krutikova, N. Tvorchist' I.S. Nechuia-Levyts'koho (Kyiv 1961)
- Ivanchenko, R. Ivan Nechui-Levyts'kyi: Narys zhyttia i tvorchosti (Kyiv 1980)
- Tarnawsky Maxim, The all-encompassing eye of Ukraine: Ivan Nechui-Levyts'kyi's realist prose, Toronto, University of Toronto Press, 2015, 384 pp., ISBN 9781442650084 (in English)

== Screen adaptations ==
- Kaidash's Family (1993–1996) — a 2-episode mini-series directed by Volodymyr Horodko for the Kozak Consortium.
- To Catch the Kaidash (2020) — a 12-episode television series based on Kaidash's Family novel, adapted by Natalka Vorozhbyt and produced by STB channel.
