= Peresopnytsia Gospel =

16th-century manuscript

Peresopnytsya Gospel
- Vernadsky National Library of Ukraine, Kyiv
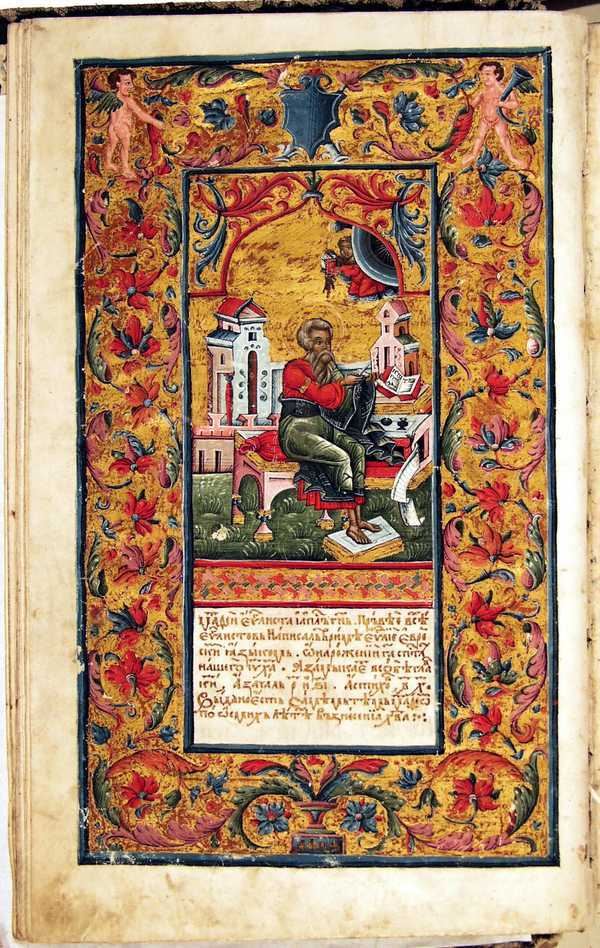
- Evangelist portrait of St Luke
- Also known as: Ukrainian: Пересопницьке Євангеліє
- Type: Gospel
- Date: 1556–1561
- Language: Ruthenian
- Scribe: Mykhailo Vasylovych
- Size: 380 by 240 millimetres (15.0 in × 9.4 in)
- Discovered: Osip Bodyansky (1830s)

The Peresopnytsia Gospel (Ukrainian: Пересопницьке Євангеліє, romanized: Peresopnytske Yevanheliie) is a 16th-century illuminated manuscript Gospel book written in the Ruthenian language. It is now in the Vernadsky National Library of Ukraine. Since 1991, all Ukrainian presidents have taken the oath of office on these gospels.

== History ==
It was made between 15 August 1556 and 29 August 1561 at the Bernardine Monastery, Iziaslav in the Grand Duchy of Lithuania, and the Monastery of the Mother of God in Peresopnytsia (now in Ukraine). The scribe was Mykhailo Vasylovych, the son of an archpriest from Sianik, who worked under the direction of Hryhorii, the archimandrite of the Peresopnytsia Monastery.

The Peresopnytsia Gospel contains the four Gospels of the New Testament. It is ornamented with Cyrillic (Note: The claim that these are Glagolitic characters is now widespread, but absent from academic literature. It traces back to the first version of this Wikipedia article. The editor responsible relayed the claim from the Dan's Topical Stamps website. The erroneous claim even made it into the Library of Congress description of a book on the manuscript by Aleksandr Sergeevič Gruzinskij, likely as a result of reliance on the Wikipedia article given the absence of such a claim in the book itself.) characters, which were influenced by the Italian Renaissance style. It is the first known example of a Ruthenian translation of the canonical text of the Scriptures.

The Gospel was commissioned by Anastasia Yuryivna Zaslavska, an Orthodox princess from Volyn, and her daughter and son-in-law Yevdokiya and Ivan Fedorovych Czartoryski.

After its completion, the book was kept in the Peresopnytsya Monastery. On 17 April 1701, it was presented to Pereyaslav Cathedral by Ivan Mazepa, the hetman of Ukraine. Scholar Osip Bodyansky discovered the book at the Pereyaslav Seminary and published a paper on the subject. Later on it was kept in the Poltava Seminary, Poltava Museum of History and Regional Studies, Kyiv Pechersk Lavra preserve. On 24 December 1948, it was placed at the Vernadsky National Library of Ukraine.

== Ukrainian presidential oath of office ==
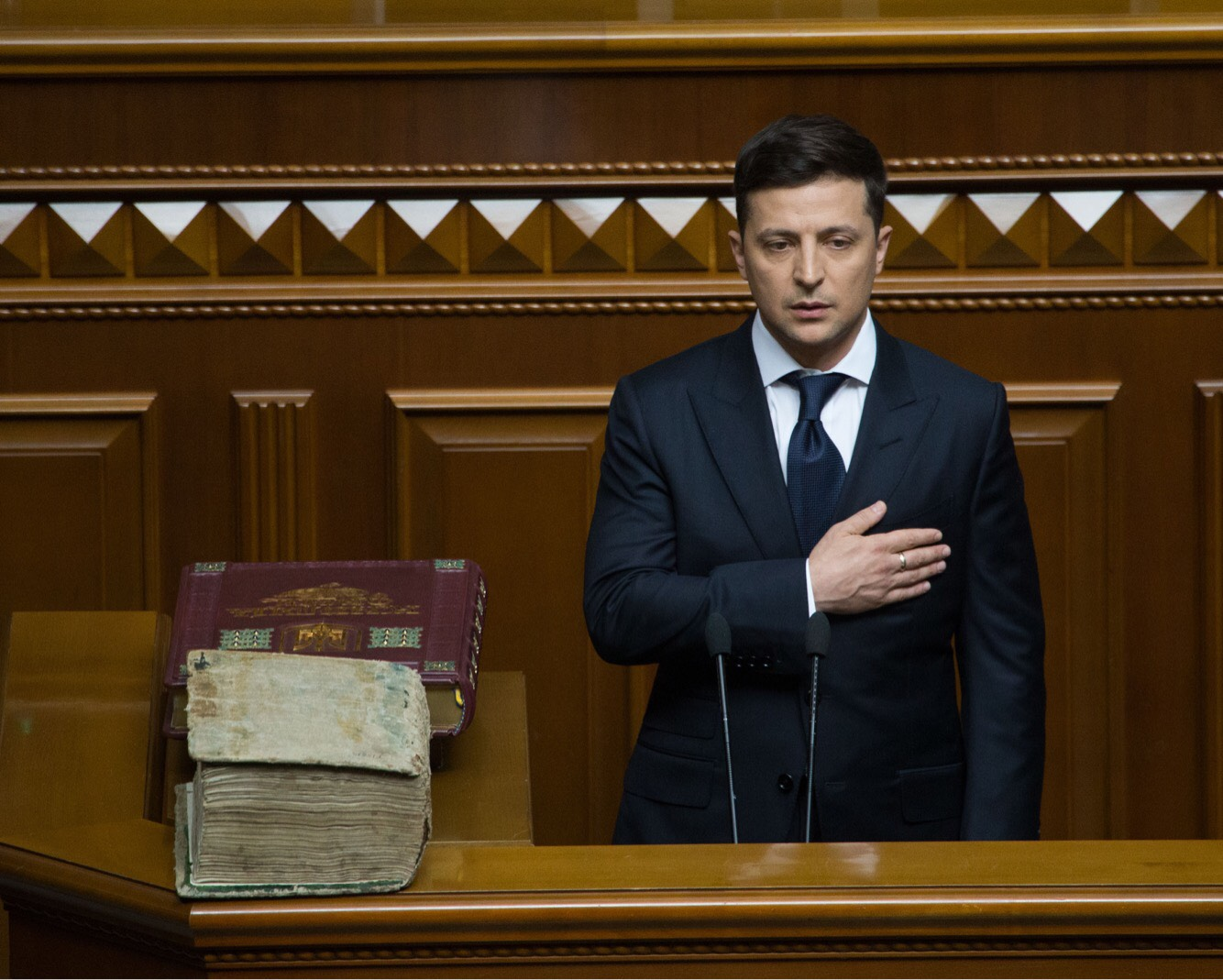
President of Ukraine Volodymyr Zelenskyy is inaugurated in 2019 with the Peresopnytsia Gospel

All six Ukrainian presidents since 1991 have taken the oath of office on the Gospel: Leonid Kravchuk (1991), Leonid Kuchma (1994), Viktor Yushchenko (2005), Viktor Yanukovych (2010), Petro Poroshenko (2014), and Volodymyr Zelenskyy (2019).

On 9 November 2010, on the Day of Ukrainian Writing and Language, ADEF-Ukraine publishing house (located in Kyiv) presented the Peresopnytske Evangelie edition. Origins and present. The book contains reduced facsimile copies of images of the original texts, the original text transliterated into the modern Ukrainian Cyrillic alphabet (with the addition of a little more than ten letters from the Church Slavonic Cyrillic alphabet) and a translation of the Peresopnytskyi Gospel into modern Ukrainian.

== See also ==
- Bible translations into Ukrainian
