= Ivan Buchko =

Ukrainian Greek Catholic bishop (1891–1974)

Archbishop Ivan Buchko
- Apostolic Visitator for the Ukrainians in the Western Europe
- Church: Ukrainian Greek Catholic Church
- In office: 28 July 1945 – 29 September 1971
- Predecessor: New creation
- Successor: Myroslav Marusyn

Orders
- Ordination: 21 February 1915 (Priest) by Lazar Mladenov
- Consecration: 20 October 1929 (Bishop) by Andrey Sheptytsky

Personal details
- Born: Ivan Buchko; 1 October 1891 Hermaniv, Austria-Hungary Empire
- Died: 21 September 1974 (aged 82) Rome, Italy

Ivan Buchko or Bučko (Ukrainian: Іван Бучко; 1 October 1891 – 21 September 1974) was a Ukrainian Greek Catholic hierarch in present-day Ukraine, United States and Italy. He was the auxiliary bishop of the Ukrainian Catholic Archeparchy of Lviv from 1929 to 1940, the auxiliary bishop of the Apostolic Exarchat in the United States for the Ukrainians from 1940 to 1945 and the first Apostolic Visitator for the Ukrainians in the Western Europe from 1945 to 1971. From 20 October 1929 as titular bishop of Cadi and from 27 April 1953 as titular archbishop of Leucas.

== Biography ==
Born in Hermaniv, Austria-Hungary Empire (present day – Tarasivka, Lviv Oblast, Ukraine) in the Ukrainian peasant family of Hryhoriy, who was a church cantor, and Horpyna in 1891. He was ordained a priest on 21 February 1915 by Bishop Lazar Mladenov for the Ukrainian Catholic Archeparchy of Lviv. He worked as a rector of the Greek-Catholic minor seminary in Lviv from 1922 to 1929.

He was appointed by the Holy See as auxiliary bishop of the Ukrainian Catholic Archeparchy of Lviv on 16 September 1929. He was consecrated to the Episcopate on 20 October 1929 in the church of Santi Sergio e Bacco in Rome. The principal consecrator was Metropolitan Andrey Sheptytsky, and the principal co-consecrators were Blessed Bishop Hryhory Khomyshyn and Blessed Bishop Josaphat Kotsylovsky. He was an Apostolic Visitator for the Ukrainians in Argentina and Brazil from 1939 to 1940 and for the Ukrainians in the Western Europe from 1945 to 1971. At the end of the Second World War, Buchko organized the escape of the entire Waffen-SS Galitsia Division to South and North America. Also with his blessing were hiding in the Ukrainian Pontifical College of Saint Josaphat in Rome from the Nazi persecution some members of the Italian resistance movement. Archbishop Buchko retired on 29 September 1971.

He participated in the Second Vatican Council as a Council Father in the 1960s. He died in Rome on 21 September 1974.

Catholic Church titles
New title	Titular Bishop of Cadi; 1929–1953	Succeeded by John Joseph Krol
Preceded by Alfonso Espino y Silva	Titular Archbishop of Leucas; 1953–1974	Succeeded by Vacant
New title	Apostolic Visitator for the Ukrainians in the Western Europe; 1945–1971	Succeeded by Myroslav Marusyn
