= Ukrainian national revival =

Social and political movement in Ukraine

The Ukrainian National Revival (Ukrainian: Українське національне відродження, romanized: Ukrainske natsionalne vidrodzhennia) took place during a period when the territory of modern Ukraine was divided between the Austrian Empire, the Kingdom of Hungary, and the Russian Empire after the partitions of Poland at the end of the 18th century. The period took place soon after the Haidamaka Uprisings (also known as Koliivshchyna) rocked lands of the former Cossack Hetmanate.

The movement arose at a time when the Ukrainian national resistance was almost entirely subjugated and largely driven underground. All state institutions under the Cossack Hetmanate were completely liquidated along with the Cossack movement. The European territory of the Russian Empire had successfully crossed the Dnieper and extended towards Central Europe, as well as reaching the shores of Black Sea.

Nonetheless, the period is also considered to be the beginning of modern Ukrainian literature, foremostly the works of Ivan Kotliarevsky. A number of Ukrainian historians such as Volodymyr Doroshenko and Mykhailo Hrushevsky divided the period into three stages. The first stage stretches from the end of the 18th century to the 1840s, the second stage covers the period of the 1840s–1850s, and the third stage is the second half of the 19th century.

== Beginnings (late 18th century–1840s) ==
=== In the Russian Empire ===
After the liquidation of the Cossack Hetmanate, autonomist ideas retained their popularity among the Ukrainian political elite. This fact is demonstrated by the 1791 secret mission of Vasily Kapnist to Berlin, during which a plan of Prussian support for the separation of Ukraine from the Russian Empire was discussed. The failure of that mission forced members of the Ukrainian elite to emphasize cultural rather than political goals, and that process resulted in the emergence of modern Ukrainian literature with the publication of Ivan Kotliarevsky's Eneida in 1798.

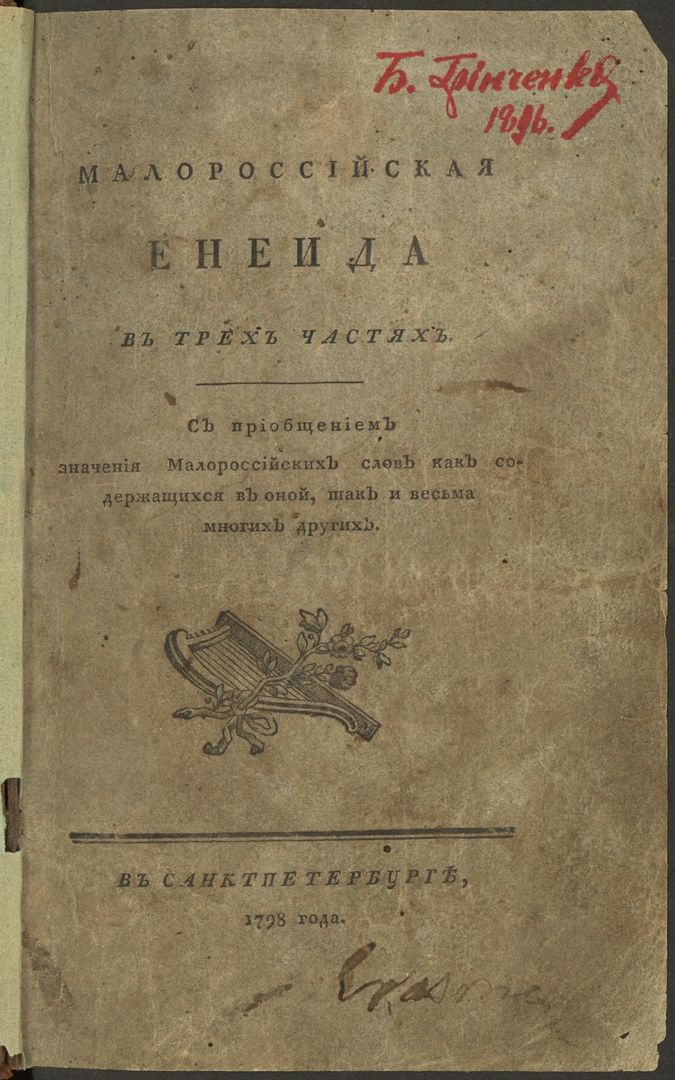
First edition of Eneida, 1798

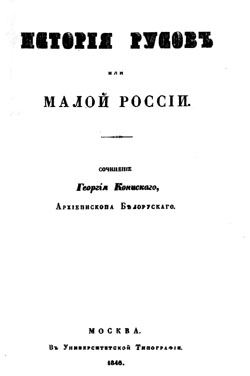
An 1846 issue of the History of the Ruthenians, attributed to George Konysky

Prior to the French invasion of Russia in 1812, a circle of Ukrainian patriotic activists was active in Novhorod-Siverskyi. Among its members were Andriy Hudovych, Tymofiy Kalynsky, Ivan Khalansky, Arkhyp Khudorba, Pavlo Koropchevsky, Opanas Lobysevych, Mykhailo Myklashevsky, Hryhoriy Poletyka, Andriy Rachynsky, Bishop Varlaam Shyshatsky, Fedir Tumansky, Melkhysedek Znachko-Yavorsky, H. Dolynsky, S. Shyrai, and A. Pryhara. The circle played a key role in the revival of Cossack regiments, and its members voiced support for the political rights of Ukrainian nobility along with activists such as Adrian Chepa and Vasyl Poletyka. During the early 19th century, History of the Ruthenians was created, promoting the cause of Ukrainian autonomy.

During the early decades of the 19th century, a major centre of Ukrainian culture emerged in Kharkiv, where a university was established in 1805 thanks to the work of Vasyl Karazin and members of Sloboda Ukraine's nobility and merchants. A group of authors and cultural activists emerged at the university, including figures such as Hryhorii Kvitka-Osnovianenko, Petro Hulak-Artemovsky, Levko Borovykovsky, Izmail Sreznevsky, Amvrosy Metlinsky and Mykola Kostomarov. Several magazines dedicated to Ukrainian topics were published in Kharkiv during that period.

The rise of Napoleon encouraged some members of Ukrainian intelligentsia to see him as a potential liberator of their land from Russian rule. However, following the French invasion of 1812, the majority of Ukrainian elite remained loyal to the tsarist government. According to the order of central authorities, Little Russian governor-general Lobanov-Rostovsky started the recruitment of Cossack regiments, which was met with great enthusiasm. In total, 15 regiments were established and equipped with the support of Ukraine's Cossack population. It was initially promised, that the regiments would remain functioning on a constant basis following the end of the war, however in the aftermath they were incorporated into the regular army.

Following the end of Napoleonic Wars, the regime of emperor Alexander I was becoming increasingly reactionary, and its policies caused great dissatisfaction among many Ukrainians. A notable event during that period was the uprising in Chuhuiv, directed against the government policy of establishing military settlements. Popular dissatisfaction with the governing regime among the elite also resulted in the rise of Freemasonry in Ukrainian lands, with the most prominent lodges being established in Kyiv and Poltava. During the early 1820s, two secret organizations of imperial army officers emerged in Ukraine: Southern Society of the Decembrists and Union of United Slavs. Members of both groups opposed tsarist autocracy and promoted the abolition of social estates, but mostly neglected the national question.

In December 1825 soldiers of the Chernigov Regiment, led by Sergey Muravyov-Apostol, a descendant of hetman Danylo Apostol, rose in revolt in the town of Vasylkiv and attempted to march on Kyiv in order to spread the uprising across the whole country. However, the uprising was swiftly suppressed, with its leaders being executed, and many of its participants, including many Ukrainian nobles, exiled to Siberia. In the aftermath, participants of the revolt became known as Decembrists. The government crackdown also spread on other secret societies in Ukraine, leading to arrests of their members.

During the 1830 Polish uprising, which also engulfed parts of Right-bank Ukraine, Russian authorities once again resorted to recruitment of Cossacks, forming a total of 8 regiments, which following the suppression of the revolt in 1831 were incorporated into the regular army, with some units being transferred to the Caucasus. Russificatory policies of Russian authorities became especially harsh under the rule of Nicholas I, which saw increasing censorship, liquidation of the Greek Catholic Church, abolition of Magdeburg Law and replacement of the Statutes of Lithuania in Ukrainian lands with imperial law.

=== In the Habsburg Empire ===
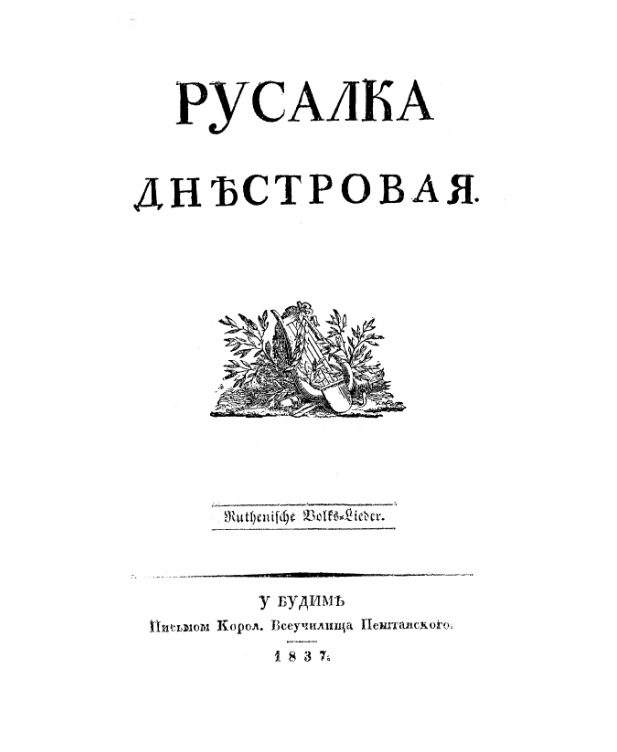
Cover of Rusalka Dnistrovaya, 1837

Galicia became something of a "Ukrainian Piedmont" under Austrian rule. During the first decades of Habsburg rule (1770s–1780s), Austrian officials recognized the existence of the Ruthenian people, introduced a system of universal elementary education to be taught in the vernacular Ruthenian language, and recognized the Eastern Rite Uniate Catholic Church, to which the overwhelming majority of the Ruthenian populace in Austrian-ruled Galicia belonged, as an equal to the Western Rite Roman Catholic Church.

During the 1820s and 1830s, a circle of scholars and priests emerged around the Peremyshl bishop Ivan Snihurskyi, promoting the organization of popular schools and publishing of educational literature. This was typical for Galicia, where the local clergy played a leading role in social and cultural development. At the same time, conservatism of the clerics contributed to the preservation of Church Slavonic as the main literary tongue, and stunted the development of literature in the language of the common folk. The situation changed under the influence of Western ideas of Romanticism, democracy and liberalism. The start of Ukrainian national revival in what is today Western Ukraine is traditionally connected with the activities of "Ruthenian Triad", whose participants Markiyan Shashkevych, Ivan Vahylevych, and Yakiv Holovatsky published in 1837 the Rusalka Dnistrovaya, an almanac of Ukrainian folk songs in Buda, Hungary.

== Early political movements (1840s–1860s) ==
=== In the Russian Empire ===
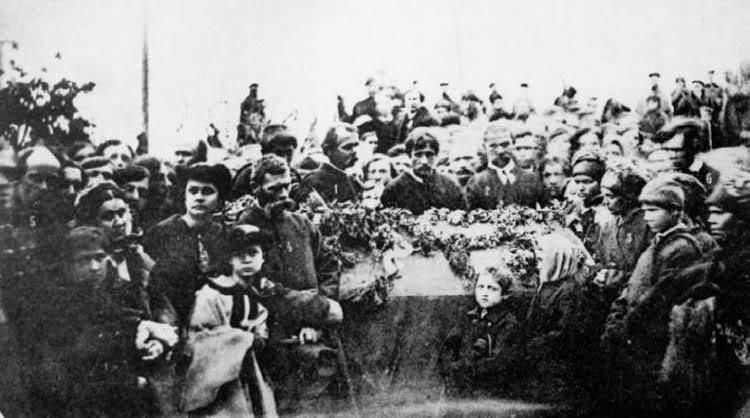
People attending the funeral procession of Taras Shevchenko in Kyiv, May 1861

A new generation of Ukrainian activists emerged during that period, first among ethnic Ukrainians living or studying in Saint-Petersburg, and later in Ukraine proper. Inspired by Western Romanticism and visions of Ukrainian past contained in the works of Hohol, this generation found its most important representative in the figure of Taras Shevchenko. After settling in Kyiv, Shevchenko became an associate of a group of Ukrainian activists, who formed the underground Brotherhood of Sts Cyril and Methodius. Its members promoted the ideas of republicanism and Pan-Slavism, envisioning the creation of a free Ukrainian republic in a federal union with other Slavic nations. The society's program was formulated in the Books of the Genesis of the Ukrainian People written by Mykola Kostomarov. After only one year of existence, in 1847 the Brotherhood was disbanded by authorities, with its members being arrested and sentenced to exile.

Following the Russian defeat in Crimean War and start of liberal reforms by Alexander II, former members of the Brotherhood of Sts Cyril and Methodius were able to return from exile and contributed to the revival of Ukrainian cultural life. That process was initially centered in Saint Petersburg, where the Osnova magazine was published in 1861-1862. The magazine's editors made an emphasis on cultural work and opposition to Russian and Polish claims against Ukrainians. A network of Ukrainian hromada communities emerged, first in Saint Petersburg, where its notable members invcluded Volodymyr Leontovych and Petro Stebnytsky, and later around Ukraine.

During that period Ukrainian cultural life benefitted from the emergence of new publications, establishment of Sunday schools and organization of Ukrainian concerts and performances. A notable phenomenon of the Ukrainian national movement during the mid-19th century was Khlopomanstvo, which involved members of Polonized nobility in Right-bank Ukraine. Led by figures such as Volodymyr Antonovych, Tadey Rylsky and Borys Poznansky, members of that movement promoted the studies of Ukrainian history, folklore and language, and opposed Polish claims on Ukrainian territories.

=== In the Habsburg Empire ===
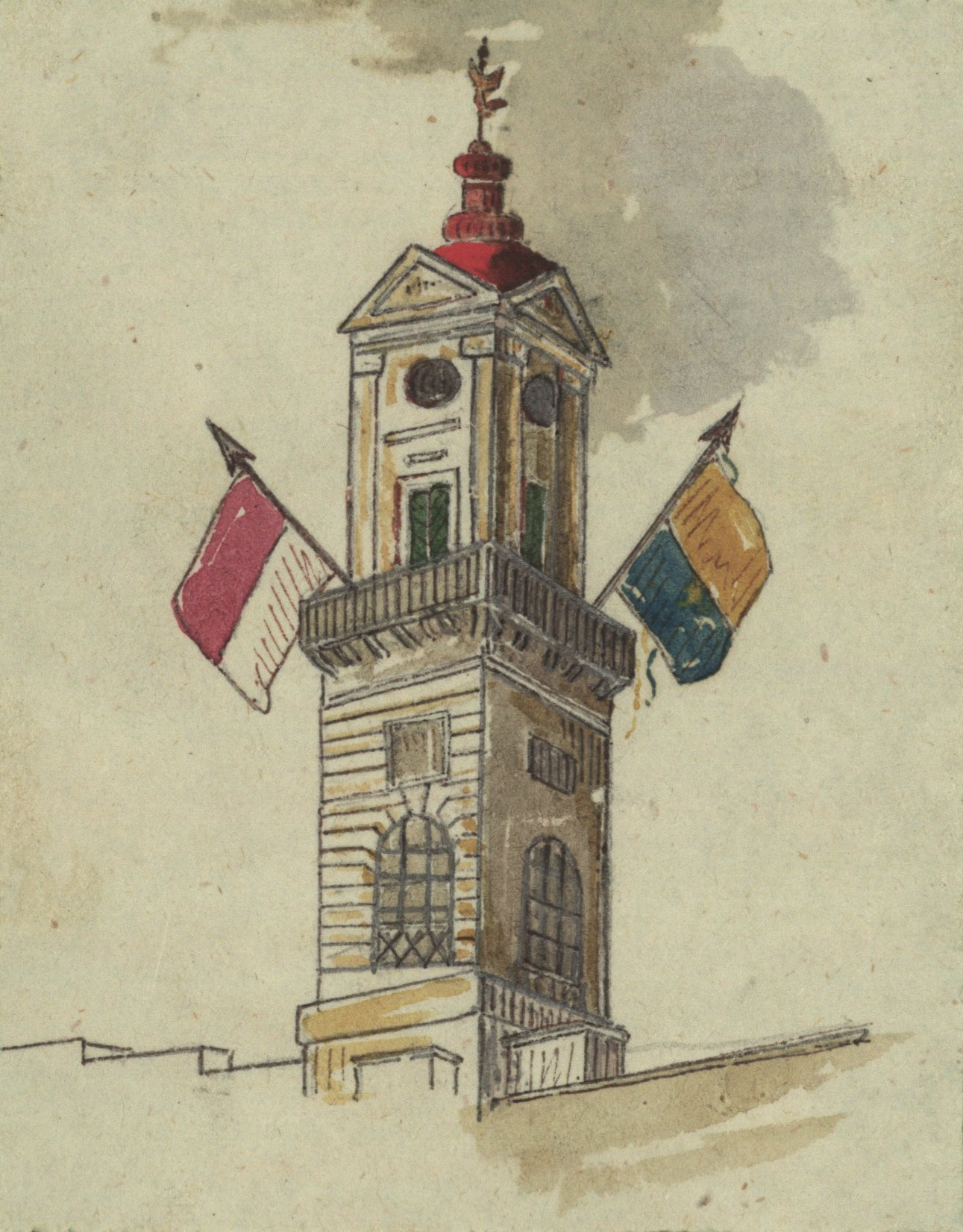
Polish white-red and Ruthenian blue-yellow flags hoisted on the Lviv Town Hall during the Revolutions of 1848

During the Revolution of 1848, the Supreme Ruthenian Council was founded in Lviv, becoming the first legal Ukrainian political organization. Headed by bishop Hryhoriy Yakhymovych, its manifesto proclaimed Galician Ruthenians to be a part of a distinct Ukrainian people. The council's members promoted the separation of Galicia into two administrative parts based on the dominant ethnicity; additionally, they supported the unification of Eastern Galicia with Transcarpathia. In order to oppose Polish claims on the whole region, the Supreme Ruthenian Council allied itself with Austrian authorities, and popular militias established with the support of its members took part in suppression of the Hungarian Revolution of 1848. Despite this, the plans to divide Galicia into autonomous Polish and Ruthenian parts failed to gain support in Vienna.

Along with politics, the Supreme Ruthenian Council also engaged in the organization of cultural life. With its support, Ruthenian representatives took part in the Panslavic Congress in Prague, a congress of Ruthenian scientists was organized in Lviv, a Ruthenian literary-scientific organization (matica) was established, and a chair of Ruthenian language and literature was founded at Lviv University. In May 1848, Zoria Halytska started publishing as the first newspaper in Ukrainian language. According to an Austrian governmental decree from 1854, a separate judicial district was established in Lviv, encompassing the eastern part of Galicia and allowing the usage of Ruthenian/Ukrainian in court proceedings in that area. Following the government crackdown against revolutionaries, the Supreme Ruthenian Council was forced to disband, and political power in Galicia was de-facto monopolized by Poles under the leadership of Agenor Romuald Gołuchowski. Attempts of Austrian authorities to introduce Latin alphabet among Galician Ukrainians resulted in the so-called Alphabet War, meanwhile Russian propaganda spread under the supervision of Mikhail Pogodin led to the emergence of a Moscophile movement in the region.

In Bukovina, local Hutsul peasants rose up under the leadership of Lukian Kobylytsia, an elected member of the Imperial Council, but were suppressed with force. In 1849, with support of the local Romanian landowners and Orthodox bishop Eugene Hackmann, Bukovina received the status of a separate crown land. In Transcarpathia, Adolf Dobriansky promoted the idea of administrative separation between Hungarian and Ruthenian areas, and in 1849 was appointed viceroy of a separate Ruthenian district established by emperor Franz Joseph I. This contributed to the development of culture and education among local Ruthenians. However, after 1860 the Ruthenian autonomy in the region was abolished by Hungarian authorities, and in 1867 Dobriansky was forced into exile due to accusations of Moscophilia. As a result, Transcarpathia underwent a period of Magyarization and lost most of its contacts with Galicia and other Ukrainian lands.

== Repression and new resurgence (1860s–1890s) ==
=== Russian Empire ===
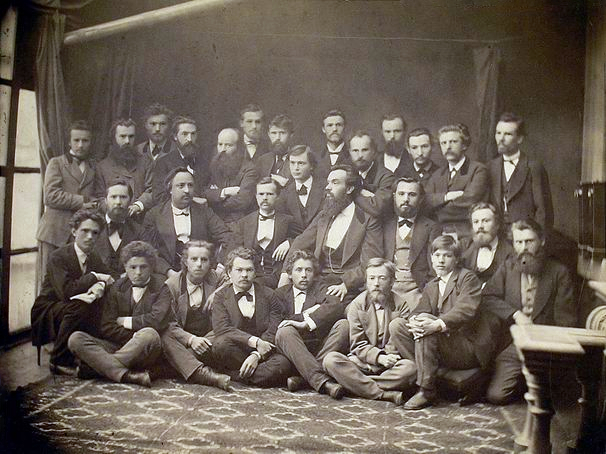
Members of the Kyiv Old Hromada in 1874

As a result of a new wave of government repressions following the 1863 Polish uprising, a new crackdown against Ukrainian culture started with the support of Russian reactionary circles, resulting in the adoption of Valuyev Circular, which outlawed publishing of educational material in Ukrainian. Sunday schools were closed down, a new campaign against Ukrainian publications started, and several notable members of intelligentsia, including Pavlo Chubynsky, Oleksandr Konysky and Petro Yefymenko, were sentenced to exile.

During the 1870s, the most influential centre of the Ukrainian national movement emerged in Kyiv under the leadership of the "Old Hromada". Among its notable members were Volodymyr Antonovych, Mykhailo Drahomanov, Mykola Lysenko, Pavlo Chubynsky, Pavlo Zhytetsky and many others. The organization initially concentrated itself on educational work and spread of Ukrainian national ideas among the masses, but with time adopted a political program. Kyiv Hromada established close ties with fellow Ukrainian organizations in cities such as Kharkiv, Poltava, Chernihiv and Odesa. In 1872 its members contributed to the foundation of the Southwestern Department of Russian Geographic Society, and in 1875 established Kievsky Telegraf newspaper as their press organ.

In 1873 a circle of socialists-federalists was established by Ukrainian students in Saint Petersburg, promoting the transformation of the Russian Empire into a federal entity with autonomous democratically governed subjects. The new rise of the Ukrainian national movement alarmed the authorities, and in 1876 Alexander II issued the Ems Decree, outlawing most printed publications in the Ukrainian language. Additionally, the government closed down the Southwestern Department of the Russian Geographic Society and the Kievsky Telegraf newspaper, and removed several Ukrainian professors, including Mykhailo Drahomanov and Mykola Ziber, from Kyiv University. As a result of the new crackdown, Ukrainian authors were forced to move their publishing activities to Austrian-ruled Galicia.

Revolutionaries of Ukrainian origin were present in the Russian narodnik movement, in particular among the members of People's Will. Despite increasing reaction under the rule of Alexander III, the Ukrainian natinal movement continued its activities in the cultural sphere. During the 1880s, Ukrainian studies were promoted by members of Kyiv Hromada on the pages of Kievskaya Starina magazine, and Ukrainian theatre developed thanks to the contribution of Mykhailo Starytsky, Marko Kropyvnytsky and Tobilevych brothers (Ivan Karpenko-Kary, Panas Saksahansky and Mykola Sadovsky). A major role in promotion of the Ukrainian national cause was played by émigré publications of Mykhailo Drahomanov and Serhiy Podolynsky.

=== Habsburg Empire and Austria-Hungary ===
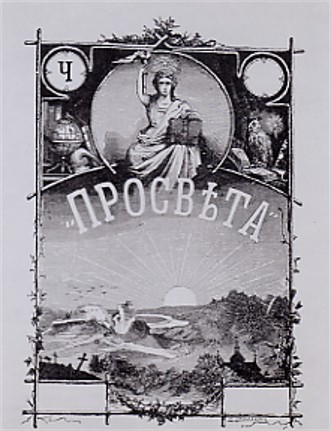
An early publication of the Prosvita society

Following the proclamation of the new Austrian Constitution in 1861, Galicia received its autonomy and right to convene a local parliament. However, with the simultaneous introduction of curia system, Ukrainian representatives were a minority in that organ compared to Poles, many of whom benefitted from the status of major landowners. This fact forced Ukrainian representatives in Vienna parliament to support the Austrian government and abandon their previous project of Galicia's partition. The situation was exacerbated by the Austro-Hungarian Compromise of 1867, which involved the establishment of Poles as dominant group in Galicia's politics and introduction of Polish as the language of regional government. This resulted in rapid Polonization of education and general urban life in the area.

Ukrainian national movement in the Habsburg Empire saw a new resurgence during the 1860s, with the emergence of the Ukrainophile Narodovtsi ("Populists") movement. Its members opposed both the Polish elite and Moscophiles, orienting themselves on the ideas of Taras Shevchenko and establishing close ties with the intelligentsia of Dnieper Ukraine. Opposing the use of Church Slavonic and Yazychie, Narodovtsi published their press in the Ukrainian vernacular, and after the Tsarist crackdown against Ukrainian literature supported the publication of works by authors from Russian-ruled Ukraine in Galicia. An important role in the movement's development was played by Mykhailo Drahomanov, whose ideas resonated with the younger generation of Galician activists.

The new wave of the Ukrainian national movement enjoyed support from Galician students, who organized themselves in communities based on examples from Dnieper Ukraine. In 1861 the first Ukrainian national theatre was established in Lviv, and in 1868 the Prosvita educational society was founded. During the next decade, Narodovtsi along with members of the local clergy continued their organizational efforts and promoted civic initiatives among the peasantry and urban population. In 1873 the Shevchenko Scientific Society was established in Lviv through cooperation of activists from Dnieper Ukraine and Galicia.

Following the 1879 Imperial Council election, which ended with disastrous results for the conservative Ruthenian Council, Narodovtsi entered the political arena, starting the publication of their own press organs, most notably the Dilo newspaper, established in 1880. The movement adopted ideas of organic work, and in 1885 established the Narodna Rada ("People's Council") organization, which promoted liberal, democratic and progressive ideas and once again issued the demand to partition Galicia between Ukrainians and Poles. During the 1890s Narodovtsi movement increased its activity with the arrival of a new generation of activists, such as Kost Levytsky and Mykhailo Hrushevsky, into its rows. As a result of the "New Era" agreement negotiated by Ukrainian representatives with viceroy Kasimir Badeni in 1890, a chair of Ukrainian history was established at Lviv University.

In Bukovina a Ukrainian cultural revival started during the 1860s as a result of influences from Dnieper Ukraine and Galicia. Initially reluctant to participate in politics, during the 1880s local acitivsts adopted a national program influenced by the Galician Narodovtsi movement. In 1885 the periodical Bukovyna was launched by Yuriy Fedkovych. An important role in the growth of Ukrainian national consciousness in the region was played by Stepan Smal-Stotsky, who taught as professor at the University of Czernowitz.

== Rise of the political movement (1890s–1914) ==
=== Russian Empire ===
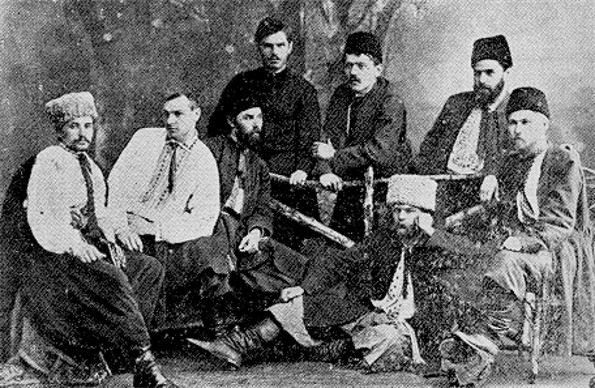
Members of Taras Brotherhood in Kharkiv

In 1892 the Taras Brotherhood was founded by Borys Hrinchenko, Ivan Lypa and Mykola Mikhnovsky with the aim of protecting Ukrainians' social and cultural rights and establishing an autonomous Ukrainian state. In 1897 the Ukrainian Nonpartisan Democratic Organization was established in Kyiv. In 1900 the Revolutionary Ukrainian Party was founded as the first Ukrainian revolutionary political movement; in 1905 it would reform itself into the Ukrainian Social Democratic Labour Party. Other left-wing Ukrainian political forces which emerged during the early 20th century were the Spilka and the Ukrainian Socialist-Revolutionary Party.

During the first years of the 20th century a movement for the permission of Ukrainian education started with the support of local zemstvo organs and city dumas in a number of regions. In 1903 the installation of a monument to Ivan Kotliarevsky in Poltava became an important manifestation of Ukrainian unity, attracting guests from Galicia and Bukovina. The Russian Revolution of 1905 led to the relaxation of bans against Ukrainian printing and education, contributing to the development of press and return of Ukrainian studies to universities. In 1908 the Ukrainian Scientific Society was established in Kyiv. Over 40 Ukrainian representatives were elected to the State Duma of the Russian Empire in 1906, promoting the cause of Ukrainian autonomy.

After the Coup of June 1907, a new crackdown started against Ukrainian cultural and political life, with the government closing Prosvita societies, banning Ukrainian-language lectures and shutting down press publications. Even celebrations of Taras Shevchenko's birthday were outlawed by Russian authorities. The government supported the activities of reactionary nationalist organizations, such as the Union of the Russian People as a way to suppress the Ukrainian national movement. In order to oppose these policies, the Union of Ukrainian Progressivists was established in 1908 by Mykhailo Hrushevsky, Yevhen Chykalenko and Serhiy Yefremov. Promoting Ukrainian autonomy and constitutional parliamentarianism, its members condemned Russian imperialism and centralism. This kind of national resistance contributed to the fact that the "Ukrainian question" became one of the central topics discussed in the State Duma during the 1910s.

=== Austria-Hungary ===
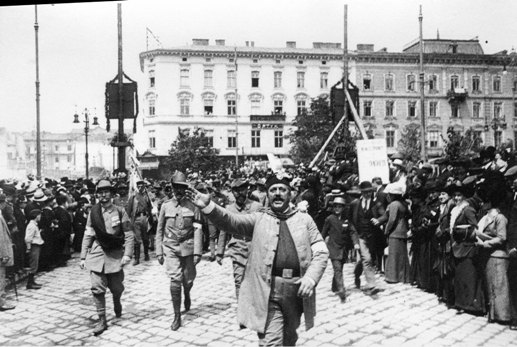
Parade of the Ukrainian Sokil society in Lviv, 1914

In 1890 Ukrainian Radical Party, the first Ukrainian political party, was established by Ivan Franko and Mykhailo Pavlyk under the influence of Mykhailo Drahomanov's ideas. In 1895 the party's member Yulian Bachynsky issued the pamphlet Ukraina Irredenta, which for the first time openly voiced the idea of an independent Ukrainian nation state. In 1898 this idea was publicly supported during a manifestation of Ukrainian students at Lviv's High Castle led by Lonhyn Tsehelsky. In 1899, the right wing of Narodovtsi separated, establishing the Ukrainian National Democratic Party, and during the next year its leadership officially proclaimed Ukrainian independence to be part of their maximum programme. Meanwhile the left wing of the radical movement organized itself into the Ukrainian Social Democratic Party.

In Bukovina the turn of the 20th century saw the emergence of a Ukrainian fraction in the local legislature, headed by Stepan Smal-Stotsky and Mykola Vasylko. Their group worked against Moscophile propaganda and promoted the separation of local church organization between Ukrainians and Romanians. Bukovinian Narodovtsi opposed the traditional Romanian boyar elite and clergy, cooperating with Romanian democrats, Jews and Germans. Their political program envisioned future unification with Galicia, Podolia and Volhynia under the rule of Habsburg dynasty. Along with narodovtsi, a radical movement emerged among Bukovinian Ukrainians. In addition, an oppositional social democratic movement arose under the leadership of Yosyp Bezpalko. At the same time, German language and culture continued to dominate the region, with the local administration headed by ethnic Germans. Austrian authorities were concerned with the growth of the Ukrainian national movement in Bukovina and adopted various measures in order to weaken it.

During the early 20th century an important role in the Ukrainian national movement in Galicia was played by the Ukrainian Greek Catholic Church, whose metropolitan Andrey Sheptytsky adopted populist and Ukrainophile positions. That period saw the growth in Ukrainian civic activity and was accompanied by protests of Galician parliamentarians and students against the chauvinism of Polish-dominated local authorities and social oppression. In 1902 a major peasant strike engulfed the region, with its participants demanding a rise in wages and removal of hurdles for emigration of labourers to Germany and North America. Following the 1907 Cisleithanian legislative election, a Ukrainian Club was formed by deputies from Galicia and Bukovina in the Imperial Council. However, local elections in Galicia continued to be dominated by an alliance of Poles and Moscophiles, and tensions during the campaign resulted in the assassination of viceroy Andrzej Kazimierz Potocki by a Ukrainian student in 1908. In 1910 conflicts over the status of Lviv University culminated in deadly clashes between Polish and Ukrainian students of the establishment.

In order to decrease the tensions, starting from 1912 Austrian authorities worked to reach a compromise between Poles and Ukrainians in Galicia. Amid worsening relations between Austria-Hungary and the Russian Empire, in 1913 new elections to the regional parliament resulted in a decisive defeat of Moscophiles. In early 1914 a new electoral statute was adopted, increasing the role of peasants in the voting process. By the start of the First World War, Galician Ukrainians had developed a dense network of popular schools and reading halls, and supported numerous sporting organizations (Sich, Sokil), cooperatives, insurance groups and banks.

== See also ==
- Chronology of Ukrainian language suppression
- Derussianization
  - Demolition of monuments to Alexander Pushkin in Ukraine
  - Demolition of monuments to Vladimir Lenin in Ukraine
  - Russification and Derussification in Ukraine
- Decommunization
  - Decommunization in Russia
  - Decommunization in Ukraine
    - List of communist monuments in Ukraine
    - List of Ukrainian toponyms that were changed as part of decommunization in 2016
    - Ukrainian decommunization laws
- Language policy in Ukraine
  - Reversal of Ukrainization policies in Soviet Ukraine
  - Ukrainian orthography of 1928
- Lustration in Ukraine
- People's Friendship Arch, colloquial name "Yarmo" (Yoke)
- Polonization
- Poles in Ukraine
- Magyarization
- Russians in Ukraine
  - Russian language in Ukraine
- Ukrainian nationalism
  - Law of Ukraine "On supporting the functioning of the Ukrainian language as the State language"
  - Ukrainian War of Independence (1917–1921)
  - Ukrainization
  - Ukrainophilia
- Volhynian Genocide
