= Hanna Barvinok =

Ukrainian writer and folklorist

- Ганна Барвінок
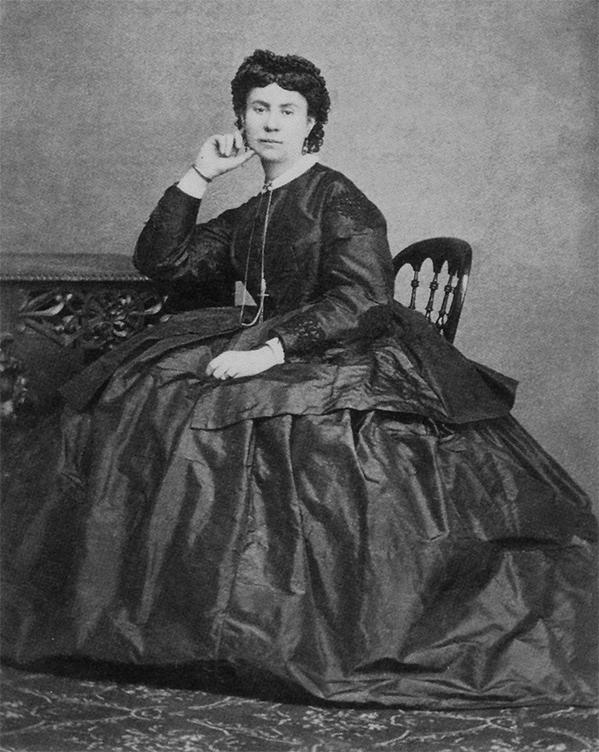
- Barvinok in 1866
- Born: Oleksandra Mikhailovna Bilozerska; 5 May 1828; Chernigov Governorate, Russian Empire (now Borzna, Chernihiv Oblast, Ukraine)
- Died: 6 July 1911 (aged 83); Motronivka
- Occupations: Writer; folklorist
- Spouse: Panteleimon Kulish
- Relatives: Vasyl Bilozersky (brother); Mykola Bilozersky (brother)

Oleksandra Mikhailovna Bilozerska-Kulish (Ukrainian: Олександра Михайлівна Білозерська-Куліш; Russian: Алекса́ндра Миха́йловна Белозе́рская-Кули́ш; 5 May 1828 – 6 July 1911), who commonly wrote under the pseudonym Hanna Barvinok, was a Ukrainian writer and folklorist. Considered one of the most important writers in Ukraine, she was the first female writer of modern Ukrainian literature and became a pioneer of ethnographic realism in Ukrainian writing.

In addition to her better-known pseudonym of Hanna Barvinok, she also wrote under the name A. Nečuj-Viter. She was married to the writer Panteleimon Kulish and was the sister of Vasyl and Mykola Bilozersky.

== Biography ==
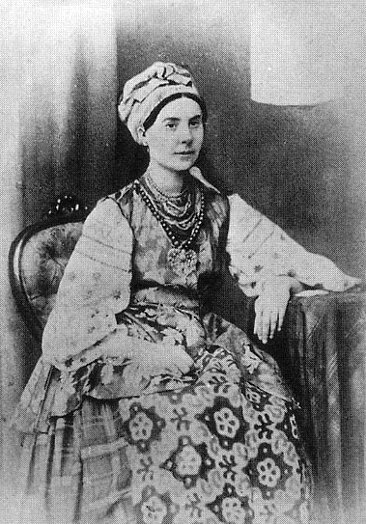
Hanna Barvinok in 1847

Barvinok was born on 5 May 1828 as Oleksandra Mykhailivna Bilozerska in the Chernigov Governorate, an administrative subdivision of the Left-bank Ukraine in the Russian Empire (now part of Borzna in the Chernihiv Oblast of Ukraine). While she was young, the city had frequent fires, which eventually caused their family home to burn down. After the fire, she and her family moved to a nearby hamlet in Motronivka.

Barvinok's family owned land in Motronivka. Her father was Mikhail (or Mykhail) Bilozersky, a Marshal of Nobility for the local area. He had a reputation for being a freethinker and was interested in modern Ukrainian literature. Barvinok's mother was Paraska Hryhorivna Kostenetska, the daughter of a Cossack soldier. Her mother was interested in traditional Ukrainian customs and songs.

Barvinok had brothers named Vasyl and Mykola, and sisters named Lyuba and Nadiya, who all grew up to become prominent figures in Ukraine. Her brother Vasyl became a Ukrainian public and literary figure. Her other brother, Mykola, became a folklorist and ethnographer. Her sister Lyuba was the muse and lover of the poet, Victor Zabila, and her sister Nadiya later became the mother of writer Nadiia Kybalchych.

Oleksandra and her sisters studied at private boarding schools, which she attended from 1834 to 1842.

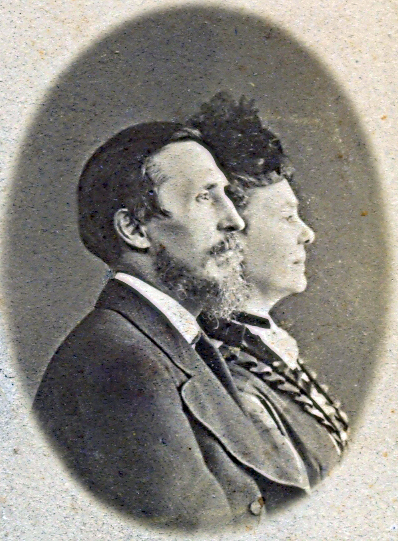
Hanna Barvinok with her husband, 1877

At the age of 15, Barvinok met the writer Panteleimon Kulish in Motronivka, when he was invited there by her brother Vasyl. Four years later, on 24 January 1847, Panteleimon and Barvinok married.

The newly married couple traveled to Warsaw. About four months after their marriage, the Brotherhood of Saints Cyril and Methodius was broken up and her husband was arrested and sent to Saint Petersburg. He was tried for his writing of The Tale of the Ukrainian People.

After the arrest of her husband, Panteleimon Kulish, she suffered a miscarriage and became unable to have children again. She then moved to Tula, following her exiled husband. From 1854 onward, after their exile ended, Barvinok and her husband lived in Saint Petersburg. In 1883, the Kulishs settled back in Motronivka.

When the manuscript of the Ukrainian translation of the Bible, which Kulish had been working on for 25 years, burned, she persuaded him to start working again.

After her husband's death, Barvinok organized and memorialized Panteleimon's literary creations. She published his writings and compiled a multi-volume series of all of his life's works, although only five of the planned 22 volumes were ever published. She also established the Panteleimon Kulish Museum in his memory.

Barvinok died on 6 July 1911, aged 83, in Motronivka. She was buried next to her husband at their former farm in the town.

== Writing ==
Barvinok wrote more than 30 stories during her lifetime, the main characters of which were mostly women. She began as a prose writer and mainly wrote about folk life, specifically among families and peasants, and was particularly drawn to the "fate of the peasant woman".

She was the founder and leader of ethnographic realism in Ukrainian literature, and based her writing off of her personal ethnographic notes. While recording her observations on a trip to Warsaw, she began collecting materials for her initial works.

Barvinok began writing stories in the 1840s, with her first work titled The Jewish Serf. Her works began to be published in 1858, under a pseudonym chosen by her husband: Hanna Barvinok.

In her literary works, Barvinok's attentions were also focused on the problems of family and domestic relations, including family tyranny (House Disaster, 1861), the joyless fate of being with a drunken man (Women's Poverty, 1887), and the drama of forced marriage (Father's Mistake, 1902). The writer also created figures of strong-willed women (Victory, 1887; Youth Struggle, 1902).

Her language was colorful, figurative, and full of folk proverbs. Some of her more figurative stories were "Mermaid", "Flower with tears, tears with flowers", "Disaster is not without good", "Autumn summer". Using Chernihiv and Poltava dialects, as well as knowledge of rural customs and folklore, she wrote the drama "Mother's Revenge".

Barvinok's works appeared in the almanacs Khata and First Wreath, as well as the journals Osnova, Pravda, and the Literaturno-naukovyi vistynk, among others. Her writings were published in multiple collections and anthologies, including posthumous publications. Ukrainian writer Borys Hrinchenko praised her work, calling Barvinok "the poet of women's fate."

== Legacy ==
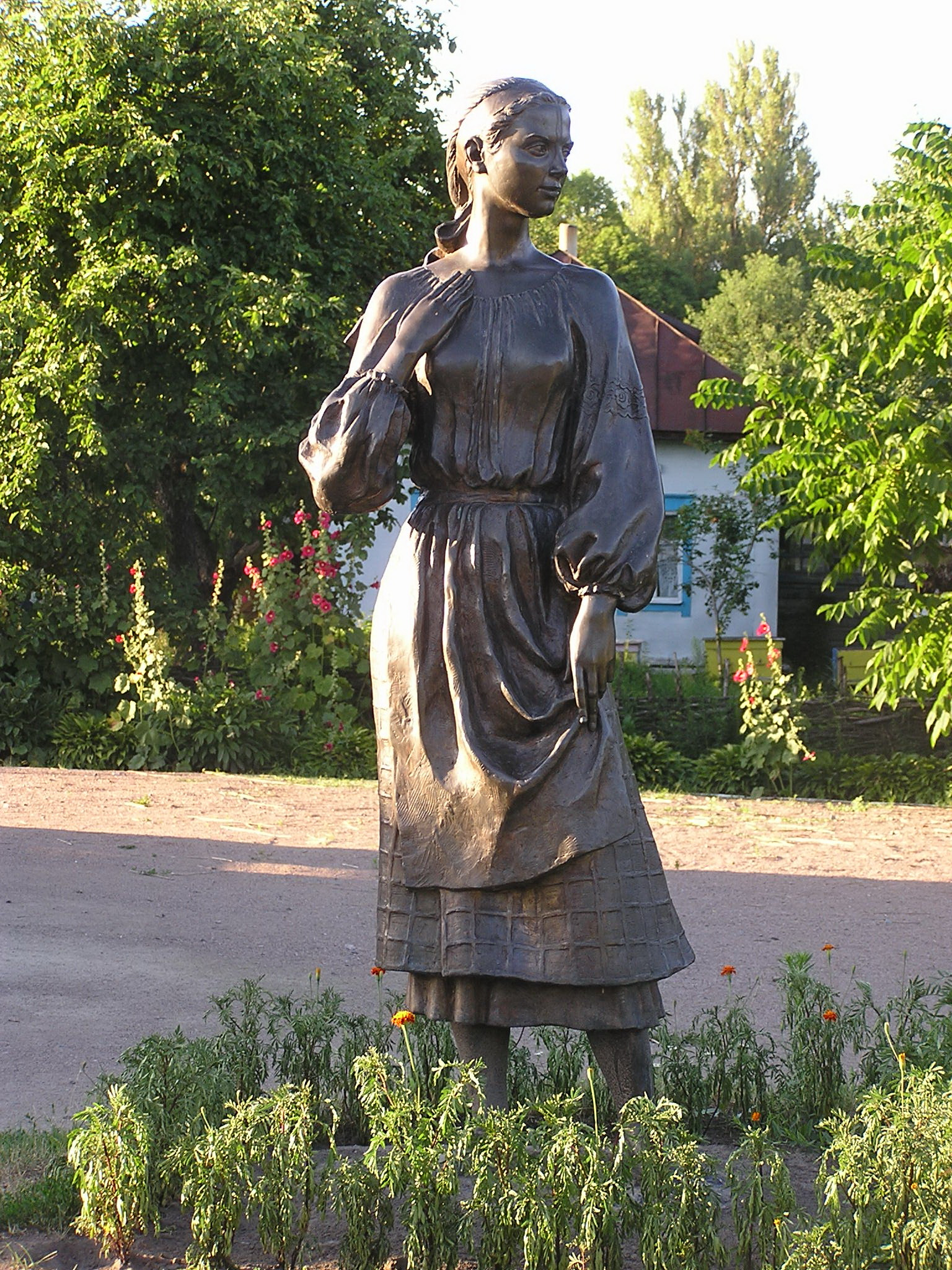
Statue of Hanna Barvinok in her hometown museum

Streets named after Hanna Barvinok exist in several settlements of Ukraine. A statue of Barvinok also stands at her historical homestead, now the Hannyna Pustyn Historical and Memorial Museum-Reserve.

The most complete collection of her work was published in the 2002 book Ганна Барвінок (English: Hanna Barvinok), edited by Volodymyr Yatsyuk and Vasyl Shenderovsky. In 2018, the National Writers' Union of Ukraine held an event in Kyiv to celebrate the 190th anniversary of Barvinok's birth.
