= Kostomarov =

Kostomarov (Russian: Костомаров, masculine) or Kostomarova (Russian: Костомарова, feminine) is a Russian surname. Notable people with the surname include:

- Dmitry Kostomarov (1929–2014), Soviet Russian mathematician
- Grigory Kostomarov (1896–1970), Soviet historian
- Mykola Kostomarov (1817–1885), Russo–Ukrainian historian
- Nikita Kostomarov (born 1999), Belarusian association football player
- Roman Kostomarov (born 1977), Russian ice dancer
