= Neophytes (poem) =

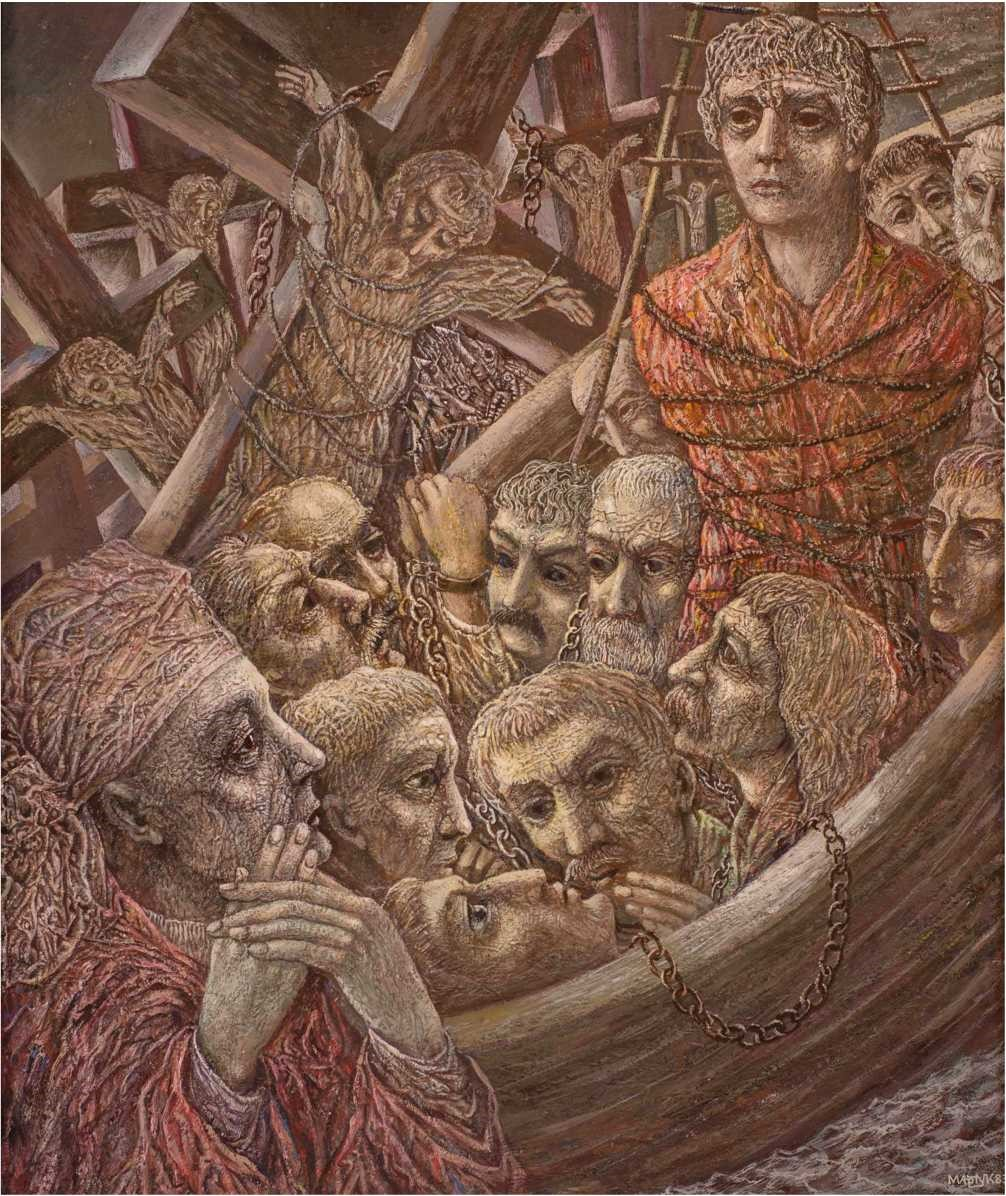
Illustration to an episode of the poem by Ivan Marchuk

Neophytes (Ukrainian: Неофіти) is an 1857 historiсal poem by Taras Shevchenko. Dedicated to an episode from Roman history during the times of Nero, it is seen as an allegory of the persecution of Ukrainian activists in the Russian Empire.

== Creation and publication ==
The poem was created by Shevchenko during his stay in Nizhny Novgorod in December 1857. Next month he sent a copy of the text to Panteleimon Kulish with a request to share it with Mikhail Shchepkin. Shevchenko himself considered the text to be not complete, and both he and Kulish recognized it as unsuitable for print. The version sent to Kulish is considered to have been lost. In 1859 Shevchenko sent Marko Vovchok another version of the poem. Neophytes was first published in 1862 in the Osnova magazine. The version kept by Vovchok was printed in the Prague edition of Kobzar in 1876.

== Content ==
The poem tells the story of Alcides, son of a Roman woman, who converted to Christianity after meeting Peter the Apostle, which led to his martyrdom in the Colosseum, where he was executed along with other neophytes during the rule of Nero. The text contains reminiscences of the author's contemporary Russian realities, including comparisons between Roman legions and the Tsarist army, mentions of banishment to Scythia as the ancient analogue of Siberian exile, and parallels between Roman patricians and Russian nobility.

== Sources ==
- Original text of the poem (in Ukrainian)
