= Vasyl Bilozersky =

Ukrainian political and cultural activist (1825–1899)

- Василь Білозерський
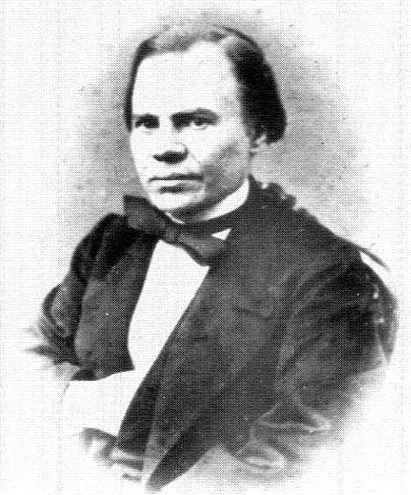
- Born: 1825; Olenivka, Chernigov Governorate, Russian Empire
- Died: 4 March 1899 (aged 73–74); Motrovnivka, Chernigov Governorate, Russian Empire (now near Borzna, Chernihiv Oblast, Ukraine)
- Occupations: journalist, scientist, pedagogue

Vasyl Mykhailovych Bilozersky (Ukrainian: Василь Михайлович Білозерський; 1825 – 4 March 1899) was a Ukrainian political and cultural activist, journalist, scientist, pedagogue.

He was a brother of Hanna Barvinok (real name Oleksandra Bilozerska), who was married to Panteleimon Kulish. Their father was Mikhail (or Mykhail) Bilozersky, a Marshal of Nobility for the local area. Their mother was Paraska Hryhorivna Kostenetska, the daughter of a Cossack soldier.

After graduating in 1846 from the Kiev University, for couple of years Vasyl Bilozersky was an instructor at the Peter Cadet Corps school in Poltava. During that period together with Mykola Kostomarov and Mykola Hulak, he became the organizer of one of the first political organization in the Russian Empire, the Brotherhood of Saints Cyril and Methodius.

As a member of the brotherhood, Bilozersky participated in the creation of the statute of the Slavic Brotherhood of Saints Cyril and Methodius and authored the Note, which was an explanation to the brotherhood's statute. Bilozersky developed the idea of Christian Socialism and promoted union of all Slavic nations in republican federation where the leading role would have played Ukraine.

In 1847, he was arrested and sent to Olonets Governorate where he worked at the Petrozavodsk Government Administration. In 1856, Bilozersky was freed from his exile and he moved to Saint Petersburg where he joined the local hromada organization. From 1861 to 1862, Bilozersky became the editor of the first Ukrainian monthly magazine in the city Osnova that was published mainly in Ukrainian.

Later he served in Warsaw where Bilozersky kept relations with Galicia and cooperated with magazines Meta and Pravda. The last days of his life he spent in Motronivka.
