= Hromada (secret society) =

Community Громади
- Leader: Mykhailo Drahomanov (until 1886)
- Founded: 1859; 167 years ago
- Dissolved: 1917; 109 years ago
- Preceded by: Brotherhood of Saints Cyril and Methodius
- Succeeded by: Ukrainian Radical Party
- Ideology: Liberalism; Federalism; Europeanism; Ukrainian nationalism
- Political position: Left-wing

A hromada (Ukrainian: [ɦroˈmɑdɐ], 'community') was an organization acting as part of a network of secret societies of the Ukrainian intelligentsia that appeared soon after the Crimean War. The societies laid a groundwork for emergence of the Ukrainian political elite and national political movement, which intensified with the January Uprising and issuing of the Valuev Circular. Many members of the hromadas had earlier belonged to the disbanded Brotherhood of Saints Cyril and Methodius.

In parallel to the development of hromada networks in the Russian Empire, Prosvita (Enlightenment) societies sprang forth in the Ukrainian-populated parts of the Austro-Hungarian Empire.

Important hromadas existed in Saint Petersburg, Kyiv, Poltava, Chernihiv, Odesa, Ternopil, Lviv, Chernivtsi, and Stryi.

The first hromada was established in Saint Petersburg where the original members of the Brotherhood of Saints Cyril and Methodius returned from their exile. An important publication of the Petersburg hromada was the magazine Osnova (Basis) that was published for a short time in 1860s.

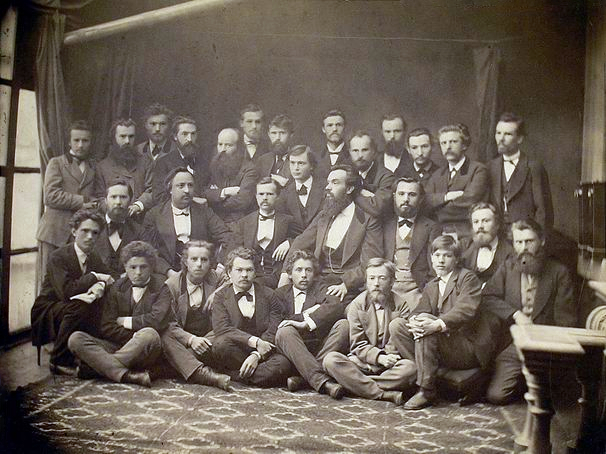
Members of Kyiv Old Hromada in 1874 2nd row (left to right): Mykola Lysenko, Pavlo Chubynskyi, Ivan Nechuy-Levytskyi, Mykhailo Starytskyi, Orest Levytskyi; 3rd row: Mykhailo Drahomanov (2nd from left), Khvedir Vovk (7th from left), Volodymyr Antonovych (8th from left), Pavlo Zhytetskyi (2nd from right).

Due to student unrest and other revolutionary activity the Russian minister of internal affairs Pyotr Valuev arrested several hromada leaders (Pavlo Chubynsky, Petro Yefymenko, and others) and exiled them to Siberia. In 1863, after the publication of the Pylyp Morachevskyi's New Testament in Ukrainian, Valuev banned most of Ukrainian publications and issued his secret Valuev Circular as an instruction to the minister of education. That same year most of the western regions of the Russian Empire rebelled in the January Uprising.

The most important hromada was created in Kyiv and became better known as the Old Hromada. It was created sometime in 1870s and was based on a secret club of chlopomans ("lovers of commoners").

As a reaction to the hromada movement, the Russian government issued the well known Ems Ukaz in 1876 prohibiting the use of Ukrainian language.

In 1897, on initiative of Volodymyr Antonovych and Oleksandr Konysky, Kyiv hosted a congress of Hromada members, which established the General Ukrainian Non-partisan Democratic Organization. The new organization involved all members of Hromada that were active in 20 cities of the Russian-ruled Ukraine. Separate Hromada societies continued to exist until the February Revolution in 1917.

== See also ==
- Hromada (disambiguation)
- Bratstvo: Brotherhood of Saints Cyril and Methodius, political and cultural organizations
- Mykhailo Drahomanov
