= Kharkiv Romantic School =

The Kharkiv Romantic School (Ukrainian: Харківська школа романтиків, romanized: Kharkivska shkola romantykiv) was a young poets' group among the faculty and students of Kharkiv University that operated in two successive circles from the 1820s to the 1840s. The school's defining characteristic, as argued by Ahapii Shamrai who coined the term, was not a shared poetic style or ideology but an orientation towards Ukrainian folk creative tradition and the Ukrainian language that had not been fully developed before, and which shaped the romantic outlook of its members. Members included Izmail Sreznevskyi, Amvrosii Metlynskyi, Mykola Kostomarov, Levko Borovykovskyi, Mykhailo Petrenko, Ivan Roskovshenko, Opanas Shpyhotskyi, Oleksandr Korsun, and Yakiv Shchoholiv.

== Background ==
The name was proposed by the publisher of their works, researcher Ahapii Shamrai, in his book "A. Kharkivska shkola romantykiv" from 1930. (Note: Mykola Dashkevych had, prior to Shamrai, used the separate term "Kharkiv intellectual movement" to designate the same idea, but this never caught on.) In the text, he proposes the group based off the writers being associated with Kharkiv University during the 1830s-40s, but also argues the more defining characteristic of the entire school across all of its generations was not a shared poetic style or ideology but rather a Ukrainian-shaped pull towards folk creative tradition. He stated that this tradition was what shaped all of the writers' romantic orientation in their works. Furthermore, he states that the incorporation of folklore was not something from a Western romantic doctrine, but that it came naturally from Ukraine and became most visible during the time period, a tendency he argued was already visible in what he called "pre-romantic" writers like Ivan Kotliarevsky and Semen Hulak-Artemovsky.

== Influences ==
The school was based off multiple strands of European romanticism. This included German romanticism (particularly Heidelberg Romantics and Jena Romanticism), English romanticism (such as the Lake Poets), Polish Romanticism through Adam Mickiewicz, and Czech romanticism through translations of Rukopis královédvorský.

== History ==
The school grew out of the early 1800s, when romanticism came through Ukraine, which led to a heavy influence on the professors of the newly-founded Kharkiv University that was established in 1804. These professors thus started engaging with Ukrainian cultural heritage, and produced translations and studies of Ukrainian history and its language. The German professor, I. Kronenberg, at the university, was perhaps the most notable of these by spreading the ideas of Kant, Herder, and in particular Friedrich Wilhelm Joseph Schelling's Philosophy of Revelation.

The school consisted of two successive student circles, primarily organized around Izmail Sreznevsky. The first circle was active from the late 1820s to early 1830s, and included Borovykovskyi, Roskovshenko, and Shpyhotskyi among others. This circle produced the Ukrainskyi almanakh (Ukrainian Almanac) in 1831, and was oriented primarily towards the general aesthetic and philosophical dimensions of romanticism. The second circle was formed in the mid-1830s and included Kostomarov, Metlynskyi, Korsun, Shchoholiv, and Petrenko, and its activity coincided with the publication of Zaporozhskaia starina from 1833 to 1836. During this period, interest was primarily in the ethno-genetic sources of the Ukrainian people and the collection of folklore. According to Blyk, another researcher, there was a third generation in addition to the other two, which was characterized by a transition from ballad and folk song forms towards reflective lyric poetry.

== Legacy ==
The school left an impact on Ukrainian literature, particularly on the development of the Ukrainian language. It helped promote the emergence of a separate Ukrainian school from Ukrainian literature, and helped influence the works of Taras Shevchenko and Panteleimon Kulish. It also helped build ties with Czech writers, as the Ukrainians and Czechs worked extensively together during this period, which was published in the Časopis Národního muzea. Shamrai in his work argued that the school's most significant achievement was transforming folk songs from a source or parody to an actual foundational aesthetic and a basis of Ukrainian literature, which marked the transition from simple imitations of folk forms found in previous Ukrainian workers towards individual texts that were rooted in forms.
