= Włodzimierz Baworowski =

Austrian politician of Polish nationality

- Born: 1823
- Died: 7 July 1901 (aged 77–78); Ternopil
- Office: Deputy of the Imperial Council

Włodzimierz Count Baworowski of Baworów, Prus coat of arms (1823 – 7 July 1901, Ternopil) was an Austrian politician of Polish nationality from Galicia, in the second half of the 19th century a deputy of the Imperial Council.

== Biography ==
He owned the estate Strusiv in eastern Galicia.

He was also politically active. In 1861, he was elected to the Galician Diet for the curia of large landowners in the Ternopil region. On 1 February 1867, he defended his mandate in the diet, now for the curia of rural municipalities, district Terebovlia and Zolotnyky. The Diet then elected him on 2 March 1867 to the Imperial Council (then still indirectly elected) for the curia of rural municipalities in Galicia. On 3 June 1867, he took the oath. By a letter dated 31 March 1870, he resigned from his mandate as part of the mass resignation of Slavic deputies as an expression of disagreement with the constitutional direction of the state. He was again delegated by the Diet to the Imperial Council in 1871. He took the oath on 3 March 1871. He was re-elected in 1872. He took the oath on 13 January 1872, but did not exercise his mandate and was therefore declared expired due to absence on 21 April 1873.

For his loyalty during the Austro-Prussian War, he was awarded the Order of the Iron Crown on 16 December 1866.
