= Panteleimon Kulish =

Ukrainian writer, poet, and translator (1819–1897)

Panteleimon Kulish Пантелеймон Куліш
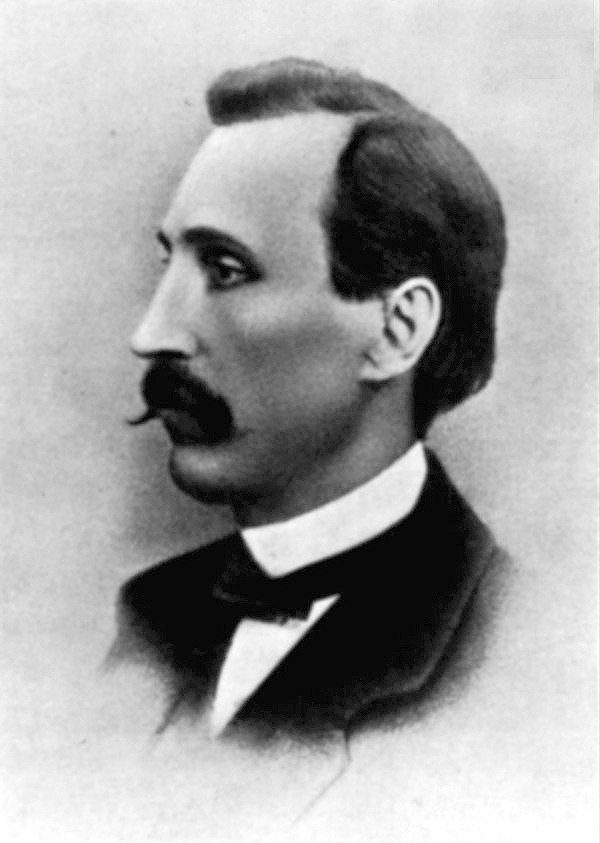
- Born: 7 August 1819; Voronizh (Chernigov Governorate, Russian Empire; present-day Sumy Oblast, Ukraine)
- Died: 14 February 1897 (aged 77); Motronivka, Chernigov Governorate, Russian Empire (near Borzna, in present-day Chernihiv Oblast, Ukraine)
- Occupations: Writer; critic; poet; folklorist; translator
- Spouse: Hanna Barvinok
- Writing career
- Notable works: Black Council; Kulish's Bible
- Movement: Romanticism

Signature
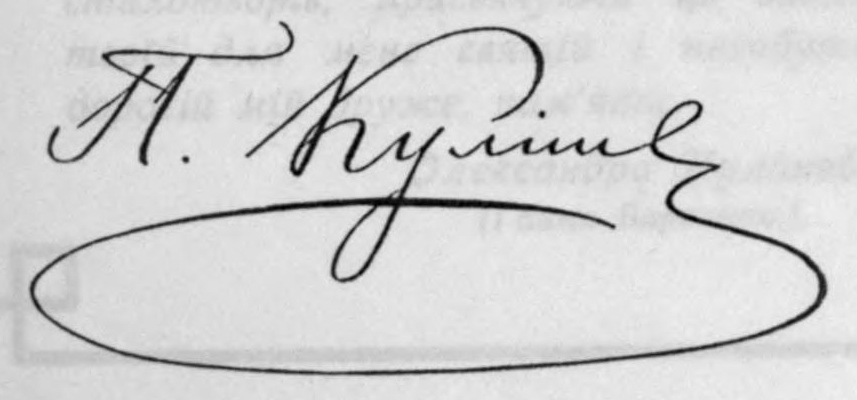

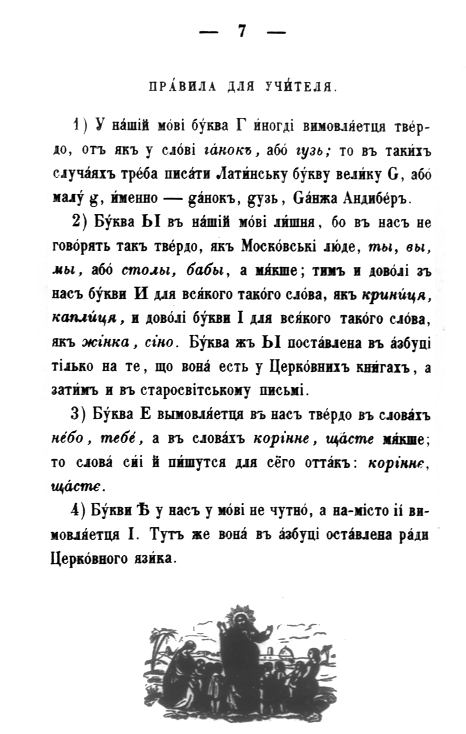
A page from Panteleimon Kulish's Gramatka, printed in 1857 in Saint Petersburg, showing suggestions for teachers in Ukraine

Panteleimon Oleksandrovych Kulish (Note: also spelled Panteleymon or Pantelejmon Kuliš) (Ukrainian: Пантелеймон Олександрович Куліш, Ukrainian pronunciation: [pɐnteɫei̯ˈmɔn oɫekˈsɑndrowɪt͡ʃ kʊˈlʲiʃ]; 7 August 1819 – 14 February 1897) was a Ukrainian writer, critic, poet, folklorist, translator and author of historical works.

A member of the Brotherhood of Saints Cyril and Methodius during his youth, after his arrest and exile for participating in the organization Kulish started to co-operate with Russian imperial authorities, abandoning his romantic views on Ukrainian history and supporting the incorporation of Ukraine by the Russian Empire, which caused a conflict between him and younger representatives of the Ukrainian national movement. A promoter of Ukraine's cultural development, Kulish also made an important contribution to the creation of modern Ukrainian orthography.

== Life ==
Panteleimon Kulish was born 7 August 1819 in Voronizh (now Sumy Oblast) into an impoverished Cossack gentry family. His mother, Kateryna Ivanivna, spoke exclusively Ukrainian and taught her son numerous folk songs, tales and legends. After completing only five years at the Novhorod-Siverskyi gymnasium, where he got acquainted with classical works of Russian literature and folklore, Kulish enrolled at Kyiv University in 1837 but was not allowed to finish his studies due to being unable to prove his nobility. Thanks to the protection of Mikhail Yuzefovich and Mykhailo Maksymovych, in 1840 he obtained a teaching position in Lutsk, where he wrote his first historical novella in Russian, Mykhailo Charnyshenko, or Little Russia Eighty Years Ago, as well as epic Ukraine (both published in Kyiv in 1843).

In 1843–45, Kulish taught in Kyiv and studied Ukrainian history and ethnography. There he befriended Taras Shevchenko, Mykola Kostomarov, and Vasyl Bilozersky; their circle later became the nucleus of the secret Brotherhood of Saints Cyril and Methodius, which envisioned a Ukrainian national rebirth, including national independence, within a free and equal Slavic federation. Soon after his marriage with Bilozersky's sister Hanna in 1847, Kulish was arrested for his participation in this organization, and spent some time in prison and a few years in exile. In the late 1850s, he was reunited with Kostomarov and others of the Cyril-Methodian "Brethren" and participated in the Ukrainian journal Osnova (The Foundation). At this time, he published his famous Notes on Southern Rus' in which he pioneered a new orthography for the Ukrainian vernacular, the Kulishivka alphabet, based on phonetics rather than etymology. This later became the basis of modern written Ukrainian language. In the early 1860s Kulish published several scientific papers on Ukrainian Medieval and Cossack history.

In 1864-1867 Kulish worked as a Russian official in Poland, which allowed him to access valuable documents concerning the history of Ukraine in local archives. Between 1868 and 1871 he lived in Galicia, where he engaged in publishing and translations of the Bible. After returning to Russia Kulish was employed as editor of the magazine published by the Ministry of Transport, simultaneously continuing his studies of Cossack history. In the 1860s and 1870s, Kulish gradually turned more conservative and began to criticize Shevchenko, the Cossack revolts, and the ideal of the Cossacks as defenders of popular liberty. Eventually, despite Tsarist repression of Ukrainian culture and the ban on the appearance of Ukrainian language in print, he developed a theory that Ukraine and Russia should be politically united but divergent in culture, an approach which won few adherents among the Ukrainian intelligentsia of the time. Nevertheless, this conservative approach to Ukrainian affairs was never completely extinguished and would be later resurrected in a different form by Ukrainian political thinkers such as Vyacheslav Lypynsky, Stepan Tomashivsky, and others.

In the 1880s, after the introduction of Ems Decree, Kulish moved to Austrian Galicia. In light of the ban on Ukrainian publications in the Russian Empire, he resigned from being a Russian subject and adopted the citizenship of Austria. In Galicia Kulish cooperated with the local Ukrainian cultural and political leaders. Thus he was one of the first Ukrainian figures to, at least in part, successfully bridge the gap between Russian and Austrian Ukraine. He also appealed to Poles, calling for them to recognize Ukrainians as equals and to establish mutual dialogue, but his proposal was ignored by most leaders of Galicia's Polish community. This led Kulish to return to his previous Russophile views. The author spent his last years isolated on his homestead in northern Ukraine. During these years he translated a great deal of west European literature, including Shakespeare, into Ukrainian, and continued historical studies. Kulish died and was buried in his residence at the khutir Motronivka.

== Literary activities ==
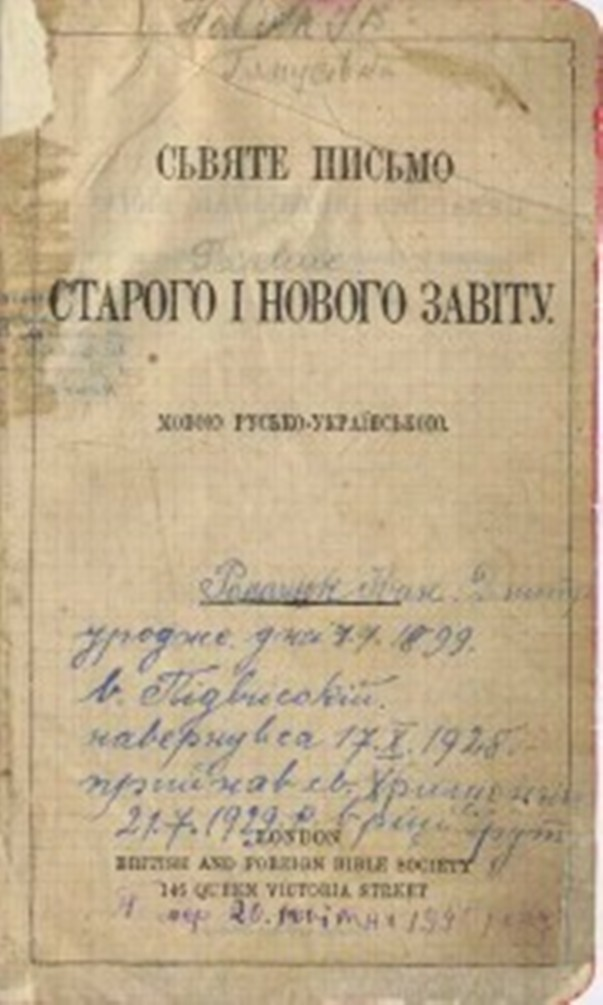
Translation of the Bible by Panteleimon Kulish

During his early years at the University of Kyiv, Kulish came under the influence of the historian and literary figure Mykhaylo Maksymovych, who turned his attention to his native Ukrainian culture. Maksymovych promoted Kulish's literary efforts and published several of his early stories. His first longer work written in Ukrainian was the epic poem Ukraina (1843). In Kyiv Kulish also got in contact with local Polish nobility and learned the Polish language, which allowed him to read the works of Adam Mickiewicz and other Polish-language authors. Living in Lutsk, he befriended Stefan Zienowicz, a Polish chemist and mineralogist who had earlier worked at the University of Kyiv, and had close relations with the city's Polish community. During his second period of life in Kyiv Kulish got acquainted with Polish writer and literary critic Michał Grabowski, who remained his lifelong friend. Thanks to his acquaintance with Grabowski's compatriot, antiquarian Stanisław Świdziński, Kulish got access to valuable documents of Polish-Ukrainian history, including materials from the time of Cossacks and Haidamaks, as well as written correspondence of hetman Pylyp Orlyk, letters and documents of the Khanenko family and the chronicle of Samiilo Velychko.

As a result of his research, Kulish created several historical novels in Ukrainian. His most famous contribution in this field was Black Council, which was dedicated to a historical event from Cossack times. The author was also active in historical writing, composing a brief history of Ukraine in verse (under the title Ukraina) and a much larger History of the Reunification of Rus in three volumes. The latter dealt with the era of Hetman Bohdan Khmelnytsky in the seventeenth century. His two-volume collection of Ukrainian folklore, Notes on Southern Rus retains its scholarly significance to the present day.

Together with Ivan Nechuy-Levytsky, and Ivan Puluj, Panteleimon Kulish was the first known person to translate the whole of the Bible into the modern Ukrainian language. The original Ukrainian translation of the Holy Script was published in Vienna in 1903 by the British and Foreign Bible Society.

== Views ==
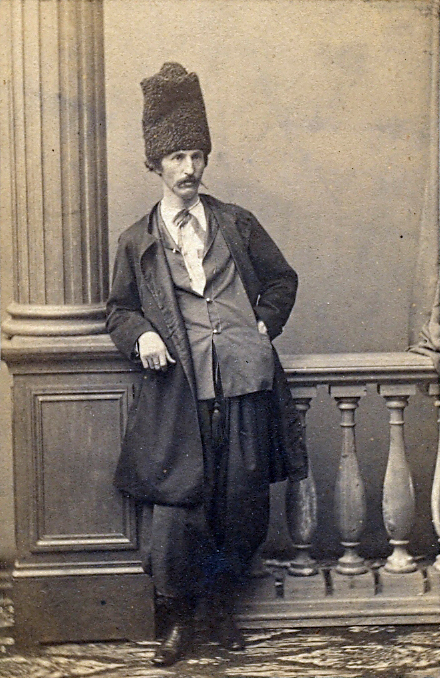
An 1861 photo of Kulish wearing Ukrainian national dress (see khlopomania)

Kulish's initial fascination with Cossacks, influenced by the romantic ideals of his youth, eventually gave way to a critical view on their historical role, and by the end of his life he tended to view both Cossacks and Haidamaks as destructive movements lacking any ideals of statehood. In his epilogue to the Black Council Kulish expressed an opinion, that Ukrainians as a nation were unable to exist in a state of their own, which later led him to support the attachment of Ukraine to Russia, causing a negative attitude from most of his Ukrainian coleagues. However, after the adoption of the Ems Decree Kulish recognized the harm brought to Ukraine by Moscow's rule and called on his compatriots to engage in more active development of Ukrainian literature and culture in Galicia. Kulish considered cultural development to be a way of turning Ukrainians from an "ethnographic nation" into a "political" one. He also opposed the notion of Ukrainian language being based exclusively on common speech and supported the inclusion of elements from the old literary language into modern Ukrainian.

Kulish was not among devoted proponents of the so-called "populist" school of Ukrainian history, which saw the Ukrainian society as exclusively democratic and standing in direct opposition to Polish aristocratism and Russification. Instead, he viewed high culture and statist tradition as important components of Ukrainians' development as a nation. He recognized the potential of the All-Russian political idea, simultaneously considering Polish rule over Ukraine to have been an important civilizing factor for the country, and refused to see Ukraine's historical development solely through the prism of Cossack history. In his public activities Kulish strove to achieve reconciliation between the Polish, Ukrainian and Russian nations.

== Historical work ==
Criticized for his subjective approach, lack of scientific attitude and generally controversial views, Kulish nevertheless had some influence on the development of Ukrainian historiography. His denial of the state-building ability of the Ukrainian people was based not on his opposition to the idea of Ukrainian statehood as such, but on the recognition of the fact, that in the past and during his lifetime Ukrainians lacked a kind of social group which would be suitable in order to build a state of their own. Unlike his contemporaries, who saw the roots of the Ukrainian nation in the Cossack era, Kulish considered them to hail from the times of the Kyivan state.

== Legacy ==
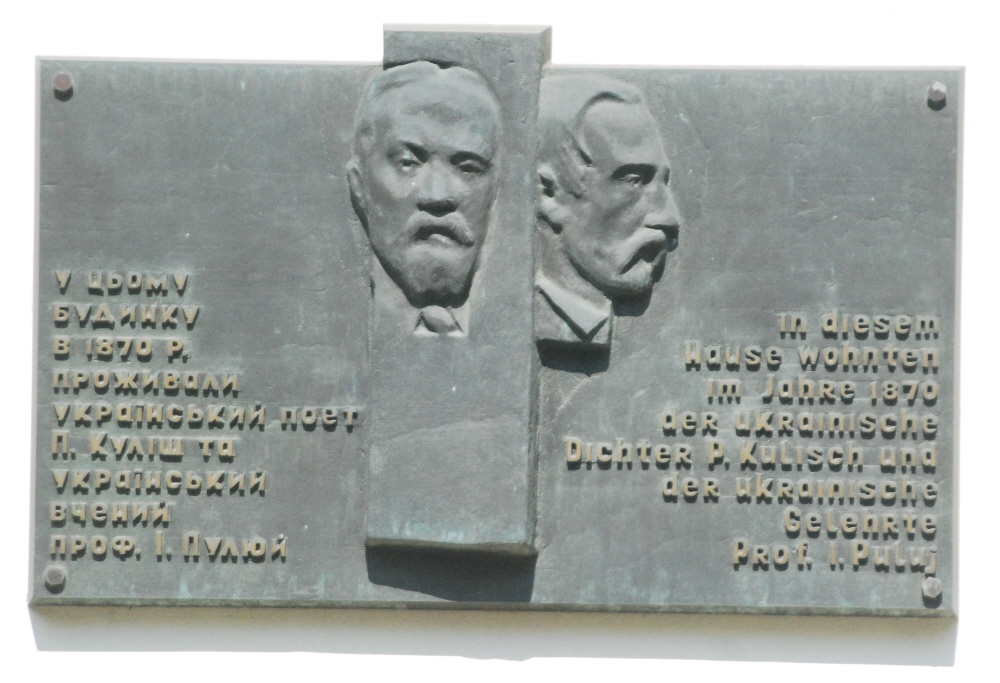
The inscription on the relief installed in Vienna reads: "In 1870 in this house lived the Ukrainian poet P.Kulish and the Ukrainian scientist Prof. I.Puliui." (Both in German and Ukrainian)

By the time of his death Kulish had broken relations with most of the revolutionary-minded Ukrainian intelligentsia due to his conservatism. Only during the 1910s did a revision of his views take place under the influence of the younger generation in Ukrainian literature. After the Revolution of 1917 Kulish's activities became an object of active studies, however in the 1930s those were abandoned under the pressure of the Soviet regime. As a result, works by Kulish were de-facto banned, with Black Council and a number of other texts being re-published only in 1958.

Kulish's works had a significant influence on the formation of Ukrainian intelligentsia and its views by introducing a native Ukrainian perspective on history as a counterweight to Russian imperial ideology.

On 7 August 2019, a Google Doodle was created to celebrate Kulish's 200th birthday.

== Adaptations ==
A nine-episode television series was created by Mykola Zaseyev-Rudenko on the base of Kulish's novel Black Council at the Dovzhenko Film Studios in 2000.

== See also ==
- Kulish's Bible
