= Yurii Andruzky =

Ukrainian political and cultural activist, poet and scientist (1864–?)

Yuriy Levovych Andruzky (7 June 1827 Vechirky, Piryatinsky Uyezd, Poltava Governorate — ?) was a Ukrainian political and cultural activist, poet and scientist.

== Biography ==
Born into a large family of a small landowner, a retired major.

After studying at the noble boarding school of the First Kyiv Gymnasium, in 1845 he entered the Kyiv University of St. Volodymyr, Faculty of Law.

In 1846, he began to participate in the activities of the Cyril and Methodius Brotherhood, where he was the youngest. While researching political and legal issues, he wrote two drafts of the Constitution: "The Project for Achieving the Possible Degree of Equality and Freedom (Mainly in the Slavic Lands)" and "The Ideal of the State".

On March 30, 1847, he was arrested. Both projects, and a notebook of poems, were attached to the case. He was sent under police supervision to Kazan, with the right to enter Kazan University. In December 1847 he was expelled at his own request due to poor eyesight.

Transferred (1848) to the Olonets province, to Petrozavodsk, where he served as a clerk.

During an unexpected search, the gendarmes found 14 notebooks with notes. Among them was the latest version of the Constitution — "Outline of the Constitution of the Republic", which proposed to create a federation of Slavic peoples — the Slavic United States without Russia. The Slavic republic of equal states with a center in Kyiv was to include 7 autonomous regions with their own presidents: 1) Ukraine with Galicia, the Black Sea, and Crimea; 2) Poland with Poznan, Lithuania, and Žmudda; 3) Bessarabia with Moldova and Wallachia; 4) Ostsee; 5) Serbia; 6) Bulgaria; and 7) the Don. It was an original and bold idea: the restoration of the Hetmanate, if possible separately, if not, in Slavic Ukraine. Among the entries was the following: "To create Ukraine, it is necessary to destroy Russia." Governor M. Pysarev reported to the chief of gendarmes, Count A. F. Orlov: "Andruzsky, as a stubborn Little Russian, remained with the same ridiculous and criminal thoughts that I found in the commission established in 1847 under your leadership, in which I had the honor to be a member."

- He was arrested and imprisoned in the Solovetsky Monastery (1850–1854) for violating the exile regime.
- In July 1854, during an attack on the monastery by an Anglo-French squadron (during the Crimean War), Andruzkyi distinguished himself by bravery and was transferred to Arkhangelsk, where he served in the office of the Arkhangelsk Chamber of the Criminal and Civil Court (1854–1857).
- In 1856, he was allowed to return to Poltava province.
- 1857-1864 he was in Ukraine under police surveillance. He served in the Poltava District Court.
- In 1864, his name was mentioned in connection with the issue of lifting police surveillance.
- How he lived his last years and when he died is unknown.

Author of "Sketches of the Constitution of the Republic" (1850) and poetry. Under the influence of Taras Shevchenko, whom he met in Kyiv in the summer of 1846, he wrote poems reflecting the fate of enslaved Ukraine ("Do not cry, dear mother," "Ukraine" and others).
