= Books of the Genesis of the Ukrainian People =

Philosophical and religious treatise

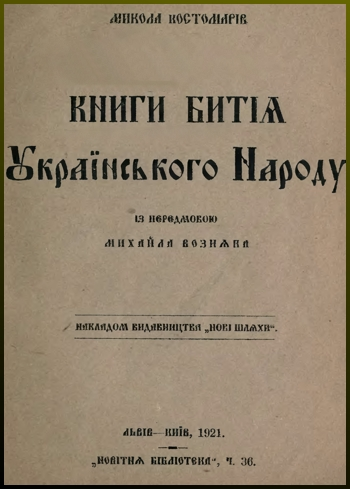
Books of the Genesis of the Ukrainian people (Title page of 1921 year edition)

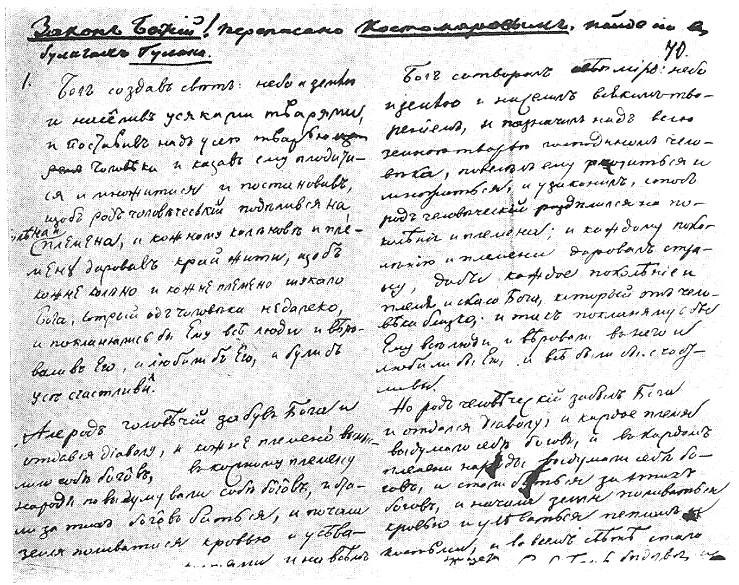
First page manuscript in two languages (about years 1845-46)

The Books of the Genesis of the Ukrainian People (also called the Divine Law; Ukrainian: Книги Буття Українського Народу, romanized: Knyhy Buttia Ukrayinskoho Narodu) is a philosophical and religious treatise attributed to Mykola Kostomarov, (some experts i.e. Myroslav Trofymuk question the authorship) dedicated to designation of Ukrainian nation as part of Christian history. It reflected the ideology of the secret organization known as the Brotherhood of Saints Cyril and Methodius.

== Main essence ==
In the center of "Books" is the category of freedom, which is treated as the main medium unity between man and God. God desired freedom for communication with the man, and the rupture with God also leads to the loss of freedom and rupture with freedom leads to alienation with God. On this basis "Books" interpreted the major events of human history. Success or decline of the nations are dependent on the degree of their freedom and unity with God. Creation and historical experience of Ukraine within the 16th–18th centuries is recognized as the closest restoration of lost ideal primarily designed by God—an equal society of believers.

== Structure and content ==
"Books" is divided into four semantic parts.

The first part is an imitation of the biblical story of God creating the world and people, their happiness and fall, the result of which was polytheism, death, disease and worst of all slavery.

The second part depicts the historical experience of five "nations": Jews, Greeks, Romance, Germanic peoples and Slavs. Their experience is evaluated according to exercising faith in God and freedom. The Jewish people created and chosen by God himself asked the king, left thus free and close relationship with God; Greeks cherished freedom but did not know one true God therefore could not implement it, gradually adopting the imperial power of the Roman (Byzantine) emperor and declined; The Romance people adopted Christianity, but established the royal power of the pope and therefore also departed from the original divine plan; Germanic peoples, thanks to Luther's Reformation, established the most advance form of Christianity, but then again returned hierarchy and domination of one class over another. Finally Slavic people was naturally inclined to freedom but as a "younger brothers" started to copied what they have seen in other nations and repeated their mistakes. The only exception was Ukraine, which took the form of general social equality and fraternity performed by Cossacks and religious Brotherhoods.

The third part is a brief description of the development of Ukraine between two Slavic states – Poland and Muscovy – and its conflict with them, which was initially successful, but then turned in to division between the two hostile countries into two halves.

The fourth part provides a conceptualization of the Ukrainian narrative. Ukraine is seen as a territory where was renewed a God`s plan of human society as a community of free and equal people, who thus are able to do unselfish good deeds to neighbors, and a Ukrainian as a person who fundamentally rejects any form of predominance, recognizing only the power of God which denied pride.

== Concept of power ==
According to the "Books" Good and Evil have their own form of government: Good in the form of service, and the Evil in the form of predominance. The service-power is an expression of God's love for man and his desire to make man as happy as he himself. It originated the idea of equality. The service-power is committed to equality of individuals who are perfect because of their relationship with God. The predominance-power is associated with pride—a nature of Devil, and needs to humiliate the subject of power is arising from necessity to feel self-admiration and of own greatness. This predominance-power originated inequality. Therefore, the power-domination leads to social hierarchy and stratification. Thus the service-power is a progress source for individuals and society and the predominance-power the source of their degradation.

== See also ==
- History of Ruthenians
