= Brotherhood of Saints Cyril and Methodius =

Brotherhood of Saints Cyril and Methodius Кирило-Мефодіївське товариство
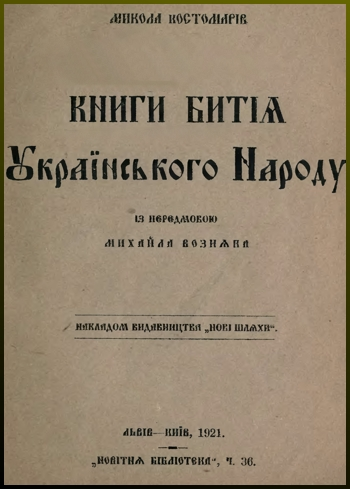
- The Books of Genesis of the Ukrainian Nation by Mykola Kostomarov
- Leader: Mykola Kostomarov
- Founded: December 1845
- Dissolved: March 1847
- Succeeded by: Hromada
- Headquarters: Kyiv
- Membership (1846): 13 (active); 100 (total)
- Ideology: Liberalism; Pan-Slavism; Slavophilia; Ukrainian nationalism
- Political position: Left-wing
- Religion: Eastern Orthodox

The Brotherhood of Saints Cyril and Methodius (Ukrainian: Кирило-Мефодіївське братство, romanized: Kyrylo-Mefodiivske bratstvo; Russian: Кирилло-Мефодиевское братство) was a short-lived secret political society that existed in Kyiv, at that time a part of the Russian Empire.

The organization predated the Spring of Nations in Eastern Europe just by few years. Founded in December 1845 or in January 1846, the society sought to revive the ideals of the traditional Ukrainian brotherhoods and envisioned a Ukrainian national revival, including national autonomy within a free and equal Slavic federation. It was quickly suppressed by the government in March 1847 with most of the members punished by internal exile or imprisonment.

The goals of the society were liberalisation of the political and social system of the Imperial Russia in accordance with the members Christian principles and the Slavophile views that gained popularity among the country's liberal intelligentsia. Created under the initiative of Mykola Kostomarov (1818-1885), an historian of Russia and Ukraine, the society was named after Saints Cyril and Methodius, widely regarded as heroes for the Slavic nations celebrated for spreading Christianity and inventing the Cyrillic alphabet used by multiple Slavic languages.

The society goals included the abolition of serfdom, broad access to public education, transformation of the Russian Empire into a federation of Slavic peoples with the Russians being one among equals rather than the dominant nation, and, according to Mykhailo Hrushevsky, the implementation of liberal democratic principles of freedom of speech, thought and religion.

Members of the society included Panteleimon Kulish (1819-1897), Yurii Andruzky (1827 - after 1864), Vasyl Bilozersky (1825-1899), Mykola Hulak (1821-1899), and Dmytro Pylchykov (1821-1893). Taras Shevchenko (1814-1861) was arrested because his poems had been found by the secret police among the documents of the participants and he was the champion of the independence of Ukraine, not being the part of federation.

== See also ==
- Books of the Genesis of the Ukrainian People
- Bratstvo
- Saints Cyril and Methodius
- Hromada (secret society)
- Taras Brotherhood
