= Yurasovka =

Yurasovka Юрасовка
- Sloboda
- Location within Voronezh Oblast Location within Russia
- Coordinates: 50°29′N 39°11′E
- Country: Russia
- Region: Voronezh Oblast
- District: Olkhovatsky District
- Time zone: UTC+3:00

Yurasovka (Russian: Юрасовка) is a rural locality (a sloboda) in Karayashnikovskoye Rural Settlement, Olkhovatsky District, Voronezh Oblast, Russia. The population was 764 as of 2010. There are 8 streets.

== Geography ==
Yurasovka is located 31 km (19 mi) north of Olkhovatka (the district's administrative centre) by road. Posyolok imeni Lenina is the nearest rural locality.
