= Grigory Kostomarov =

Russian writer (1896–1970)

Grigory Dementevich Kostomarov (Russian: Григорий Дементьевич Костомаров; 1896 – 1970 in Moscow), was a Russian writer, participant of the October Revolution, Doktor Nauk in Historical Sciences, professor, head of the Department of CPSU History at the Academy of Social Sciences at the Central Committee of the CPSU, director of the Institute of CPSU History at the Moscow City Committee of the CPSU. He died in Moscow, was buried at the Novodevichy Cemetery. His wife is Zolotova-Kostomarova Maria Iosifovna (Russian: Золотова-Костомарова Мария Иосифовна, 1903–1972, Moscow), doctor, Doktor Nauk in Medical Sciences, professor. His son is Vitaly Grigorievich Kostomarov.

== Books ==
In Russian

- Московский Совет в 1905 году (Moscow Soviet in 1905). – Москва : Моск. рабочий, 1955. – 200 с., 1 л. план. : ил.;
- Советы рабочих депутатов в революции 1905 года (Soviets of Workers' Deputies in the 1905 Revolution)/ Г. Костомаров. – Пенза : изд. и типолит. изд-ва газ. "Сталинск. знамя", 1945. – 16 с.; 14 см. – (Библиотечка агитатора и пропагандиста);
- Советы рабочих депутатов 1905 года и их историческое значение (Soviets of Workers' Deputies in the 1905 Revolution) : Стенограмма публичной лекции... / Проф. Г. Д. Костомаров. – Москва : Знание, 1955. – 40 с.; 22 см. – (Серия 1/ Всесоюз. о-во по распространению полит. и науч. знаний; № 13);
- Листовки Московской организации большевиков 1914–1920 гг. (Leaflets of the Moscow organization of the Bolsheviks in 1914–1920.) : Сборник / ред. Калошин Ф. – Москва : Госполитиздат, 1940. – 328 с.;
- От Красной гвардии к Красной армии в Москве (From the Red Guard to the Red Army in Moscow) / Г. Костомаров; Истпарт МК ВКП(б). – [Москва] : Моспартиздат, 1933 (тип. издат. "Крест. газ."). – Обл., 96 с. : ил.;
- Октябрь в Москве (October in Moscow): Материалы, документы / Составил Г. Костомаров; МОК ВКП(б). Истпарт. – Москва; Ленинград : Гос. соц.-экон. изд-во, 1932. – 208 с. : факс.;
- Бог и его подвижники (God and his Ascetics)/ Г. Костомаров; Центральный совет Союза воинствующих безбожников СССР. – Москва : Безбожник, 1930. – 96 с. вкл. ил.;
- Из истории Московского вооруженного восстания (From the history of the Moscow armed uprising): Материалы и документы / Сост. Г. Костомаров, В. Симоненко и А. Дрезин. – Москва : Московский рабочий, 1930. – 232 с. : ил.;
- Черная сотня под флагом религии в 1905 году (The Black Hundred under the Flag of Religion in 1905) / Г. Д. Костомаров; Центр. совет Союза воинствующих безбожников СССР. – Москва : Безбожник, 1931. – 46 с., [1] с. объявл. : ил.;
- Листовки Московской организации большевиков 1914–1920 гг. (Leaflets of the Moscow organization of the Bolsheviks in 1914–1920.) : Сборник / Ин-т истории партии при МК ВКП(б). – [Москва] : Госполитиздат, 1940. – 312 с., 4 вкл. л. ил. : ил.;
- Москва социалистическая (Socialist Moscow): Стенограмма публичной лекции, прочит. 25-го июня 1947 г. в Лекц. зале в Москве / канд. ист. наук Г. Д. Костомаров; Всесоюз. о-во по распространению полит. и науч. знаний. – Москва : [Правда], 1947 (тип. им. Сталина). – 32 с.;
- Московский совет рабочих депутатов в 1905 году (Moscow Soviet in 1905)/ Г. Костомаров; Ин-т истории партии МГК ВКП(б), филиал Ин-та Маркса-Энгельса-Ленина при ЦК ВКП(б). – [Москва] : изд-во и тип. изд-ва "Моск. рабочий", 1948. – 152 с. : ил.;
- Незабываемое (Unforgettable): [В. И. Ленин в Москве и Подмосковье] / Ин-т истории партии МК и МГК КПСС – филиал Ин-та марксизма-ленинизма при ЦК КПСС. – Москва : Моск. рабочий, 1960. – 176 с., 1 л. портр. : ил., портр.;
- Организация Красной Армии. 1917–1918 (Organization of the Red Army. 1917–1918): Сб. документов и мат-лов / Г. Д. Костомаров, Р. И. Голубева; Секретариат Гл. редакции "Истории гражд. войны в СССР". Упр. гос. архивами НКВД СССР. – Москва : Госполитиздат, 1943. – 192 с., 2 вкл. л. портр. : ил., факс.;
- Из истории Московской рабочей красной гвардии (From the history of the Moscow Labor Red Guard): Материалы и документы / Собраны и подготовлены к печати Г. Д. Костомаровым и Вл. Малаховским; Истпарт МК ВКП(б). – Москва : Госиздат РСФСР, 1930 ("Московский рабочий"). – 208 с.;
- 1917 год в Москве (1917 in Moscow)/ [Ред. проф. Г. Костомаров]. – Москва : Моск. рабочий, 1957. – 206 с., 1 л. план. : ил.;

In German

- W. I. Lenin und der Kampf um die Bildung einer Organisation der SDAPR in Moskau : Zum Kap. I der "Geschichte der Kommunistischen Partei der Sowjetunion (Bolschewiki), kurzer Lehrgang" / G. Kostomarow. – Berlin : Dietz, 1950. – 13 с.; 20 см. – (Lehrmaterialien für Parteischulen, Fernunterricht und Selbststudium. Kursus Geschichte der KPdSU(B) / Sozialistische Einheitspartei Deutschlands. Zentralkomitee. Abteilung Propaganda; Hft. 2);

In Polish

- Moskiewska rada delegatów robotniczych w 1905 r. / G. Kostomarow; Tłum. Czesław Dyja. – Warszawa : Książka i wiedza, 1951. – 135 с.;

In Hungarian

- A szocialista Moszkva / G. D. Kosztomarov; Fordította Trócsányi György. – Budapest : Művelt nép könyvkiadó, 1951. – 37 с., 5 л. ил. : ил.
