= Petro Yefymenko =

Ukrainian ethnographer and historian

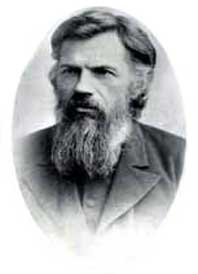
Petro Yefymenko

Petro Yefymenko (or Jefymenko Ukrainian: Петро Єфименко, pseud. Petro Odynets), (2 September 1835, in Velykyi Tokmak, Berdiansk county, Ukraine – 7 May 1908, in Saint Petersburg, Russia) was a Ukrainian ethnographer and historian, statistician by profession.

== Life and work ==
Petro Yefymenko studied at Kharkiv University until his expulsion (1855-1858) and Moscow University (1858–1859). As a student, he belonged to secret student societies, including Kharkiv-Kyiv Secret Society (1856-1860).

In 1860 Petro Yefymenko was accused of Ukrainian separatism. He was arrested and exiled for 10 years to Perm and then Arkhangelsk, Russia. During his exile, Petro Yefymenko collected materials on the local ethnography, folklore and law. His publications on this topic include: Pridanoe po obychnomu pravu krestyan v Arkhangelskoi Gubernii [Dowry according to the customary law of the peasants of Arkhangelsk governorate], Saint Peteresburg, 1873.

Petro Yefymenko returned to Ukraine in 1877, firstly to Chernihiv and then, two years later, to Kharkiv. He devoted himself to ethnographic and historical research and writings. Significant part of his work consisted of traveling throughout Ukraine gathering relevant materials. In 1884–1888 he worked as editor of Kharkovskyi kalendar [Kharkiv calendar], where he started publishing works of another famous Ukrainian ethnographer Pavlo Chubynsky, as well as bibliography of Chubynsky's works. Petro Efymenko's works were published in a number periodicals, including: Osnova, Russia; weekly newspaper Chernigovskii Listok, Ukraine (founded and edited by Leonid Hlibov); and Kievskaya starina [Kyivan antiquity], Ukraine.

== Family ==
- Wife – Olexandra Yefymenko (née, Stavrovskaya), (30 April 1848 – 18 December 1918), a historian. She was the first woman in Ukraine and in the Russian Empire to be awarded an honorary PhD (1910).
- Son – Taras Yefymenko, a lawyer.
- Son – Petro Yefymenko, an archaeologist.
- Daughter – Tetiana Yefymenko, a poet.

== Publications ==
1874 – Sbornik Malorossiyskikh zaklinaniy [Collection of Ukrainian spells], University Publishing, Moscow

1882 – “Arkhic Malorossiyskoy Kollehii pri Kharkovskom universitete”. [Archive of the Ukrainian Collegium at Kharkiv University], Kievskaya starina

1882 – “Posledniy pisar Voyska Zaporozhskoho Hloba” [Hloba, the last scribe of the Zaporizhian army], Kievskaya starina

1882 – “Ssylnye Malorossiyane v Arkhangelskoy Gubernii” [Exiled Ukrainians of Arkhangelsk governorate]. Kievskaya starina

1883 – “Shpitali v Malorosii” [Hospitals in Ukraine]. Kievskaya starina

1884 – “Mohily Hetmantsev v Lebedine”. [Hetmans’ tumulus in Lebedyn]. Kievskaya starina
