= Amvrosy Metlinsky =

Ukrainian poet, ethnographer, folklorist and panslavist

Amvrosii Metlynsky
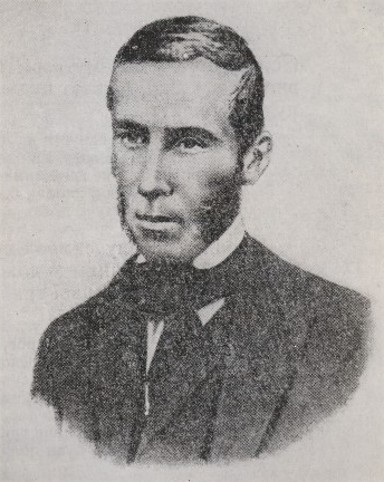
- Амвросій Метлинський
- Born: 1814; Sary Poltava region
- Died: 29 July 1870 (aged 55–56); Yalta
- Citizenship: Russian Empire
- Occupations: poet, ethnographer, publisher, professor
- Writing career
- Pen name: Amvrosii Mohyla
- Literary movement: Romanticism

Amvrosy Metlinsky (Russian: Амвросий Метлинский, Ukrainian: Амвросій Метлинський, romanized: Amvrosii Metlynskyi; 1814 in Sary, Poltava Governorate, Russian Empire – 29 July 1870 in Yalta, Taurida Governorate, Russian Empire) was a Ukrainian poet, ethnographer, folklorist and panslavist. Professor at the Imperial University of Kharkov.

Metlinsky was a professor of Russian literature at Kharkov University from 1843 to 1849, and again from 1854 to 1858. From 1849 to 1854 he was a professor at Kiev University. During the 1830s, the city of Kharkov became the center of Ukrainian Romanticism. Metlinsky and other authors such as Izmail Sreznevsky and Nikolay Kostomarov published ethnographic materials, native interpretations of Ukrainian history, and collections of folk legends and Cossack chronicles. In 1839, he published a collection of poetry called Dumky i pisni ta shche deshcho (Thoughts and Songs and Some Other Things) under his pseudonym Amvrosii Mohyla. In 1848, he published an anthology of works by other Kharkiv poets called Iuzhnyi russkii sbornik (Southern Russian Anthology).

Metlinsky's poetry contains his nostalgia for the glories of the Ukrainian Cossack past, which he believed were destined never to return. He described his poetry as "the work of the last bandurist who passes on the song of the past in a dying language". He did not believe in the possibility of a renaissance of the Ukrainian people, which led him to embrace Pan-Slavic unity and to place hope in Russia. His nostalgia prompted him to collect Ukrainian folk songs which he published in 1854. The most part of this collection was previously unpublished.

In his autobiography, Mykhailo Hrushevskyi mentions collections of Ukrainian folk songs published by Metlinsky as works that influenced him.
