= Levko Borovykovsky =

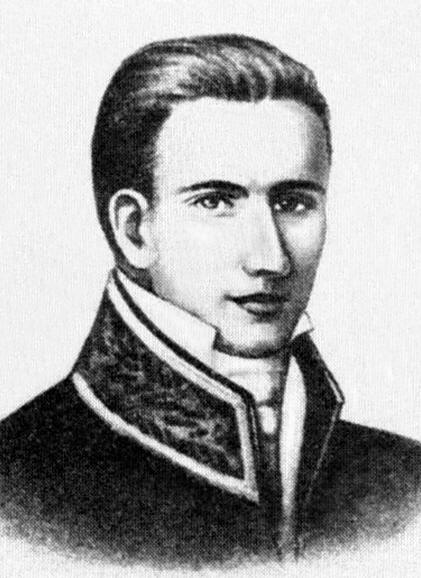
Levko Borovykovsky

Levko Borovykovsky ([Borovykovs'kyj] (22 February 1806 – 26 December 1889 in Myliushky village, Poltava Governorate, Russian Empire) was a Ukrainian romantic poet, writer, translator, and folklorist.

After graduating in 1830 from Kharkiv University, Borovykovsky taught in a Kursk gymnasium and from 1839 in the Poltava Institute for Daughters of the Nobility. In 1852 he became a gymnasium inspector in Poltava gubernia and retired a few years later. His works were first published in 1828, and he was one of the first poets of the Kharkiv Romantic School.

Of his numerous poems, the most notable is the ballad Marusia (1829), an adaptation of Gottfried August Bürger's ballad Lenore (1796) and reminiscent of Vasilii Zhukovsky's Svetlana (1813). Levko Borovykovsky successfully nationalised the Gothic-Romantic theme of Marusia, enriching its plot with elements of Ukrainian ethnography, including folklore.

During his lifetime only one collection of his writings was published, Baiky i Prybaiutky [Fables and Sayings] (1852), which brought him recognition as a storyteller. He also translated the poetry of Horace, Aleksandr Pushkin, and Adam Mickiewicz, compiled a Ukrainian dictionary, and collected Ukrainian folklore.
