= Orthodox brotherhood =

Religious group

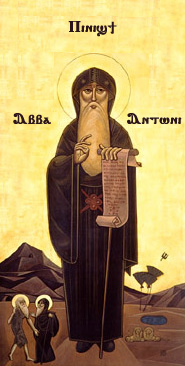
Saint Anthony the Great was known to have belonged to a brotherhood called the "Spoudaioi"

Brotherhoods (Russian and Ukrainian: братство; literally, "fraternity") were non-monastic unions of Eastern Orthodox and Greek Catholic citizens or lay brothers affiliated with individual autocephalous churches. Some of their focus was of an evangelical or theological character, but many of their activities were in fact secular. Their structure resembled that of medieval confraternities and trade guilds, and can be characterized as the Orthodox equivalent of Catholic religious orders. Unlike the religious orders of other religions such as those of sufism in Islam, they do not hold any uniquely esoteric views or doctrines, or have initiative practices otherwise unfound in mainstream orthodox monasticism.

== In Slavonic churches ==
Historically, they were common in the cities throughout the Ruthenian part of the Polish–Lithuanian Commonwealth such as Lviv, Wilno, Lutsk, Vitebsk, Minsk, and Kyiv. These Orthodox brotherhoods, first documented in 1463 (Lviv Dormition Brotherhood), were consolidated in the aftermath of the Union of Brest (1596) in order to oppose the conversion of Orthodox Christians to the Eastern Catholic Churches, the Counter-Reformation, and both real and imagined Polonization. The brotherhoods attempted to resist state-supported Catholic missionary activity by publishing books in the Cyrillic script and by financing a network of Orthodox schools which offered education in both Old Church Slavonic and the Ruthenian language. The famous Kyiv Mohyla Academy grew out of one such school under the umbrella of the Brotherhood Monastery in Kyiv. The Dormition Church, Lviv was financed by the brotherhood of the same name; its members also supported the Cossack risings in the east of Ukraine. The powerful Ostrogski family provided political support for their activities.

The activity of the Orthodox fraternities helped preserve the national culture of Ukraine and Belarus throughout the Counter-Reformation era. Most were closed in the course of the 18th century when Greek-Catholic proselytism had been forbidden by the House of Romanov. Some were revived in the late 19th century in order to stem "atheist propaganda" of the Nihilists. The Brotherhood of Saints Cyril and Methodius promoted national awareness, helping the Ukrainians of Imperial Russia discover their national identity. The Ostroh bratstvo was reinstituted by Countess Bludova, an ardent admirer of the Ostrogski family. Russian Orthodox immigrants to the U.S. formed brotherhoods to support church activities.

== Notable Orthodox Brotherhoods ==
- Army of the Lord
- Lviv Dormition Brotherhood
- Lutsk Orthodox Fellowship of the True Cross
- God-Prayer Congregation
- Brotherhood of Theologians for life (also known as "Zoe")
- The Soter brotherhood
- Brotherhood of St. Symeon the New Theologian
- Saint Paisios Brotherhood
- Nour al-Masih society

== See also ==
- History of Christianity in Ukraine
- Confraternity
