= Mykola Hulak =

Ukrainian politician (19th century)

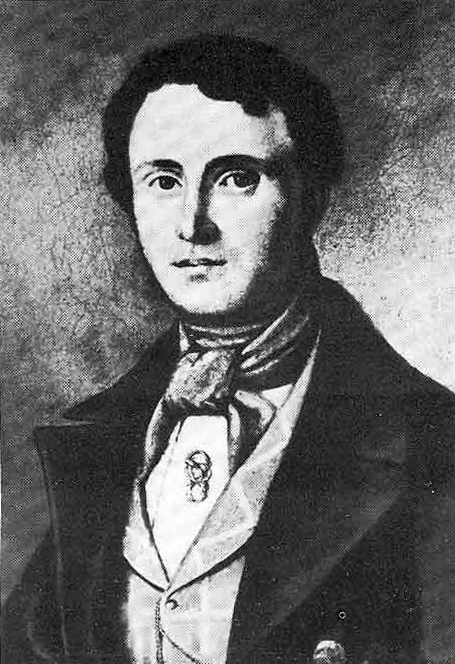
Mykola Hulak

Mykola Ivanovych Hulak (25 May 1821, Warsaw – 8 June 1899) was a Ukrainian political and cultural activist, journalist, scientist, interpreter, lawyer.
