= Curia (elections) =

Curia (electoral curia, Latin: cūria) is a special category of voters, a class or group of the population, which elects its deputies to representative bodies separately from other classes. Curiae are part of the curial system of elections (class system, rank system). They are distinguished by social status, property, nationality, race, or any other social qualification.

== History ==
- Three-class franchise — also known as the Prussian system, because it was in effect in Prussia from 1849 to 1918, but was also applied in many other countries.
- The electoral system in Cisleithania within the Austria-Hungary (in the Reichsrat until 1907 the curiae of large landowners, chambers of commerce and industry, cities, rural communities, in the Landtag and municipal councils until 1918) was curial.
- It existed in the elections to the Russian Empire.

== Russian Empire ==
In the Russian Empire, during elections to the State Duma, voters were divided into categories based on property and social status. Each curia elected a set number of deputies – usually regardless of the number of voters in that curia. Several new curiae were additionally organized several times, according to which voters were grouped and voted.

Historical variants
Electoral law of 6 August 1905	Law of 11 December 1905	Electoral system of 3 June 1907
3 curiae	4 curiae	5 curiae
1. Landowning; 2. Urban; 3. Peasant	1. Landowning; 2. Urban; 3. Peasant; 4. Worker	1. Landowning; 2. Large urban property owners 3. Small and medium urban property owners 4. Peasant; 5. Worker
