= Mykola Kostomarov =

Russian–Ukrainian historian (1817–1885)

- Микола Костомаров
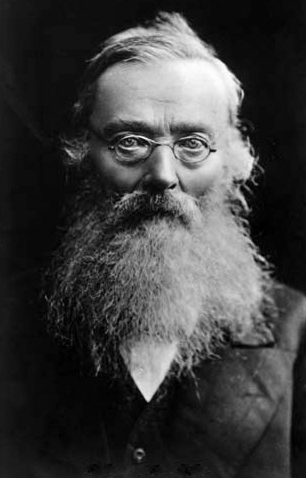
- Kostomarov in c. 1880
- Born: 16 May 1817; Yurasovka, Voronezh Governorate, Russian Empire
- Died: 19 April 1885 (aged 67); Saint Petersburg, Russian Empire
- Resting place: Literatorskiye Mostki, Saint Petersburg

Mykola Ivanovych Kostomarov (Ukrainian: Микола Іванович Костомаров; 16 May [O.S. 4 May] 1817 – 19 April [O.S. 7 April] 1885) or Nikolai Ivanovich Kostomarov (Russian: Николай Иванович Костомаров) was one of the most distinguished Russian–Ukrainian historians, one of the first anti-Normanists, and the father of modern Ukrainian historiography. He was a professor of Russian history at the St. Vladimir University of Kiev and later at the St. Petersburg University, an Active State Councillor of Russia, an author of many books, including his biography of Bohdan Khmelnytsky, research on Stepan Razin, and his fundamental three-volume Russian history in the biographies of its most important figures (Russian: Русская история в жизнеописаниях её главнейших деятелей).

Kostomarov was also known as one of the main figures of the Ukrainian national revival society best known as the Brotherhood of Saints Cyril and Methodius, which existed in Kiev from January 1846 to March 1847. Kostomarov was also a poet, ethnographer, pan-Slavist, and promoter of the so-called Narodnik movement in the Russian Empire.

== Historian ==
His father was a Russian landlord, Ivan Petrovich Kostomarov, and he belonged to Russian nobility. His distant family roots were in the Grand Duchy of Moscow from the reign of Boris Godunov. His mother Tatiana Petrovna Melnikova, was an ethnic Ukrainian peasant and one of his father's serfs; that is why Mykola Kostomarov de jure was a "serf" of his father. His father ended up marrying his mother, but he was born before this. His father wanted to adopt young Mykola, but he didn't get a chance before he was killed at the hands of his domestic serfs, in 1828, when Mykola was 11 years old. His father was known to be cruel to his serfs, and they reportedly stole his fathers money after they killed him.

Kostomarov was a specialist of East Slavic folklore. He put forward the idea that there are two types of Rus' people, those of the Kievan background, among the Dnieper Basin, which he called Southern Russians, and those of the Novgorodian background, which he called Northern Russians. Kostomarov observed Northern Russians as a political hegemon of the Russian state. As a historian, Kostomarov's writings reflected the romantic trends of his time. He was the first Russian historian who used of ethnography and folksong in history, and tried to discern the "spirit" of the people, including the so-called "national spirit", by this method (see about: Russian: народность, narodnost'). On the basis of their folksongs and history, he said that the peoples of what he called Northern or Great Rus' on one hand and Southern or Little Rus' on the other (Russians and Ukrainians, respectively) differed in character and formed two separate Russian nationalities. In his famous essay Two Russian Nationalities (Russian: Две русские народности), a landmark in the history of Narodniks thought, he wrote what some consider to be the ideas of Russians inclined towards autocracy, collectivism, and state-building, and Ukrainians inclined towards liberty, and individualism. The article of Kostomarov on the problem of the psychological diversity of Rus' people in the Russian Empire had an impact on the scientific research of the collective psychology in Eastern Europe.

In his various historical writings, Kostomarov was always very positive about Kievan Rus' and Novgorod Republic, about what he considered to be the veche system of popular assemblies (see especially his monography On the role of Novgorod the Great in the Russian history (Russian: О значении Великого Новгорода в русской истории), and the later Zaporozhian Cossack brotherhood, which he thought in part was an heir to the democratic system as well. By contrast, he was critical of the old autocracy in the Grand Duchy of Moscow. Kostomarov gained some popular notoriety in his day by doubting the story of Ivan Susanin, a legendary martyr hero viewed as a saviour of the Tsardom of Russia (see: Ivan Susanin. Historical review Russian: Иван Сусанин (Историческое исследование)). Kostomarov was interested in the history of the insurgent leaders in Russia. His detailed writing on the case of Stepan Razin, one of the most popular figures in the history of the Don Cossack Host, was particularly important for the political evolution of Narodniks.

== Kostomarov vs. Pogodin ==
Kostomarov maintained a long-standing argument with Mikhail Pogodin regarding the linguistic and ethnographic origin of the word "Rus'". Kostomarov refused the fact that the name Rus' comes into Slavic area from Scandinavia, while Pogodin claimed that the first Rus' people came from Roslagen in the area of present-day Sweden. Pogodin connected the etnonym Rus' with Scandinavia with respect to the Trade route from the Varangians to the Greeks. On the contrary linked Kostomarov the etnonym Rus' with East Slavic oecumene. The argument between Kostomarov and Pogodin about the origin of Rus' had an influence on the building of two different historiographical schools in Russia: the so-called ″Normanists″ and ″Anti-Normanists″. Influenced by this argument between Pogodin and Kostomarov, which took place at the Moscow Imperial University, Prince Pyotr Vyazemsky said: ″If we didn't know before which way we were going, now we don't know from where we are going as well″.

== Religion ==
Kostomarov was a very religious man and a devout adherent of the Russian Orthodox Church. He was critical of Catholic and Polish influences on the area of Ukraine and Belarus throughout the centuries, but, nevertheless, was considered as more open to Catholic culture than many of his Russian contemporaries, and later, the members of the Slavic Benevolent Societies.

== Cultural politics ==
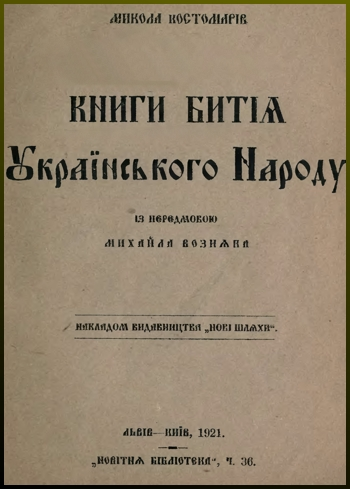
In the Books of the Genesis of the Ukrainian People, Kostomarov set out the principals of the Brotherhood of Saints Cyril and Methodius. Some experts e.g. Myroslav Trofymuk question the authorship of this text.

He was considered by many to be a leading intellectual of the Narodniks. Mykola Kostomarov was important in the history of both Russian and Ukrainian culture. The question of whether he was more "Russian" or more "Ukrainian" first arose while he was still alive and is still a matter of some dispute. Kostomarov was active in cultural politics in the Russian Empire being a proponent of a Pan-Slavic and federalized political system. He was a major personality in the Ukrainian national movement, a friend of the poet Taras Shevchenko, a defender of the Ukrainian language in literature and in the schools, and a proponent of a populist form of Pan-Slavism, a popular movement in a certain part of the Russian intelligentsia of his time. In the 1840s, he helped to found an illegal political organization called the Brotherhood of Saints Cyril and Methodius in Kiev (for which he suffered arrest, imprisonment, and the exile to Saratov). From 1847 to 1854 Kostomarov, whose interest in the history of Little Russia and its literature made him suspected of separatist views, wrote nothing, having been banished to Saratov, and forbidden to teach or publish. But after this time his literary activity began again, and, besides separate works, the leading Russian reviews, such as Old and New Russia, The Historical Messenger, and The Messenger of Europe, contained many contributions from his pen of the highest value.

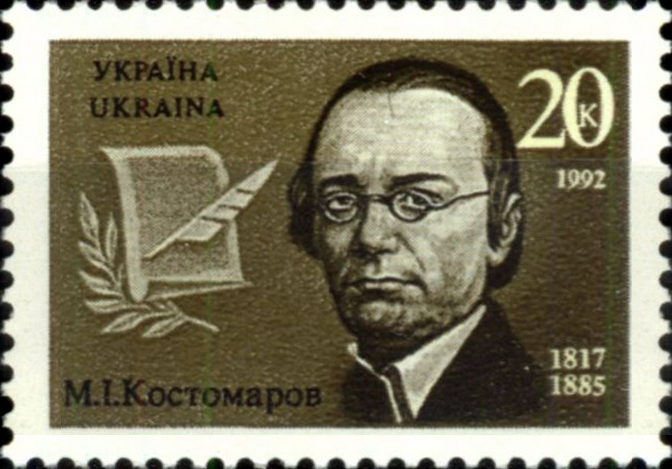
1992 Postage Stamp of Kostomarov

In 1862, he was forced to resign from his post as chair of department of history of the University of Saint Petersburg, because he had sympathized with the revolutionary movement of liberals, progressives, and socialists.

After his arrests, he continued to promote the ideas of federalism and populism in Ukrainian and Russian historical thought. He had a profound influence on later Ukrainian historians such as Volodymyr Antonovych and Mykhailo Hrushevsky.

== Writer ==
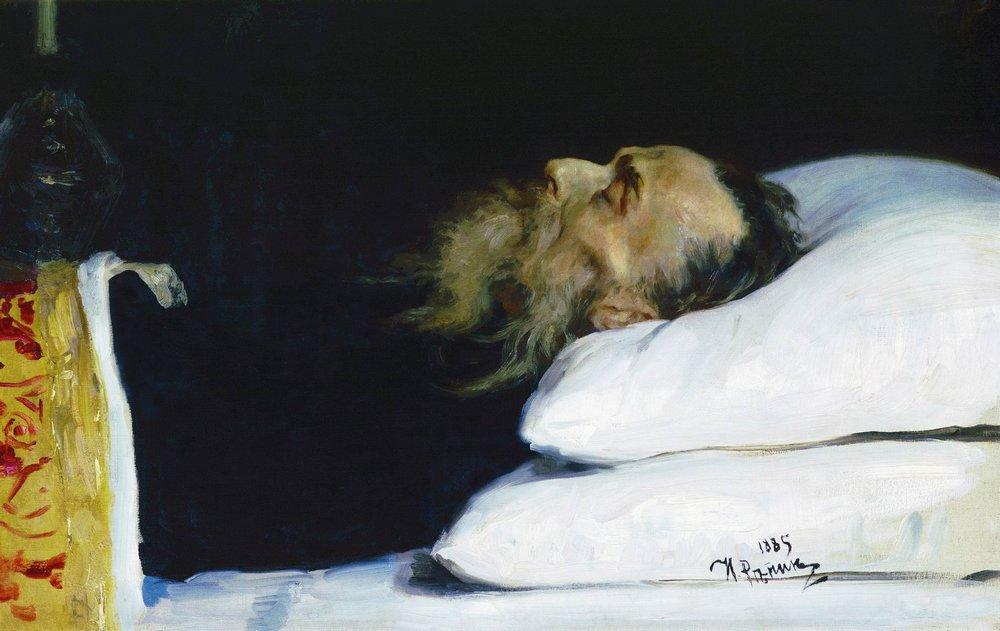
Kostomarov in His Coffin (by Ilya Repin)

Kostomarov was also a romantic author and poet, a member of the Kharkiv Romantic School. He published two poetry collections under the pseudonym Yeremiia Halka, Ukrainski baliady (Ukrainian Ballads, 1839) and Vitka (The Branch, 1840), both containing historical poems mostly about Kievan Rus' and Bohdan Khmelnytsky. He also published a detailed analysis of the Great Russian folksongs. Kostomarov's poetry is known for including vocabulary and other elements of traditional elements and folk songs, which he collected and observed in his historical research with respect to ethnography.

Kostomarov also wrote historical dramas, however these had little influence on the development of the theater. He also wrote a novelette in Russian (Kudeyar, 1875), and a Russian mixed with Ukrainian pice (Chernigovka, 1881), but these also are considered still less significant.

== Works ==
=== History and culture ===
- Nikolai Kostomarov, Russian History in Biographies of its main figures (Русская история в жизнеописаниях её главнейших деятелей), in Russian, available online;
- Nikolai Kostomarov, On the role of Novgorod the Great in the Russian history (О значении Великого Новгорода в русской истории), in Russian, available online;
- Nikolai Kostomarov, Two Russian Nationalities (Две русские народности), in Russian, available online;
- Nikolai Kostomarov, Some thoughts on the Problem of Federalism in Old Rus' (Мысли о федеративном начале в Древней Руси);
- Nikolai Kostomarov, Great Russian folksongs. Based on the new published materials (Великорусская народная песенная поэзия. По вновь изданным материалам), in Russian, available online;
- Nikolai Kostomarov, Ivan Susanin. Historical review (Иван Сусанин (Историческое исследование)), in Russian, available online;
- Nikolai Kostomarov, Time of Troubles in the History of the Tsardom of Moscow (Смутное время Московского государства), in Russian, available online;
- Nikolai Kostomarov, Southern Russia at the End of the 16th Century (Южная Русь в конце XVI века), in Russian, available online;
- Nikolai Kostomarov, Northern Russians and their rools during the time of veche. History of Novgorod, Pskov and Vyatka (Севернорусские народоправства во времена удельно-вечевого уклада (история Новгорода, Пскова и Вятки)), in Russian, available online;
- Nikolai Kostomarov, On the Russian history as reflected in geography and ethnography (Об отношении русской истории к географии и этнографии), in Russian, available online.

=== Fiction ===
- Nikolai Kostomarov, The Farm Animals’ Revolt (Скотской бунт), 1917, in Russian
