= Pavlo Chubynskyi =

Ukrainian poet and ethnographer (1839–1884)

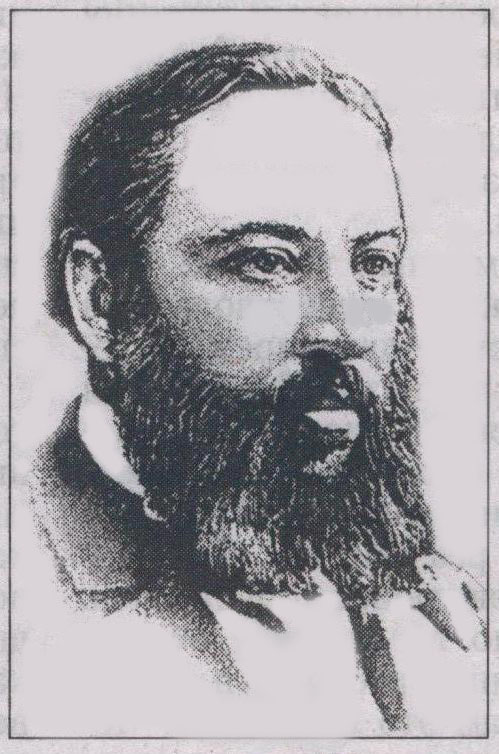

Pavlo Platonovych Chubynskyi (Note: Ukrainian: Павло Платонович Чубинський, IPA: [pɐwˈlɔ plɐˈtɔnowɪtʃ tʃʊˈbɪnʲsʲkɪj].) (1839 – January 26, 1884), also anglicized as Paul Chubinsky, was a Ukrainian poet and ethnographer, best known as the author of the lyrics to the national anthem of Ukraine, set to music by Mykhailo Verbytskyi.

== Birthplace ==
Chubynskyi was born in the Chubynskyi's estate that was located just outside village Hora, Pereiaslav county, Poltava Governorate. Today the place is known as a separate village Chubynske, Boryspil Raion that is located midway between Kyiv and Boryspil International Airport in the Kyiv Oblast.

== Career ==
=== Ukrainian national anthem ===
In 1863 the Lvivan nationalist journal Meta published "Šče ne vmerla Ukrainy ni slava, ni volia" (lit. 'The Glory and Will of Ukraine Has Not Yet Perished'), but mistakenly ascribed it to Taras Shevchenko. In the same year it was set to music by the Galician composer Mykhailo Verbytsky, first for solo and later choral performance.

This song was disseminated throughout Ukraine as a rallying point for nationalist sentiments, leading Pavlo Chubynskyi to be seen as "negatively influencing peasants' minds" by the government of the Russian Empire. They sought to neutralize his influence with assignments that isolated him, first to northern and cold Russian province Arkhangelsk. When his work in that region was recognized internationally by his peers, Chubynskyi was sent to Saint Petersburg to work in the Transport Ministry as a low-level official. He became paralyzed in 1880 and died four years later.

==== Legacy ====
In 1917 the song with his lyrics was officially adopted as the national anthem of Ukraine. In 2003, the president of Ukraine modified its lyrics.
