= Zdenka =

Zdenka or Zdeňka (Czech pronunciation: [ˈzdɛɲka]) is a feminine given name in Croatian, Czech, Slovak, Serbian, and Slovenian languages, meaning "woman from Sidon". It is a diminutive form of Zdena, which was originally a short form of Zdeslava. Denny can be used as a diminutive. The masculine counterparts are Zdenko and Zdeněk. Notable people with the name include:

== Arts ==
- Zdenka Badovinac (born 1958), Slovenian art critic
- Zdeňka Baldová (1885–1958), Czech actress
- Zdenka Bergrová (1923–2008), Czech poet and translator
- Zdeňka Bezděková (1907–1999), Czech writer, philosopher, and translator
- Zdenka Braunerová (1858–1934), Czech painter
- Zdeňka Deitchová (born 1928), Czech animator
- Zdenka Fantlová (1922–2022), Czech actor, writer and Holocaust survivor
- Zdenka Faßbender (1879–1954), Czech-German operatic soprano
- Zdenka Hásková (1878–1946), Czech translator, journalist and writer
- Zdenka Kabátová-Táborská (born 1933), Czech painter, printmaker and illustrator
- Zdenka Kovačiček (born 1944), Croatian singer
- Zdenka Predná (born 1984), Slovak singer
- Zdenka Procházková (1926–2021), Czech actress
- Zdenka Rubinstein (1911–1961), Croatian operatic soprano
- Zdenka Ticharich (1900–1979), Hungarian pianist
- Zdeňka Žádníková-Volencová (born 1974), Czech actress and musician
- Zdenka Žebre (1920–2011), Slovenian writer
- Zdenka Ziková (1902–1990), Czech opera singer

== Sports ==
- Zdenka Bujnáčková (born 1955), Slovak gymnast
- Zdenka Cerar (1941–2013), Slovenian gymnast
- Zdenka Gašparac (born 1949), Croatian swimmer
- Zdenka Grossmannová (born 1965), Czech canoer
- Zdeňka Honsová (1927–1994), Czech gymnast
- Zdenka Hradilová (1938–2023), Czech canoer
- Zdeňka Málková (born 1975), Czech tennis player
- Zdeňka Šilhavá (born 1954), Czech athlete
- Zdeňka Vejnarová (born 1981), Czech biathlete
- Zdeňka Veřmiřovská (1913–1997), Czech artistic gymnast

== Other ==
- Zdenka Buben (1895–1988), American public health social worker
- Zdenka Kramplová (born 1957), Slovak politician
- Zdenka Nemeškalová-Jiroudková (1928–2023), Czech numismatist and archaeologist
- Zdeňka Podkapová (born 1977), Czech model
- Zdeňka Pokorná (1905–2007), Czech teacher
- Zdenka Samish (1904–2008), Czech-Israeli food technology researcher
- Zdeňka Vávrová (born 1945), Czech astronomer
- Zdenka Vučković (1942–2020), Croatian singer
- Zdeňka Wiedermannová-Motyčková (1868–1915), Czech teacher, journal editor and women's rights activist

== Fictional ==
- Zdenka, fictional character in the opera Arabella

== See also ==
- 3364 Zdenka, an asteroid named for Zdeňka Vávrová
