= Zdeněk =

Zdeněk is a Czech male given name derived from the Latin name Sidonius. Jan Svoboda (linguist) contested the relation with the Latin name, and an alternative etymology is a diminutive of Zdeslav.

The South Slavic counterpart is Zdenko. The feminine counterpart is Zdenka.

== People with this name ==
- Zdeněk Adamec (born 1956), javelin thrower who represented Czechoslovakia
- Zdeněk Altner (1947–2016), Czech lawyer and advocate
- Zdeněk Bárta (1891–1987), Bohemian Olympic fencer
- Jan Zdeněk Bartoš (1908–1981), Czech composer
- Zdeněk Bažant (born 1937), Professor at Northwestern University's Robert R. McCormick School of Engineering and Applied Science
- Zdeněk Blatný (born 1981), Czech professional ice hockey left wing
- Zdeněk Bohutínský (born 1946), Czechoslovak sprint canoeist
- Zdeněk Bradáč (born 1981), Czech illusionist, magician, escapologist, juggler and record-breaker
- Zdeněk Burian (1905–1981), Czech painter, paleoartist and book illustrator
- Zdeněk Černický (1914–?), Czechoslovak canoeist
- Zdeněk Doležal (born 1931), pair skater who competed for Czechoslovakia
- Zdeněk Fibich (1850–1900), Czech composer of classical music
- Zdeněk Fierlinger (1891–1976), Czech politician
- Zdeněk Fifka, Czechoslovak slalom canoeist who competed in the mid-1960s
- Zdeněk Folprecht (composer), Czech conductor
- Zdeněk Folprecht (footballer) (born 1991), professional Czech football player
- Zdeněk Frolík (1933–1989), Czech mathematician
- Zdeněk Groessl (1941–2023), Czech former volleyball player
- Zdeněk Grygera (born 1980), Czech football player
- Zdeněk Hedrlín (1933–2018), Czech mathematician
- Zdeněk Hnát (born 1935), Czech classical pianist
- Zdeněk Hruška (born 1954), former Czechoslovak footballer and football manager
- Zdeněk Humhal (1933–2015), Czech former volleyball player
- Zdeněk Chalabala (1899–1962), Czech conductor
- Zdeněk Jarkovský (1918–1948), ice hockey player for the Czechoslovak national team
- Zdeněk Jirotka (1911–2003), Czech writer of radio-broadcast plays and author of humorous novels, short stories, feuilletons
- Zdeněk Kalista (1900–1982), Czech historian, poet, literary critic, and editor
- Zdeněk Konečný (1936–2025), Czech basketball player
- Zdeněk Kopal (1914–1993), Czech astronomer who mainly worked in England
- Zdeněk Košler (1928–1995), Czech conductor
- Zdeněk Koukal (born 1984), Czech football player
- Zdeněk Kovář (1917–2004), Czech industrial designer
- Zdeněk Kroča (born 1980), Czech footballer
- Zdeněk Kroupa (1921–1999), Czech operatic bass singer
- Zdeněk Kubica (born 1986), Czech ice hockey player
- Zdeněk Kudrna (1946–1982), international speedway rider
- Zdeněk Kutlák (born 1980), Czech ice hockey player
- Zdeněk Lenhart (born 1948), orienteering competitor who competed for Czechoslovakia
- Zdeněk Liška (1922–1983), Czech composer who produced a large number of film scores
- Zdeněk Lukáš (1928–2007), prolific Czech composer having composed over 330 works
- Zdeněk Mácal (1936–2023), Czech conductor
- Zdeněk Matějka (1937–2006), Czech chemist known for his contributions to development of ion exchange
- Zdeněk Matějček (1922–2004), Czech children's psychologist and researcher
- Zdeněk Měšťan (born 1944), Czechoslovak slalom canoeist
- Zdeněk Miler (February 21, 1921 - November 30, 2011), Czech animator and illustrator best known for his Mole character and its adventures
- Zdeněk Mlynář (1930–1997), Czech intellectual
- Zdeněk Moravec, Czech astronomer
- Zdeněk Nedvěd (born 1975), professional ice hockey player
- Zdeněk Nehoda (born 1952), Czech football forward
- Zdeněk Nejedlý (1878–1962), Czech musicologist, music critic, author, and politician
- Zdeněk Neubauer (1942–2016), Czech philosopher and biologist
- Zdeněk Opočenský (1896–1975), Czech gymnast
- Zdeněk Otava (1902–1980), Czech operatic baritone
- Zdeněk Pazdírek (born 1953), former Czechoslovak figure skater
- Zdeněk Pecka (1954–2024), Czech rower
- Zdeněk Podskalský (1923–1993), Czech film director and screenwriter
- Zdeněk Pololáník (1935–2024), Czech contemporary composer
- Zdeněk Pospěch (born 1978), Czech footballer
- Zdeněk Rohlíček (born 1980), Czech actor known especially for his stage work
- Zdeněk Rygel (born 1951), former football player from Czechoslovakia
- Zdeněk Sádecký (1925–1971), Czech musicologist
- Zdeněk Simota (born 1985), currently rides in the Czech ExtraLeague with AK Plzeň
- František Zdeněk Skuherský (1830–1892), Czech composer, pedagogue, and theoretician
- Zdeněk Srstka (1935–2019), Czech actor, stunt and weightlifter
- Zdeněk Svoboda (born 1972), former professional footballer
- Zdeněk Svěrák (born 1936), Czech actor, humorist and scriptwriter
- Zdeněk Šafář (born 1978), Czech freestyle skier who specializes in skicross
- Zdeněk Ščasný (born 1957), Czech football manager and former player
- Zdeněk Šenkeřík (born 1980), Czech football striker
- Zdeněk Škára (1950–2010), Czechoslovak handball player
- Zdeněk Škrland (1914–1996), Czechoslovak sprint canoeist
- Zdeněk Šmejkal (born 1988), professional Czech football player
- Zdeněk Špinar (1916–1995), Czech paleontologist and author
- Zdeněk Štěpánek (1896–1968), Czech actor
- Zdeněk Štybar (born 1985), Czech professional cyclo-cross cyclist
- Zdeněk Tylšar (1945–2006), Czech player of the French horn
- Zdeněk Tůma (born 1960), Czech economist, former Governor of the Czech National Bank
- Zdeněk Valenta, Czechoslovak slalom canoeist
- Zdeněk Vávra (1891–1947), Olympic fencer, competed for Bohemia in 1912 and Czechoslovakia in 1920
- Zdeněk Veselovský (1928–2006), important Czech zoologist
- Zdeněk Vítek (born 1977), Czech biathlete
- Zdeněk Zeman (born 1947), Czech-Italian football coach
- Zdeněk Ziegler, multiple people
- Zdeněk Zlámal (born 1985), Czech football goalkeeper

== See also ==
- Mole (Zdeněk Miler character), animated character in cartoons by Czech animator Zdeněk Miler
