= Zdenko =

- Gender: Male

Origin
- Origin: Slavic
- Meaning: well; builder; from Sidon; diminutive of Zdeslav or Zdeněk

Other names
- Variant forms: Zdenka (f), Zdeňka (f), Zdeno, Denny (diminiuitiv)
- Related names: Zdeněk, Zdzisław

Zdenko is a male given name of Slovak, Slovene or Croatian origin. There are a number of competing explanations for the meaning of the name:

- the slavic term zdenac, meaning a well
- from the slavic term zidati, meaning to build or to create
- Slavic version of the name Sidonius (meaning of Sidon)
- as a diminutive of the given names Zdeslav or Zdeněk.

There are also claims connecting it to the name Sidney. Denny can be used as a short form (hypocorism) of the name. The female form is Zdenka/Zdeňka.

== People with this name ==
- Zdenko Adamović, Croatian football manager and player
- Zdenko Babić, Croatian basketball player
- Zdenko Balaš, Croatian rower
- Zdenko Baotić, Bosnian footballer
- Zdenko Bego, Yugoslav rower
- Zdenko Feyfar, Czech photographer
- Zdenko Frťala, Slovak football manager and player
- Zdenko Hibšer, Croatian handballer
- Zdenko Jedvaj, Bosnian footballer
- Zdenko Jelčić, Croatian actor
- Zdenko Jurčević, Croatian footballer
- Zdenko Kaprálik, Slovak footballer
- Zdenko Kobešćak, Croatian footballer
- Zdenko Kolar, Serbian bass guitarist
- Zdenko Kožul, Croatian chess grandmaster
- Zdenko Križić, Archbishop of Split
- Zdenko Lobkowitz, Austrian nobleman and officer
- Zdenko Miletić, Croatian footballer
- Zdenko Morovic, Venezuelan footballer
- Zdenko Muf, Serbian football manager and player
- Zdenko Runjić, Croatian songwriter
- Zdenko Seselja, Australian politician
- Zdenko Škrabalo, Croatian physician and politician
- Zdenko Hans Skraup, Czech-Austrian chemist
- Zdenko Strižić, Croatian architect
- Zdenko Švigelj, Slovenian skier
- Zdenko Trebuľa, President of the Košice Self-governing Region since 2006
- Zdenko Uzorinac, Croatian table tennis player
- Zdenko Verdenik, Slovenian football manager
- Zdenko Vinski, Croatian archeologist
- Zdenko "Denny" Vrandečić, Croatian computer scientist
- Zdenko Vukasović, Croatian footballer
- Zdenko Zorko, Croatian handball player

== See also ==
- Slavic names
