= The Heretic (poem) =

1845 Ukrainian poem

The Heretic (Ukrainian: Єретик, romanized: Yeretyk) is a historical poem by Ukrainian poet Taras Shevchenko, written in 1845 and first published in 1861 in the magazine Osnova. The text concerns itself with the emergence of the Hussite movement in Bohemia and glorifies the figure of the Czech religious reformer Jan Hus, describing his opposition to the Holy See and his resulting martyrous death during the Council of Constance. The poem is dedicated to Slovak poet, historian and linguist Pavel Šafárik.

== Creation and publication ==
The main part of the poem was finished by Shevchenko in October 1845 in Maryinske near Pyriatyn. The introduction with the dedication to Šafárik was finished in late November of the same year in Pereyaslav. A pioneering Slavist whose ideas had a big impact on the Ukrainian national revival, Šafárik regarded Ukrainians as a distinct people with their own language and literature and maintained close ties with Ukrainian authors and scientists, including members of the Ruthenian Triad, as well as Izmail Sreznevsky, Osip Bodyansky and Mykhailo Maksymovych.

It is likely that the creation of the poem was inspired by Shevchenko's conversations with Bodiansky, which awakened his interest in the national liberation movement of Czechs and Slovaks. Czech poet Karel Havlíček Borovský became a close friend of Bodiansky during his stay in Moscow in 1843-1844, and some scholars considered it to be possible that he could have also met Shevchenko during one of his visits to the city. Another influence on the creation of the poem could have been Bodiansky's student Spiridon Palauzov, who in 1845 published an article dedicated to Jan Hus.

According to some of Shevchenko's close friends, the original name of the poem was Jan Hus. In the following year the poem was included into the author's compilation Three Summers (Ukrainian: Три літа), but in the latter period it started to be seen as a separate work. After Shevchenko's arrest in 1847 his close friend Vasyl Tarnovsky hid the original autograph of the poem along with his other works, and it was later lost. After his return from exile in 1857, Shevchenko claimed that only less than half of the poem had been preserved in copies, but the second half was never found.

Part of the poem was published for the first time in Saint Petersburg's Osnova magazine in 1861. In 1876 87 strophas of the poem with the author's corrections were printed in a Prague edition of Kobzar with an afterword by Mykola Kostomarov and Mikhail Mikeshin. The full text of the poem was printed for the first time in 1907 in Saint Petersburg.

== Plot ==
The introduction to the poem allegorically describes the history of relations between Germans and Slavs, which, according to the author, were based on oppression and subjugation of the latter group by the former. Shevchenko mourns the lack of historical memory among the general majority of Slavic populations and praises Šafarik for his studies, which laid the ground for a Slavic national revival. He then presents the figure of Jan Hus as a great Czech patriot, who sacrificed his life for the ideals of Slavic brotherhood.

The main part of the poem starts with a panorama of oppression directed by the Catholic Church against the common people in medieval Europe. Observing the injustice, Jan Hus, the main hero of the poem, goes to pray in the Bethlehem Chapel and asks God for mercy on his people, so that they could be protected from Rome's greed and arbitrariness. To demonstrate his condemnation of the practice of indulgences, Hus publicly tears a Papal bull granting forgiveness to a notable prostitute, which provokes panic both at the Papal court in Rome and at the residence of the Anti-Pope in Avignon.

In order to force Hus to repent for his actions and recognize Papal authority, the Catholic leadership calls up a council at Constance. Despite his supporters pleading him not to go, Hus decides to face his opponents and leaves Prague to meet them. After arriving to the council he is declared a heretic and burned at the stake. During his execution Hus prays to God, pleading for him to forgive his murderers. In the aftermath a group of Czechs arrives to the site of the execution and brings some earth from the site to Prague. In the final scene of the poem, Catholic monks and clergymen feast and drink, believing that after Hus's death there is no more danger for their domination. Meanwhile in Tábor, Jan Žižka raises his mace, calling his compatriots for a war of revenge.

== Analysis ==
According to Dmytro Chyzhevsky, Shevchenko's attraction to the figure of Jan Hus, which inspired him to create the poem, stemmed from the author's deep anthropocentrism and ability to perceive historical personalities as if they were his contemporaries. Religious movements of the past are seen by Shevchenko not as isolated episodes, but as elements of the general struggle for human freedom.

The poem uses Biblical symbols, for instance comparing Šafárik, the leader of Slavic cultural revival, to prophet Ezekiel, who was given power to resurrect the dead. Epigraph to the main part of the poem is taken from the Psalms and compares the main hero to a grounding stone, around which the ideas of both Czech National Revival and Protestantism emerged. Shevchenko also uses sea, into which different rivers flow, as a symbol of Slavic unity, which was a widespread trope used by Slavophiles. Hus is compared by the author to a goose (which is the meaning of his surname in Czech language), his condemners from among the Catholic clergy are depicted as crows, Holy Roman Emperor Sigismund is likened to a snake (a symbol for Satan) and Hus' follower Martin Luther – to an eagle.

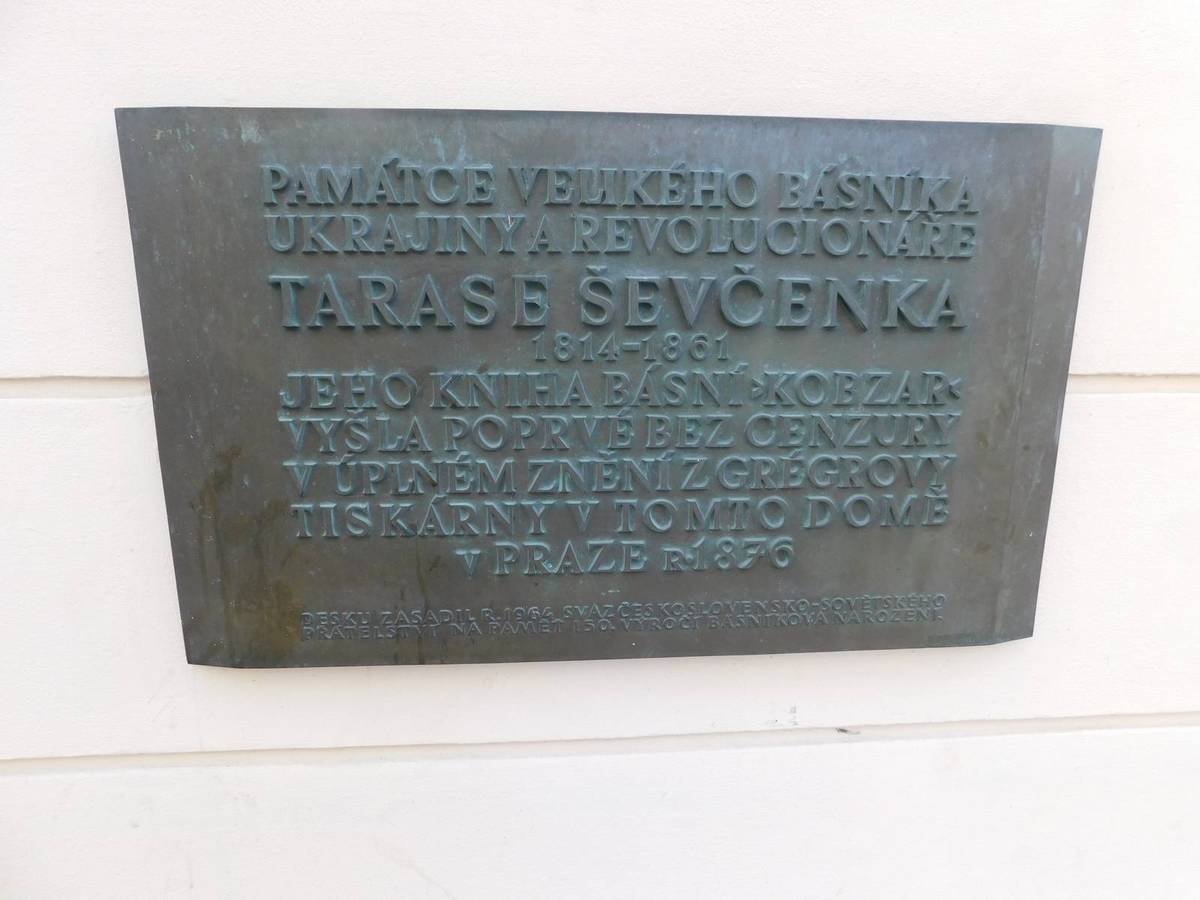
Memorial plaque on a building in Prague, where the poem was printed along with the first uncensored version of the Kobzar in 1876

== Legacy ==
With the rise Shevchenko's popularity in Slavic countries following his death in 1861, his poem dedicated to Jan Hus became known in Czech press, with its first mention being made by Národní Listy in 1863. An excerpt from the poem was published in an 1866 article by the Czech Květy magazine. According to the article's publisher, Shevchenko had personally sent a copy of his work to Šafárik, but it was lost. During the Second World War the poem was used in anti-German propaganda by Czechoslovak Communists.

== Translations ==
In 1863 a Czech translation of the foreword to the poem with an address to Pavel Šafárik was made by Josef Václav Frič in Paris. It was later presented at the Umělecká beseda society in Prague. In 1907 a Czech translation of the poem was created in Kyiv. In Czechoslovakia itself, translations of the poem were published in 1918 by František Tichý (re-issued in 1919 with a foreword by Stepan Smal-Stotsky), in 1951 by Milan Jariš and in 2005 by Zdenka Bergrová. In 1959 the first full translation of the poem in Slovak language was published.

== In art ==
In 1949, an illustration to the poem was created by Ukrainian artist Vasyl Kasiian, an alumnus of the Prague Academy of Fine Arts.

== Texts of the poem ==
- Тарас Шевченко. Зібрання творів: У 6 т. — К., 2003. — Т. 1: Поезія 1837-1847.— С. 287-296 (Original text)
- Taras Shevchenko's poem "The Heretic" (translated into English by John Weir)

== Sources ==
- Тарас Шевченко. Зібрання творів: У 6 т. — К., 2003. — Т. 1: Поезія 1837-1847.— С.715-723.
- Михайло Мольнар : Тарас Шевченко у чехів та словаків (Michal Molnár : Taras Ševčenko u Čechov a Slovakov)
