= Bradáč =

Bradáč (feminine: Bradáčová) is a Czech surname. It is derived from the word brada, meaning 'chin'. Notable people with the surname include:

- Lenka Bradáčová (born 1973), Czech prosecutor
- Věra Bradáčová (born 1955), Czech athlete
- Vojtěch Bradáč (1913–1947), Czech footballer
- Zdeněk Bradáč (born 1987), Czech illusionist

== See also ==
- Fran Bradač (1885–1970), Slovene classical philologist and translator
