= Táborský =

Táborský (feminine Táborská) is a Czech surname meaning "the person from Tábor". Notable people with the surname include:

- Ivo Táborský (born 1985), Czech footballer
- Miroslav Táborský (born 1959), Czech actor
- Terezie Táborská (born 2006), Czech athlete
- Vladimír Táborský (born 1944), retired Czech football player and coach
- Zdenka Kabátová-Táborská (born 1933), Czech painter, illustrator
- Joseph Taborsky (1924–1960), American murderer and spree killer executed by the state of Connecticut.
