= Poštorná =

- Municipal part of Břeclav
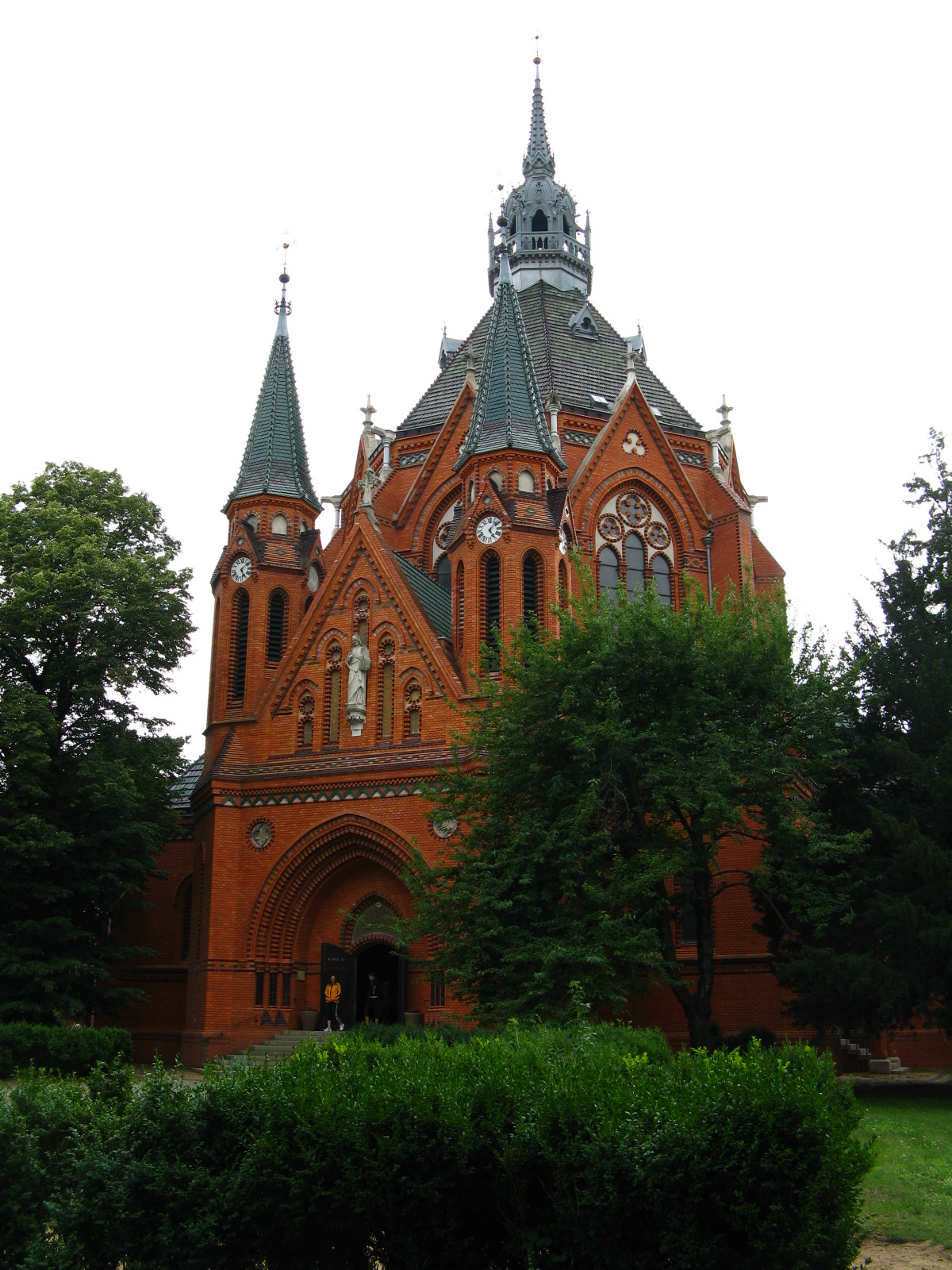
- Church of the Visitation
- Interactive map of Poštorná
- Coordinates: 49°45′00″N 18°51′48″E
- Country: Czech Republic
- Region: South Moravian Region
- District: Břeclav
- Municipality: Břeclav

Area
  - Total: 21.77 km^{2} (8.41 sq mi)

Population (2021)
  - Total: 4,536
  - Density: 208.4/km^{2} (539.7/sq mi)
- Time zone: UTC+1 (CET)
  - Summer (DST): UTC+2 (CEST)
- Postal code: 691 41

Poštorná (German: Unterthemenau) is a municipal part of the town of Břeclav in Břeclav District in the South Moravian region of the Czech Republic.

Former football club SK Tatran Poštorná was based in the district.

== Demographics ==
Historical population

Year	Pop.	±%
1869	1,175	—
1880	1,711	+45.6%
1890	2,639	+54.2%
1900	3,426	+29.8%
1910	3,679	+7.4%
1921	3,860	+4.9%
1930	3,853	−0.2%
1950	3,073	−20.2%

Year	Pop.	±%
1961	3,472	+13.0%
1970	3,682	+6.0%
1980	4,386	+19.1%
1991	5,190	+18.3%
2001	5,304	+2.2%
2011	5,038	−5.0%
2021	4,536	−10.0%

Source: Censuses
