= Břeclav =

- Town
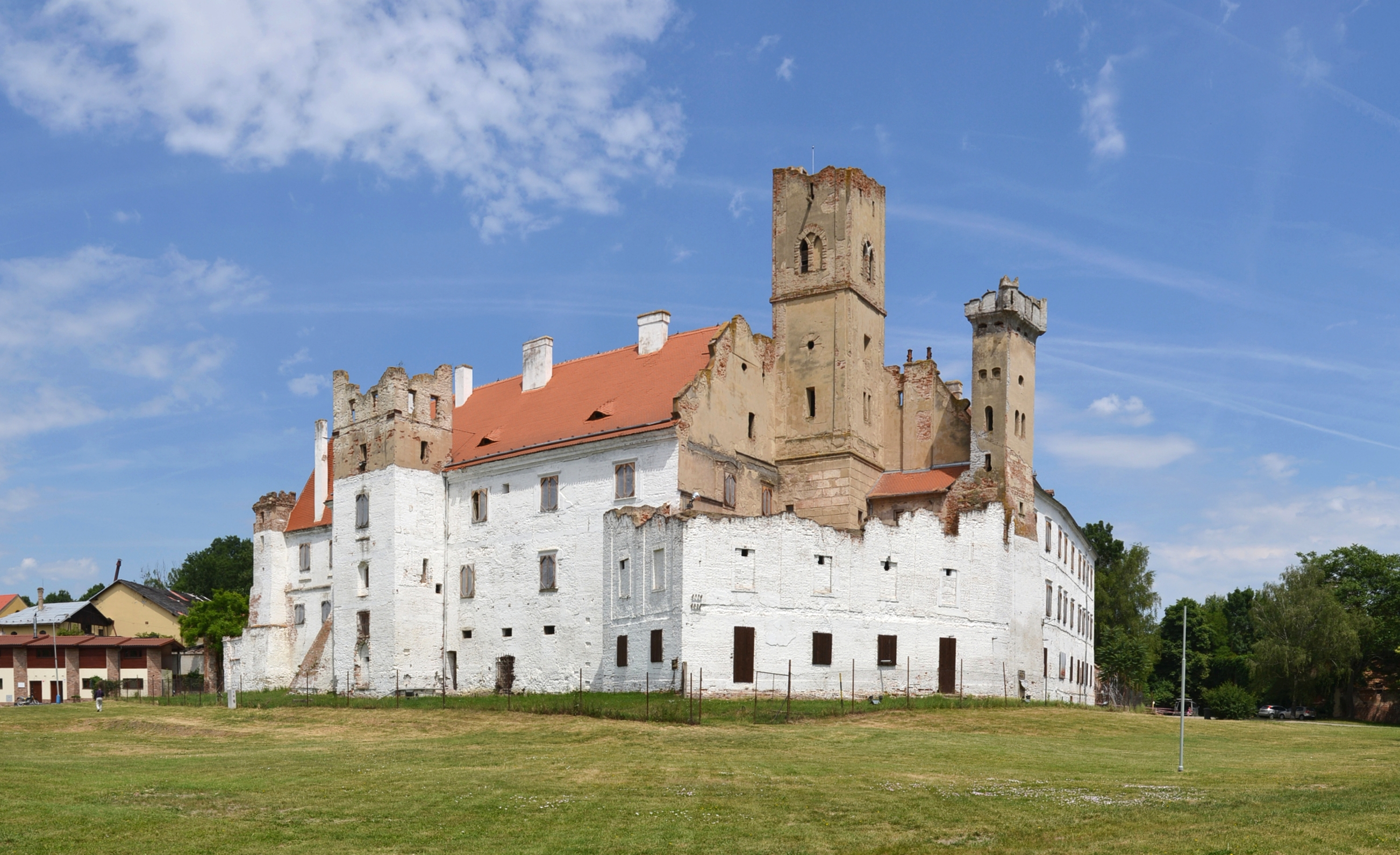
- Břeclav Castle

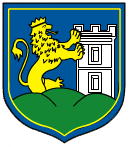
- Flag Coat of arms

- Location in the Czech Republic
- Coordinates: 48°45′32″N 16°52′55″E
- Country: Czech Republic
- Region: South Moravian
- District: Břeclav
- First mentioned: 1056

Government
  - Mayor: Martin Marták (ANO)

Area
  - Total: 77.19 km^{2} (29.80 sq mi)
- Elevation: 158 m (518 ft)

Population (2026-01-01)
  - Total: 24,583
  - Density: 318.5/km^{2} (824.8/sq mi)
- Time zone: UTC+1 (CET)
  - Summer (DST): UTC+2 (CEST)
- Postal code: 690 02
- Website: www.breclav.eu

Břeclav (Czech pronunciation: [ˈbr̝ɛtslaf]; German: Lundenburg) is a town in the South Moravian Region of the Czech Republic. It has about 25,000 inhabitants. The town is located on the Thaya River in the Lower Morava Valley, at the border with Austria and near the border with Slovakia. It is an important railway hub.

For a large part of its feudal history, Břeclav was owned by the Liechtenstein family. The town proper is surrounded by the Lednice–Valtice Cultural Landscape, which is an UNESCO World Heritage Site.

== Administrative division ==
Břeclav consists of three municipal parts (in brackets population according to the 2021 census):

- Břeclav (14,764)
- Charvátská Nová Ves (5,018)
- Poštorná (4,536)

== Etymology ==
The town's name is derived from the Czech name of the founder of the local castle, Duke Bretislav I. The former German name Lundenburg was probably derived from the name of a Slavic tribe which lived in the area, while some have suggested it being based on the name of the Luna forest, which was probably a forest near the Morava river during antiquity.

== Geography ==
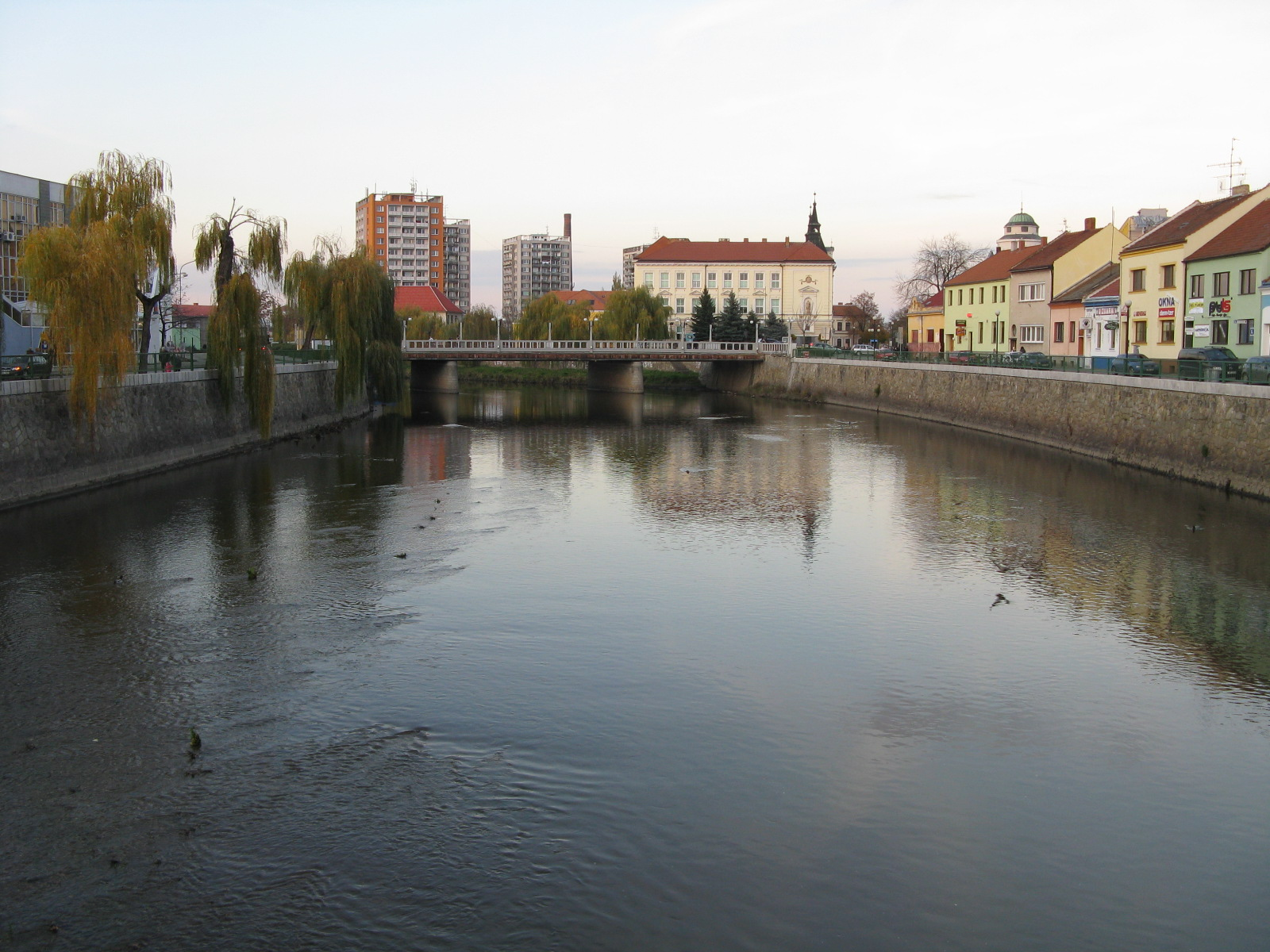
Thaya River in the town centre

Břeclav is located about 50 kilometres (31 mi) southeast of Brno, at the border with Austria. It borders the Austrian town Bernhardsthal. Břeclav lies about 10 km (6 mi) northwest of the Slovak border at Kúty and about 65 km (40 mi) north of the Austrian capital Vienna.

Břeclav lies in the Lower Morava Valley lowland in the warmest part of the country. The Thaya River flows through the town. There is wild thick riparian forest composed of deciduous trees in the southern part of the municipal territory.

== History ==
=== 6th–10th centuries ===
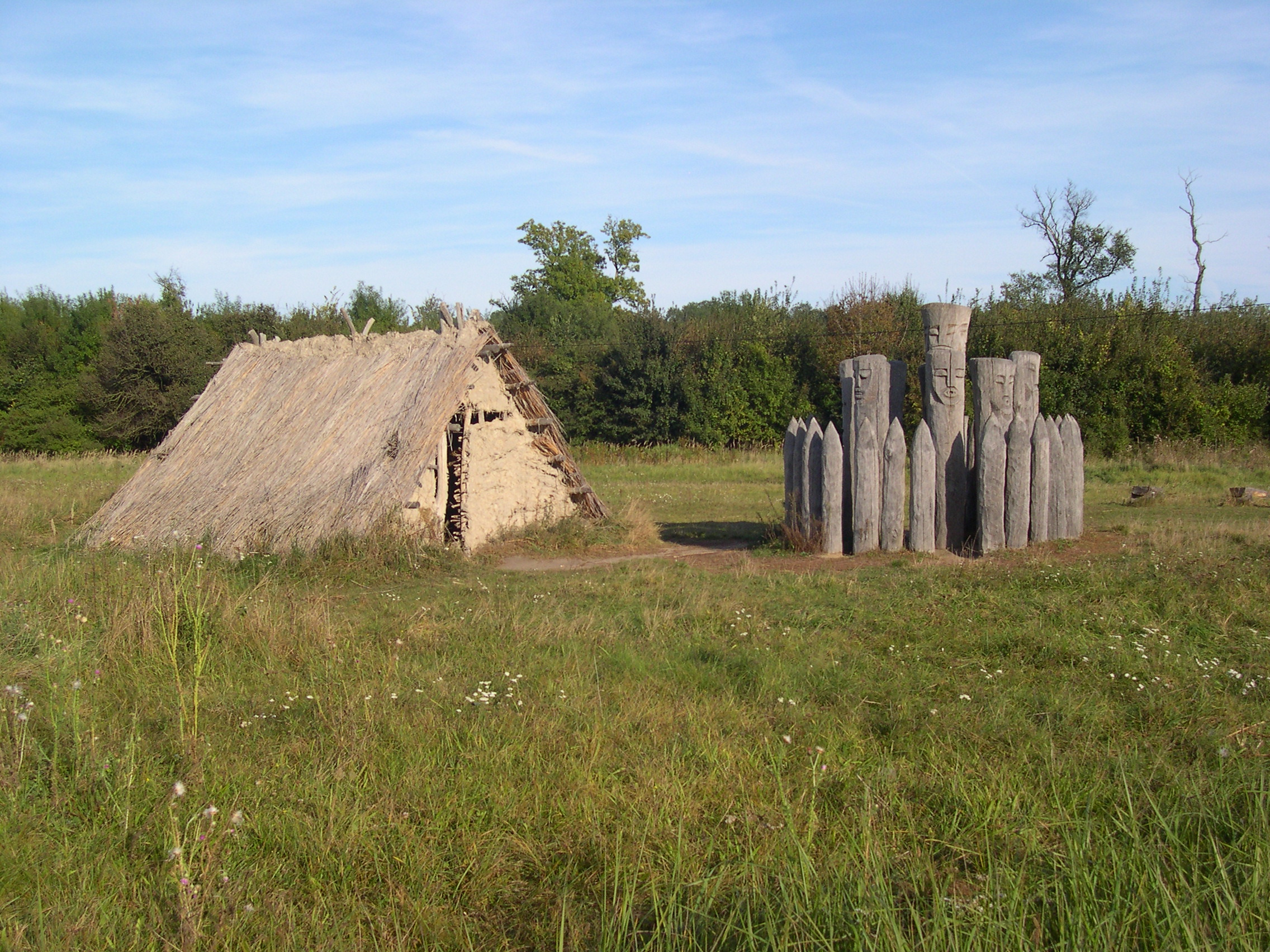
Archaeological site of Pohansko

The area was settled first by Slavic tribes in the 6th century. In the late 8th century, a large Slavic gord, today called Pohansko (meaning 'a paganish place'), was established southeast of today's town. In the 9th century, it became a significant centre of Great Moravia. An agricultural settlement probably existed in the area of Old Břeclav, and the gord served as a hiding place for its inhabitants. It was abandoned in the 10th century.

=== 11th–15th centuries ===
After 1041, a border castle was established here by Duke Bretislav I. The first written mention of Břeclav is from 1046, when it was referred by its Latin name Bretyzlawe. In the second half of the 13th century, the castle was rebuilt to a massive Romanesque fortress. The castle often changed owners. At the beginning of the 15th century, it was acquired by the Liechtenstein family.

During the Hussite Wars, the castle became a military base of the Hussites and the nearby settlement was looted. The inhabitants had to flee and founded a new market town below the castle on the other side of the Thaya river, called Nová Břeclav ('new Břeclav'). The original spot has been called Stará Břeclav ('old Břeclav') since that time.

=== 16th–19th centuries ===
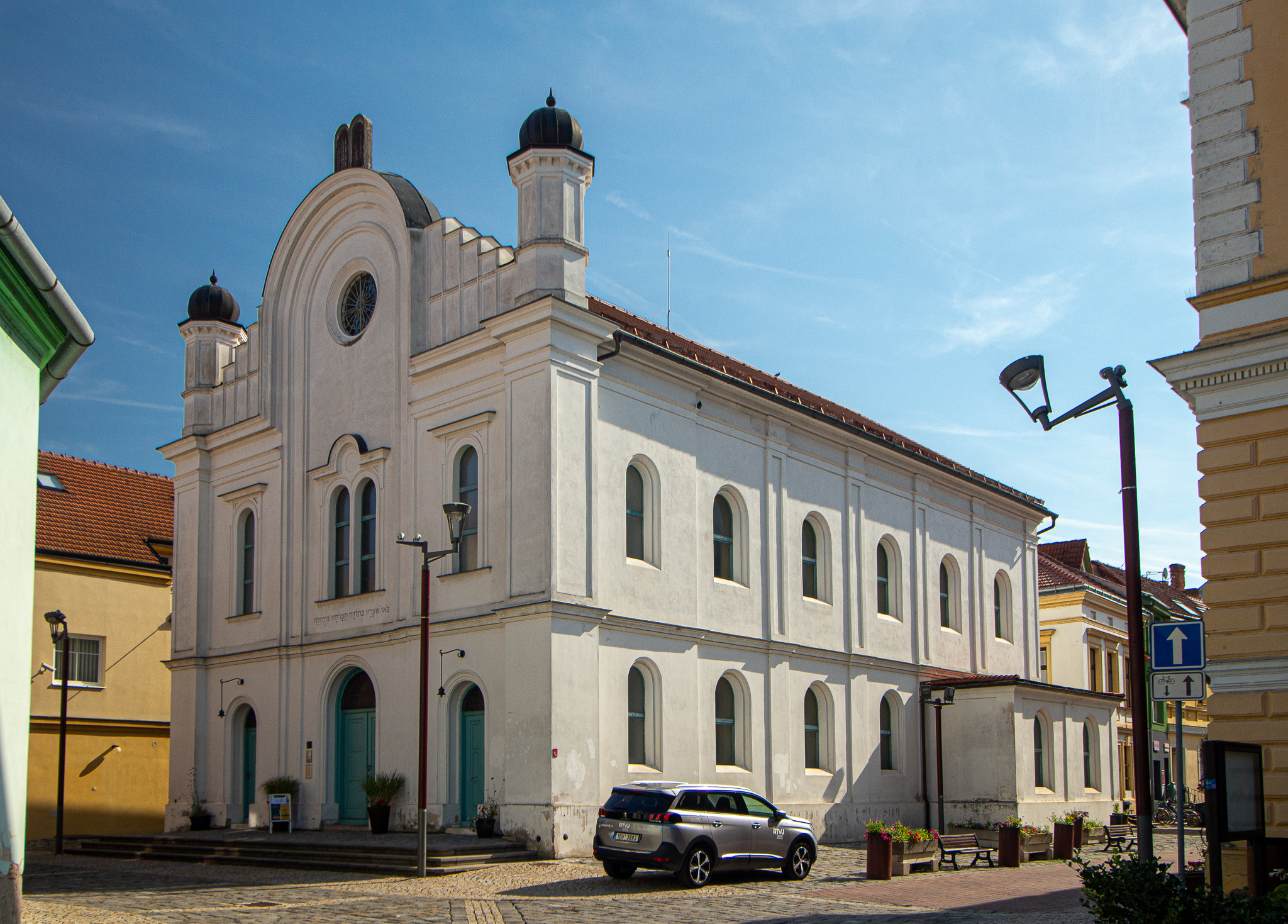
The former synagogue

In 1534, the Břeclav estate was acquired by the Zierotin family. The family rebuilt the castle to a Renaissance residence, which also retained its military function. In the 16th century, the prosperity with flourishing agriculture, crafts and science occurred. The development ended with the Thirty Years' War. After the Battle of White Mountain, the Břeclav estate was confiscated to the Zierotins. In 1638, the Liechtensteins bought the devastated estate.

Břeclav's Jewish community was first documented in the 16th century, although some individual Jews may have arrived earlier, in the 14th or early 15th centuries. The Jewish population became extinct during the Thirty Years' War. New Jewish settlers came in 1650.

The post-war recovery was slow. In 1742, Břeclav was destroyed by a large fire. Until the 1830s, both Břeclav and Old Břeclav were insignificant agricultural small market towns and together had about 3,000 inhabitants. In 1836–1839, the railway from Vienna to Brno was built, initiating economic development. Lumber and food factories were established, and the population began to grow. In 1872, Břeclav was promoted to a town.

The Jewish industrialist Kuffner family played a pivotal role in the development of the town. In 1862, they established a sugar factory that grew to become the largest in Austria-Hungary. The Kuffner family contributed to the town's infrastructure by sponsoring the construction of the Jewish synagogue and cemetery.

=== 20th–21st centuries ===
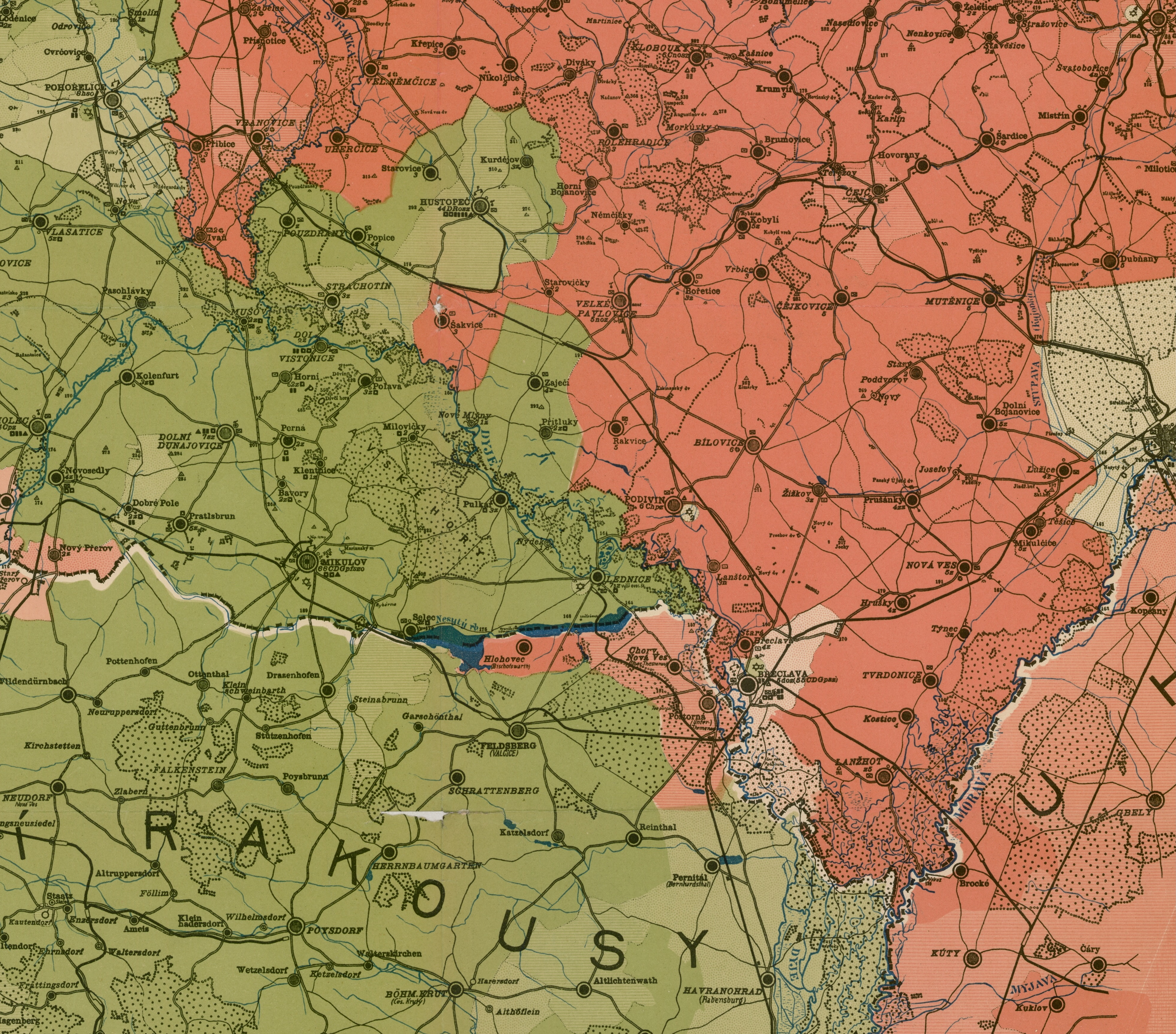
Břeclav with a thin Czech speaking majority (marked red) according to a map from 1906

With the dissolution of Austria-Hungary after World War I, the area (including the neighbouring municipalities of Poštorná and Charvátská Nová Ves, which were mostly Czech speaking, but had been parts of Lower Austria until the 1919 Treaty of Saint-Germain-en-Laye) became part of newly independent Czechoslovakia. In 1919, three formerly separate municipalities merged (Břeclav, Old Břeclav and Jewish Municipality of Břeclav).

From 1938 to 1945, Břeclav was annexed by Nazi Germany. The Jewish community disappeared as a result of the Holocaust. After World War II, the German speaking population was expelled. In 1974, Poštorná and Charvátská Nová Ves were incorporated into the town. From 1976 to 2006, Ladná was also an administrative part of Břeclav.

The northern edge of Břeclav was heavily damaged by the 2021 South Moravia tornado.

== Demographics ==
Historical population

Year	Pop.	±%
1869	6,683	—
1880	9,712	+45.3%
1890	12,014	+23.7%
1900	13,794	+14.8%
1910	16,745	+21.4%

Year	Pop.	±%
1921	18,163	+8.5%
1930	19,454	+7.1%
1950	15,808	−18.7%
1961	17,185	+8.7%
1970	18,870	+9.8%

Year	Pop.	±%
1980	22,671	+20.1%
1991	24,979	+10.2%
2001	25,485	+2.0%
2011	24,737	−2.9%
2021	24,318	−1.7%

Source: Censuses

== Transport ==
The D2 motorway, linking Brno with the Czech–Slovak border and further with Bratislava, runs through the northern part of the town.

Břeclav railway station is an important hub in the railway network. It is located at the intersection of the routes to and from Brno–Prague, Ostrava–Kraków/Katowice (Poland), Kúty–Bratislava (Slovakia) and Hohenau an der March–Vienna (Austria). In addition, a local railway to Znojmo also branches out from the station. There is a rail border crossing Břeclav/Bernhardsthal to Austria.

== Sport ==
Břeclav was known for the professional football club SK Tatran Poštorná. In 1995–2000, it played in the Czech National Football League. In 2012, it was dissolved. Today the town is home to the club MSK Břeclav, playing in lower amateur tiers.

A motorcycle speedway track existed in front of Břeclav Castle. It was constructed in the mid-1960s, but the racing ended due to a ban in 1975.

== Sights ==
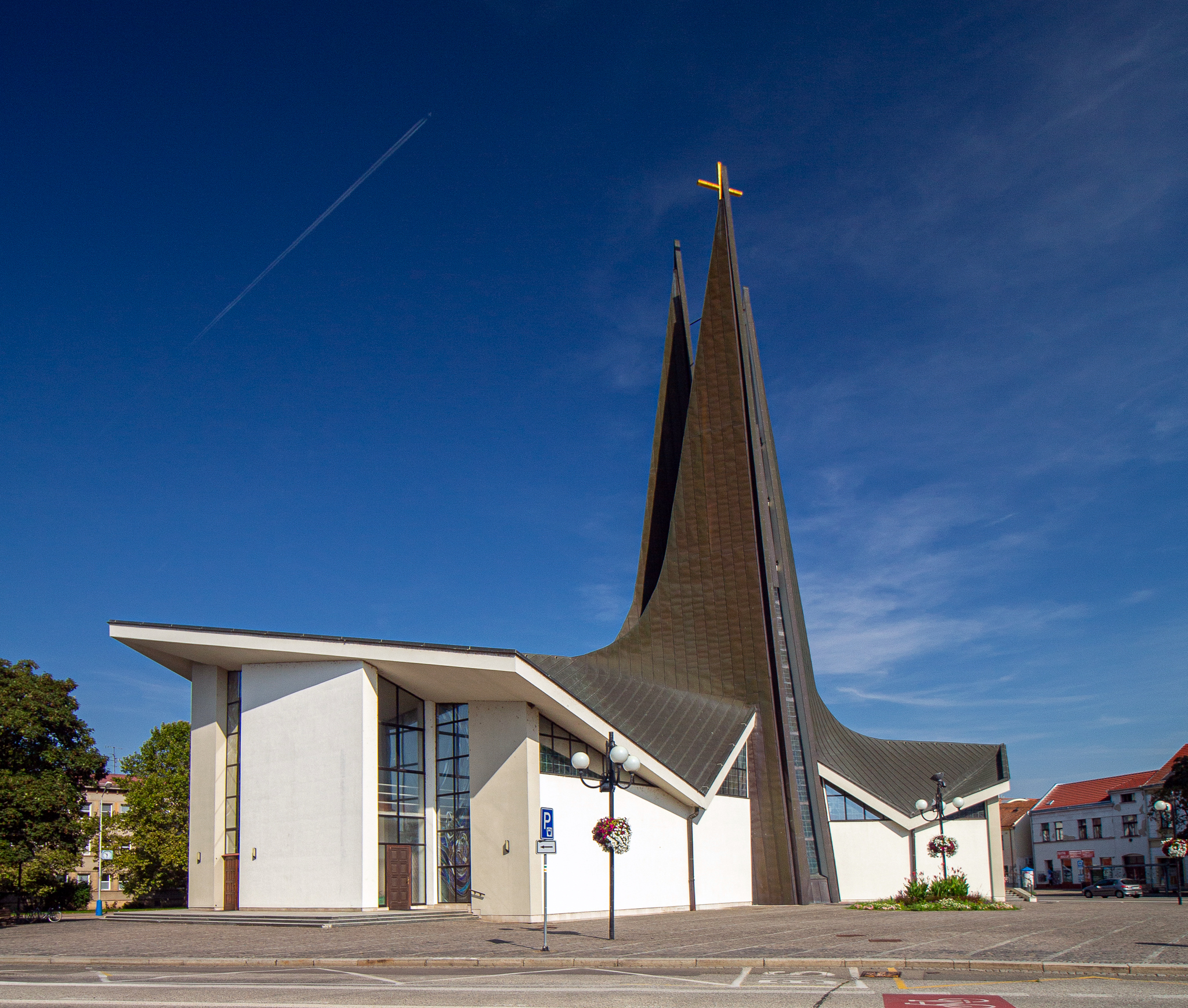
Church of Saint Wenceslaus

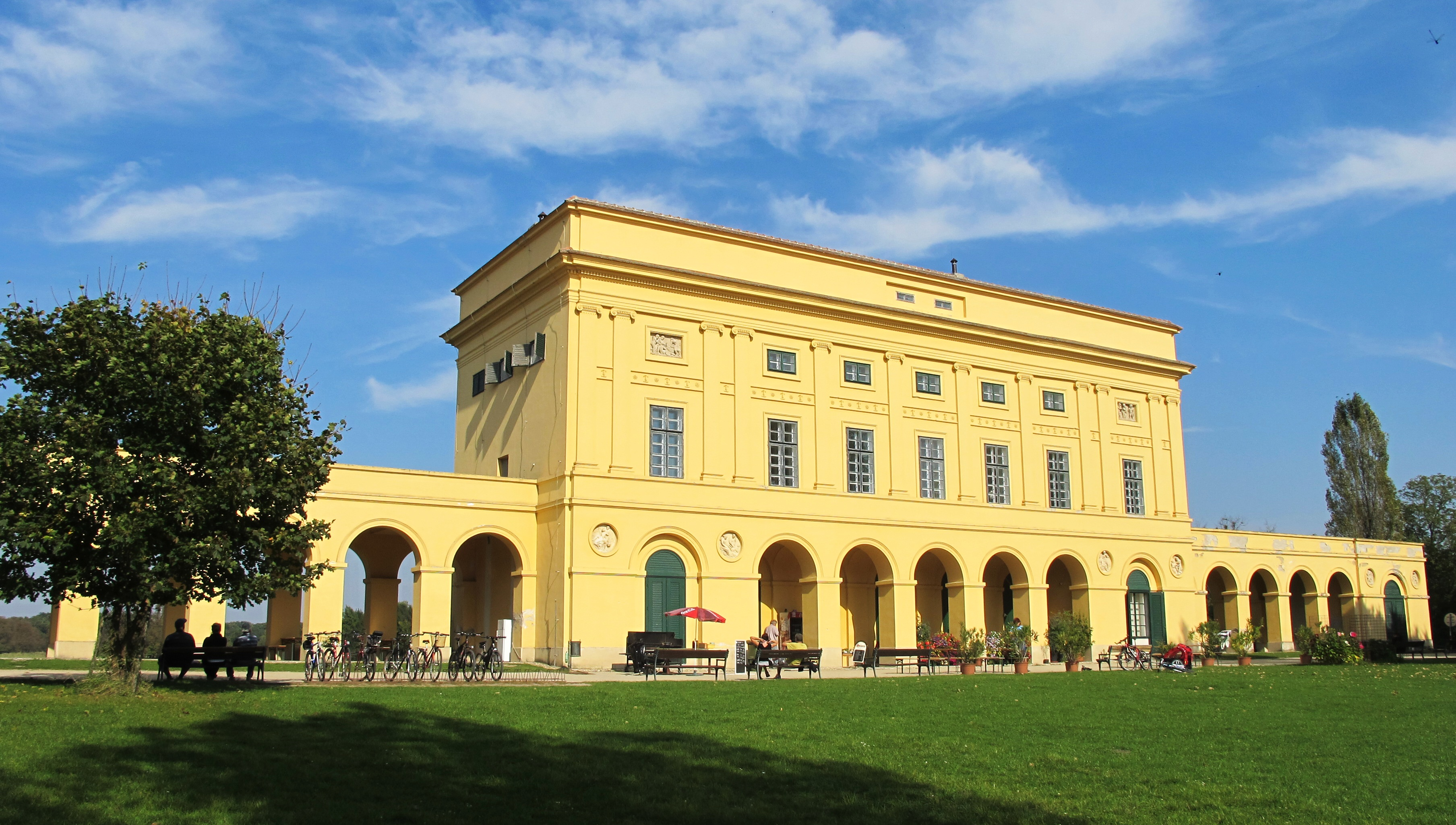
Pohansko Castle

The Břeclav Castle was rebuilt into its current neo-Gothic artificial ruins form in the first half of the 19th century. It was rebuilt by the Liechtensteins during the establishment of Lednice–Valtice Cultural Landscape. Today it is owned by the town. One of its towers serves as an observation tower.

The parish Church of Saint Wenceslaus on the square Náměstí T. G. Masaryka is a contemporary architecture from 1992 to 1995 on the spot of a Baroque one destroyed in World War II. The second parish church is the Church of the Visitation of Our Lady in Poštorná. it is a unique neo-Gothic structure with a cupola built in 1895–1898 with use of special bricks from local factory.

The old small synagogue from 1697 was replaced by a larger building in 1868. In 1888, it was renovated in the neo-Romanesque style and with Moorish Revival elements inside. Nowadays it houses a part of the town museum. The Jewish cemetery was founded in the 17th century. The oldest from the 300 preserved tombstones is from the 18th century. The former Jewish school (today called Liechtenstein's House) in the middle of the former Jewish ghetto serves as a main building of the town's museum and gallery.

The western and southern rural part of Břeclav lies in the Lednice–Valtice Cultural Landscape, which has been a UNESCO World Heritage Site since 1996. One of its main features, located in Břeclav's territory, is the Apollo Temple. It was built by design of Joseph Kornhäusel in 1817–1819.

Lednice–Valtice Cultural Landscape also includes Pohansko, an archaeological site in the middle of the riparian forests from Great-Moravian times. The archaeological findings are presented in the Pohansko Castle. This small hunting castle was built here by the Liechtensteins in the Empire style in 1810–1812. In the Pohansko area is also the small Light Fortification Museum in a renovated bunker.

== Notable people ==
- Julius Lieban (1857–1940), Austro-German operatic tenor
- Rudolf Carl (1899–1987), Austrian actor
- Zdeňka Pokorná (1905–2007), resistance fighter
- František Kobzík (1914–1944), rower and soldier
- Jan Švéda (1931–2007), rower, Olympic medalist
- Václav Pavkovič (1936–2019), rower, Olympic medalist
- Friedrich Kratochwil (born 1944), German political scientist and professor
- Ivan Kučírek (1946–2022), cyclist

== Twin towns – sister cities ==
Břeclav is twinned with:

- Andrychów, Poland
- Brezová pod Bradlom, Slovakia
- Lysá nad Labem, Czech Republic
- Novi Vinodolski, Croatia
- Priverno, Italy
- Trnava, Slovakia

Břeclav also cooperates with Nový Bor in the Czech Republic, Šentjernej in Slovenia and with Zwentendorf in Austria.

== Gallery ==
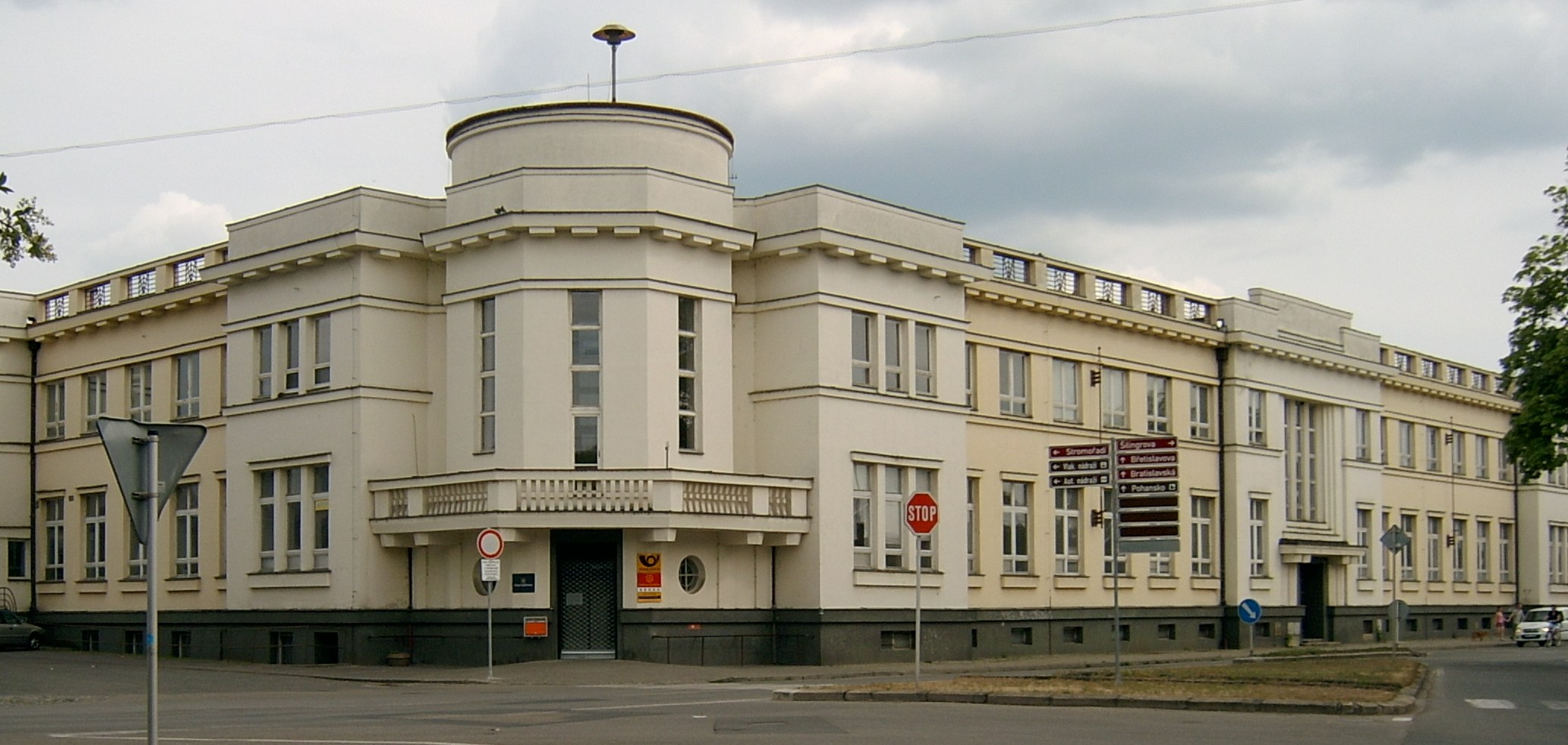
Main post office

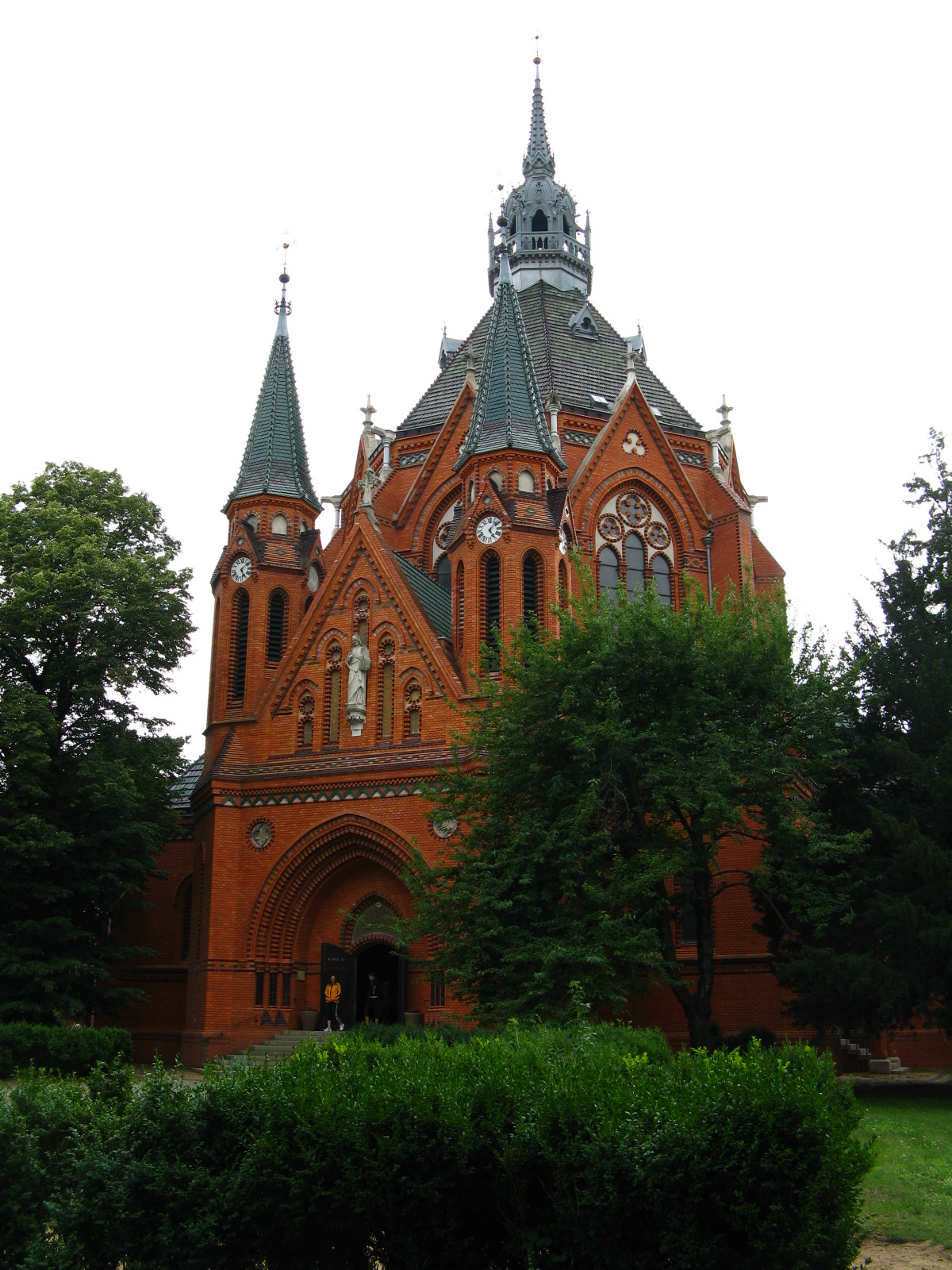
Church of the Visitation of Our Lady in Poštorná

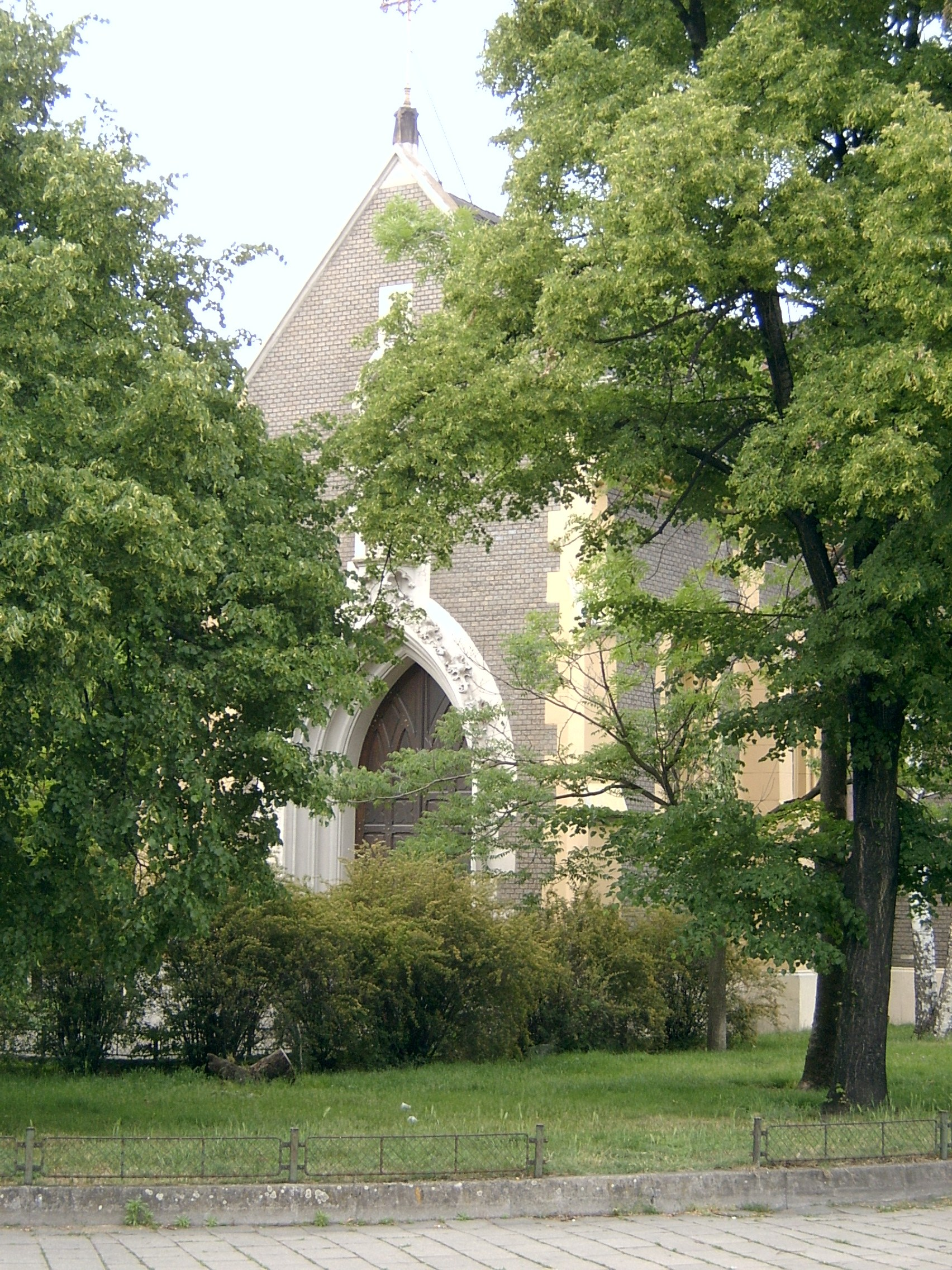
Chapel of Saints Cyril and Methodius

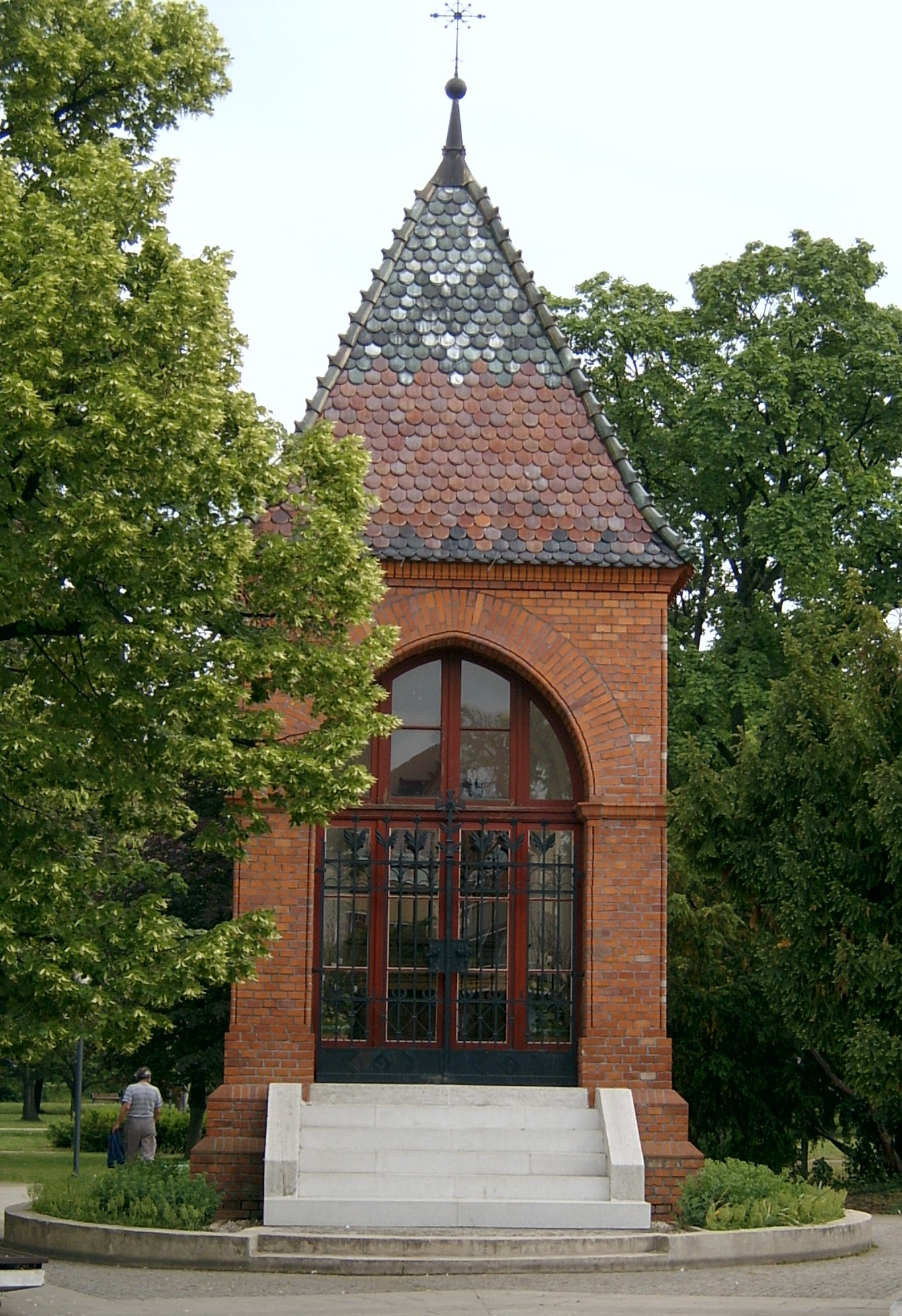
Chapel of Saint Rochus

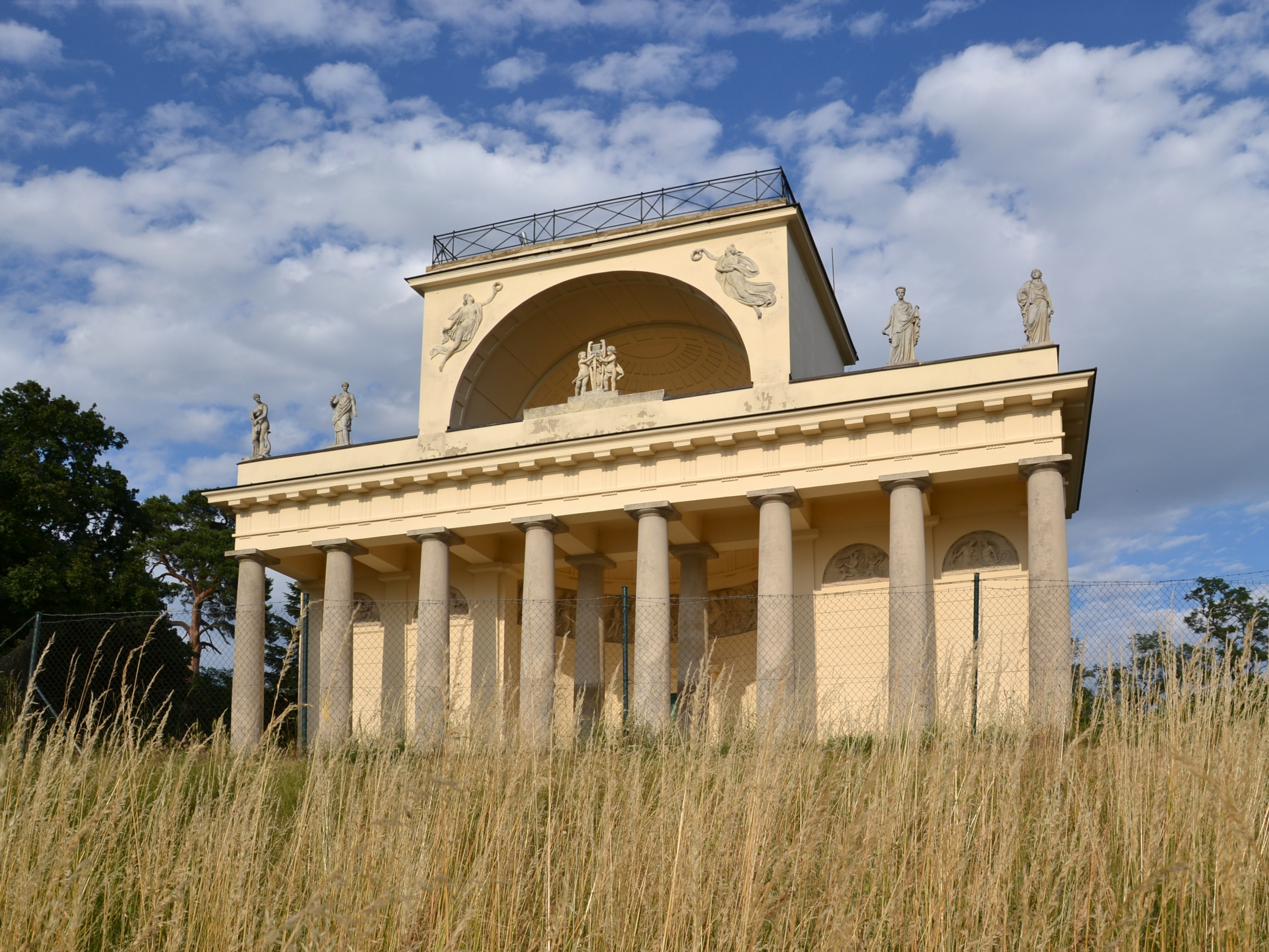
Apollo Temple
