= Ladná =

- Municipality
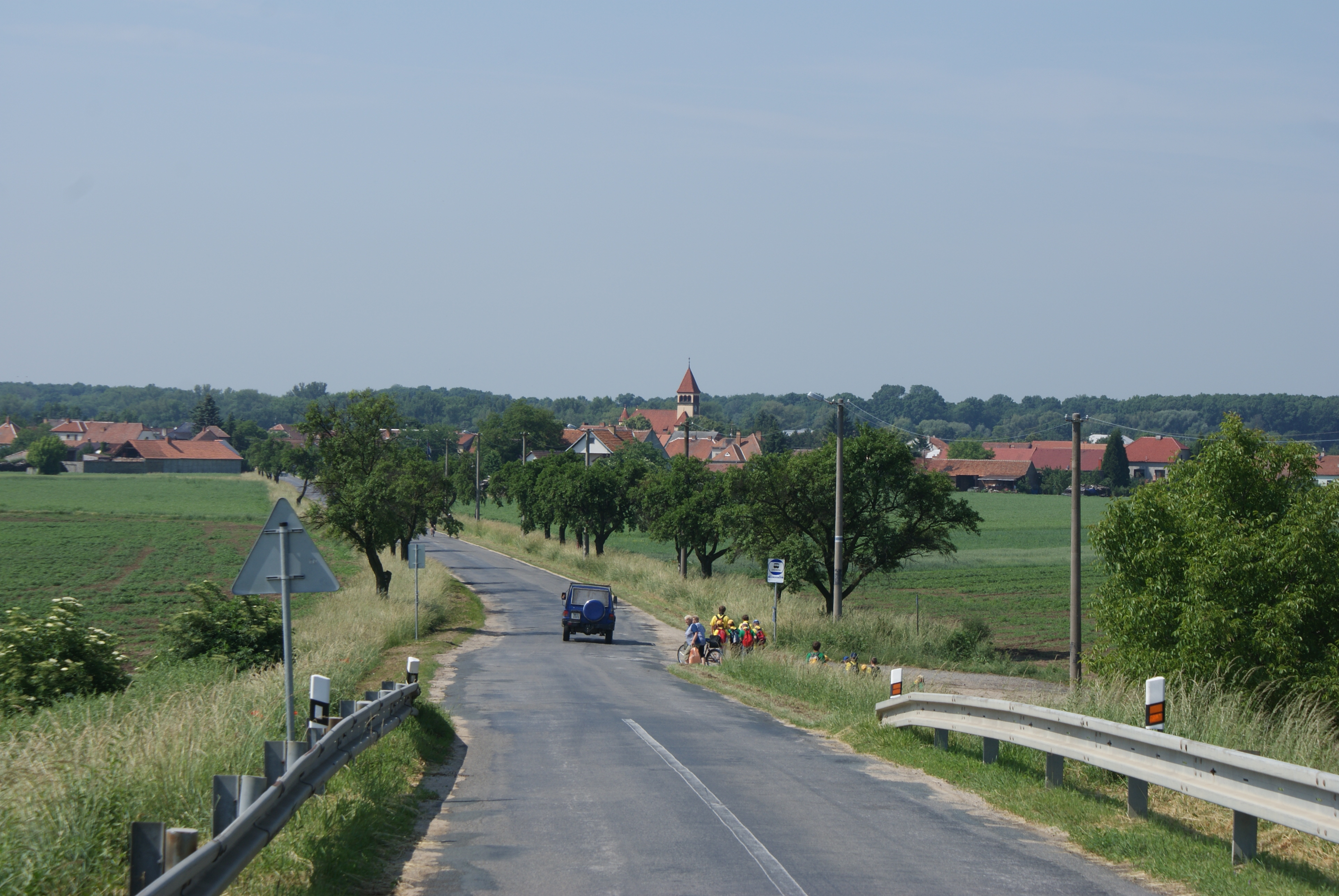
- View from the northeast

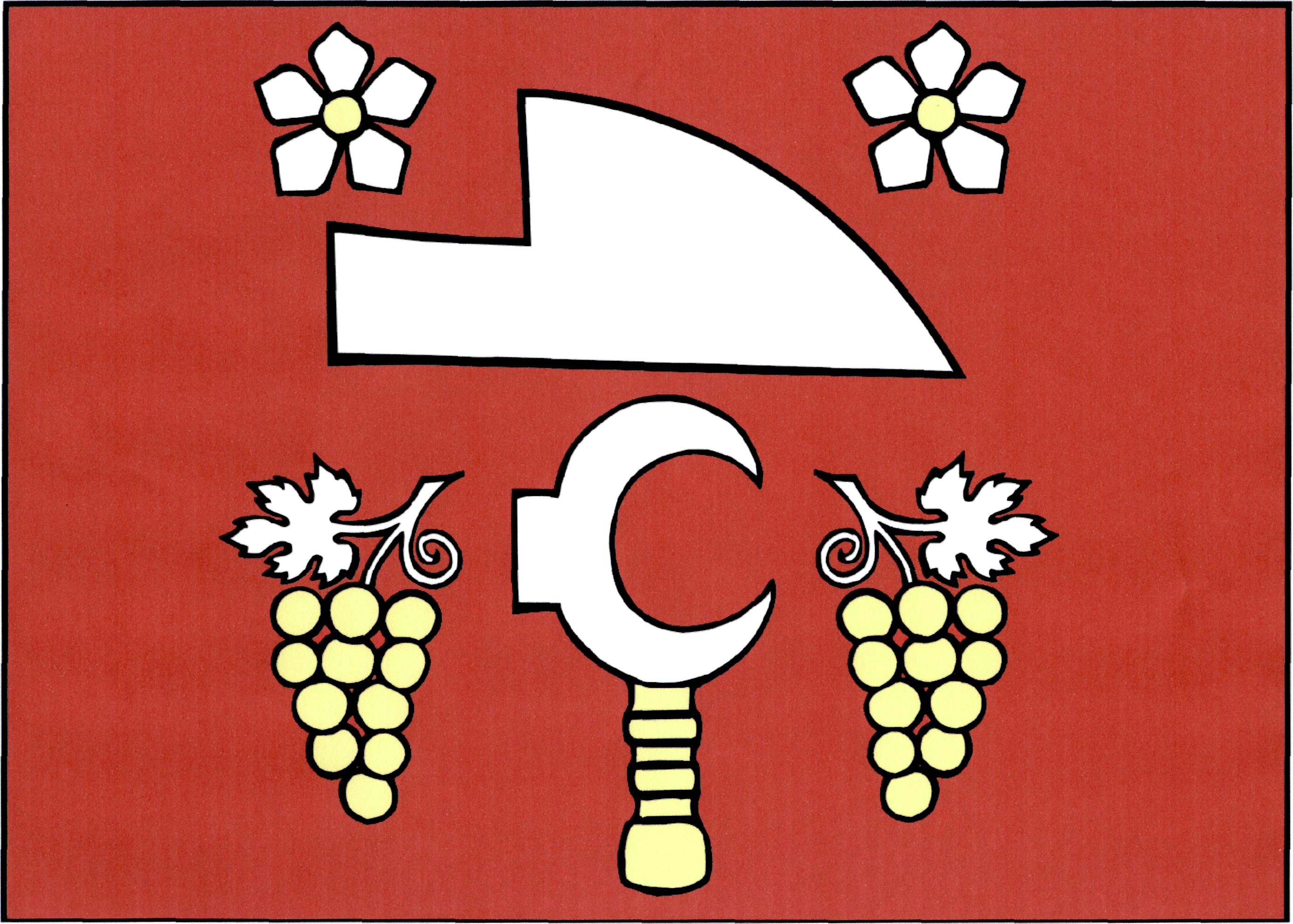
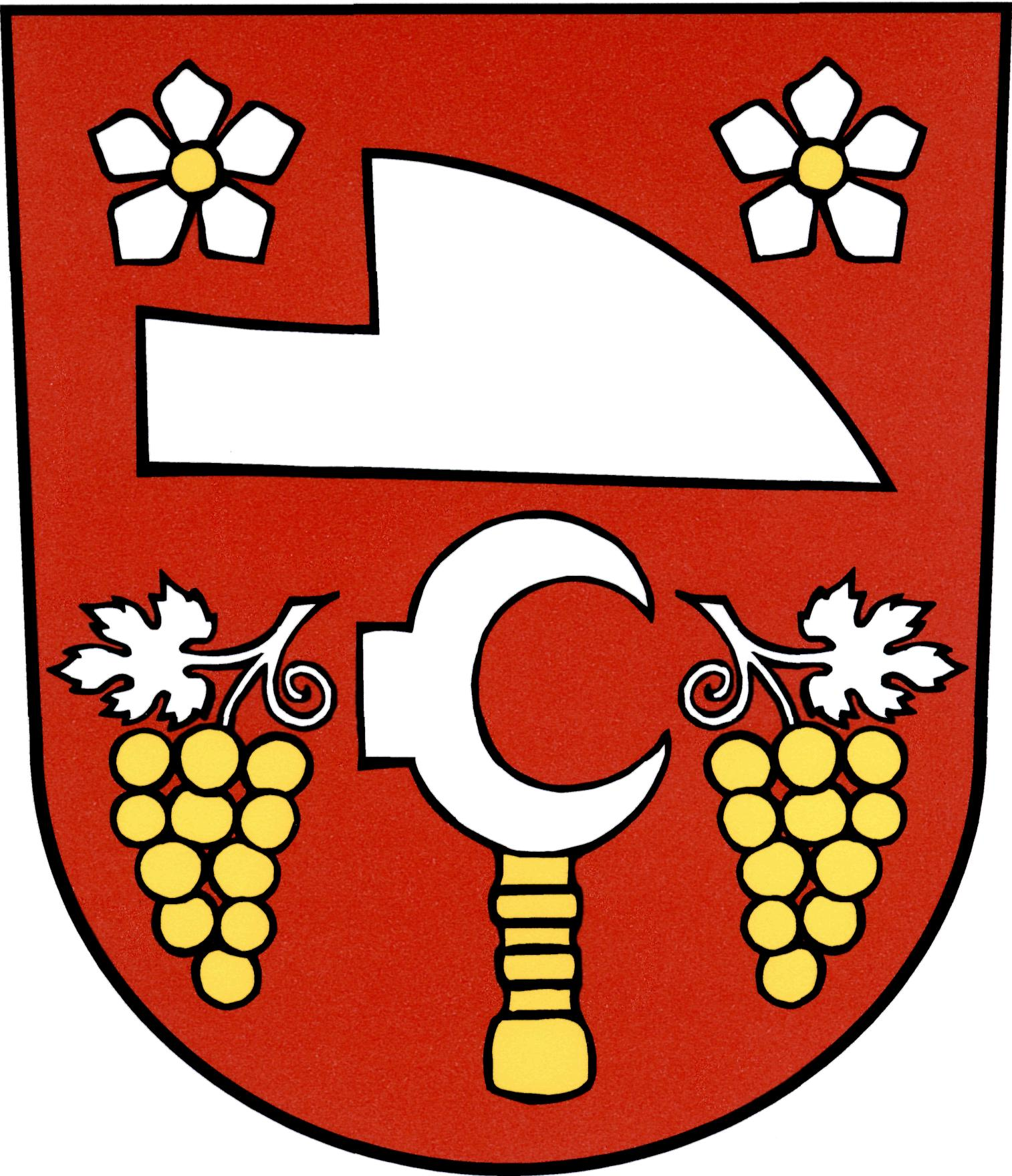
- Flag Coat of arms

- Location in the Czech Republic
- Coordinates: 48°48′20″N 16°52′20″E
- Country: Czech Republic
- Region: South Moravian
- District: Břeclav
- First mentioned: 1271

Area
  - Total: 10.06 km^{2} (3.88 sq mi)
- Elevation: 160 m (520 ft)

Population (2026-01-01)
  - Total: 1,271
  - Density: 126.3/km^{2} (327.2/sq mi)
- Time zone: UTC+1 (CET)
  - Summer (DST): UTC+2 (CEST)
- Postal code: 691 46
- Website: www.obecladna.cz

Ladná (until 1950 Lanštorf; German: Rampersdorf) is a municipality and village in Břeclav District in the South Moravian Region of the Czech Republic. It has about 1,300 inhabitants.

== Geography ==
Ladná is located about 4 kilometres (2 mi) north of Břeclav and 47 km (29 mi) south of Brno. It lies in a flat agricultural landscape in the Lower Morava Valley. The Thaya River flows along the western municipal border.

== History ==
The first written mention of Lanštorf is from 1271. Until the beginning of the 16th century, it was part of the Podivín estate, then it was annexed to the Břeclav estate.

In 1950, the name of the municipality was changed to Ladná. Ladná was an independent municipality until 31 July 1976, when it became a municipal part of Břeclav. Since 1 July 2006, it has been a separate municipality.

== Demographics ==
Historical population

| Year | Pop. | ±% |
|---|---|---|
| 1869 | 633 | — |
| 1880 | 699 | +10.4% |
| 1890 | 765 | +9.4% |
| 1900 | 939 | +22.7% |
| 1910 | 1,037 | +10.4% |

| Year | Pop. | ±% |
|---|---|---|
| 1921 | 1,062 | +2.4% |
| 1930 | 1,179 | +11.0% |
| 1950 | 1,124 | −4.7% |
| 1961 | 1,272 | +13.2% |
| 1970 | 1,297 | +2.0% |

| Year | Pop. | ±% |
|---|---|---|
| 1980 | 1,307 | +0.8% |
| 1991 | 1,227 | −6.1% |
| 2001 | 1,228 | +0.1% |
| 2011 | 1,218 | −0.8% |
| 2021 | 1,181 | −3.0% |

Source: Censuses

== Transport ==
The D2 motorway (part of the European route E65) from Brno to Břeclav passes through the municipal territory.

Ladná is located on the railway line Břeclav–Šakvice.

== Sights ==
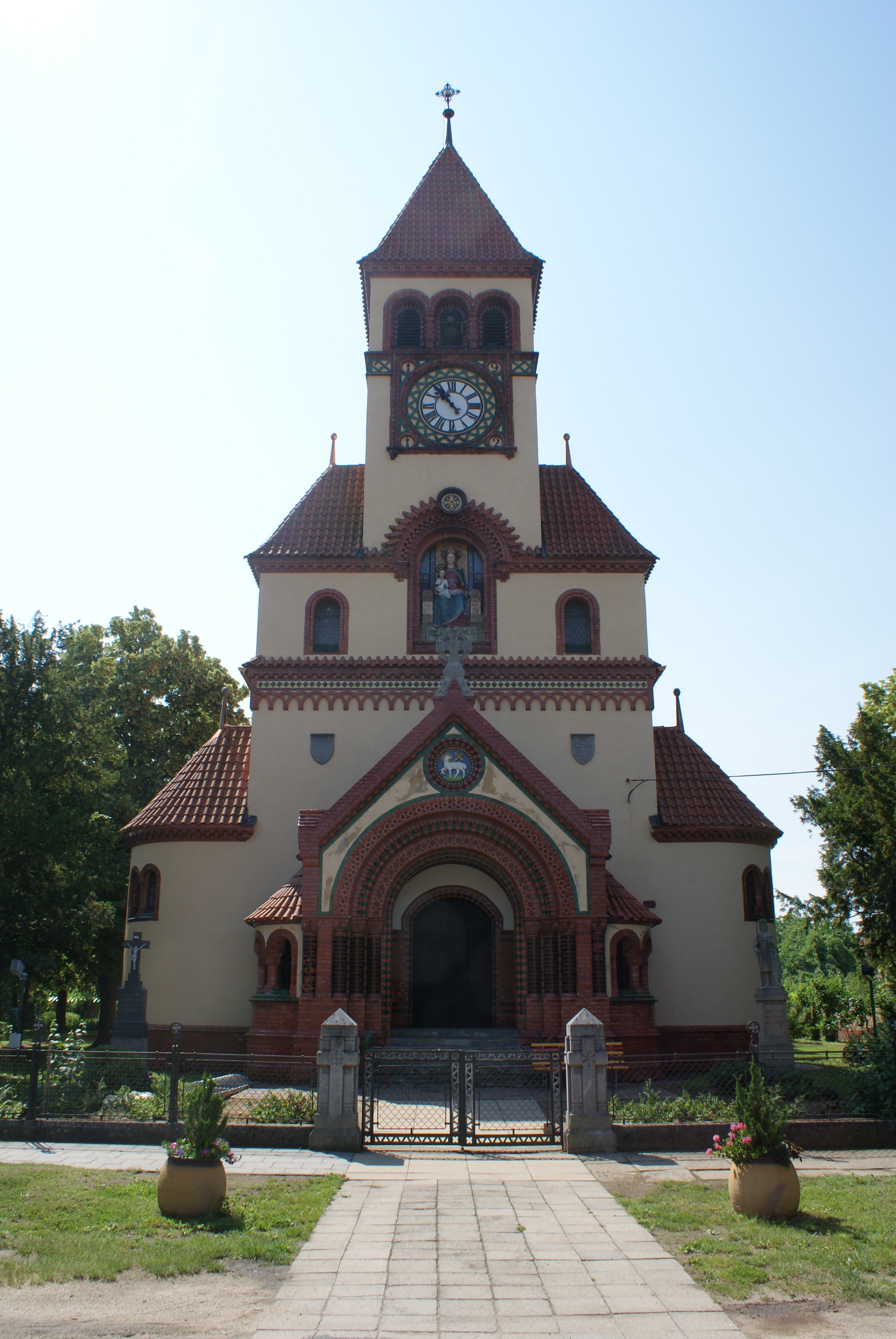
Church of Saint Michael the Archangel

The main landmark of Ladná is the Church of Saint Michael the Archangel. It was built in the Neo-Romanesque style in 1911–1914.
