= Zdeněk Sádecký =

Zdeněk Sádecký (2 June 1925 – 28 December 1971) was a Czech musicologist.

Sádecký was born in Dvůr Králové nad Labem. Having received a doctorate in 1951 with the essay Boj za demokratickou piseň v obrození ("The struggle for democratic song in the Czech revival"), his early work focused on defining Czech musical socialist realism. With its decline in the late fifties, he drew his attention to the main Czech composers, including Leoš Janáček. He is reputed as one of the most prominent scholars of Josef Suk's musical aesthetic.

Sádecký died in 1971, in Prague.
