= Zdenka Buben =

American social worker

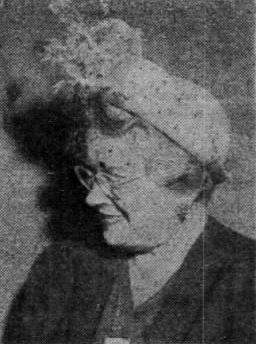
Zdenka Buben in 1950

Zdenka Buben (1895–1988) was an American public health social worker who pioneered the development of many professional standards.

== Early life ==
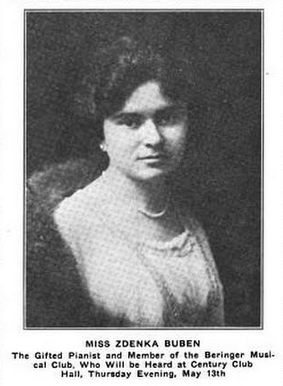
Zdenka Buben, from a 1920 publication.

Buben was born to a Czech family in Paris, France in 1895. Her mother did not like France, and thus her father suggested that they move. When Zdenka was two, Buben's father's friend arranged for Buben's father to transfer his work to New York, where the Buben family lived until 1908. In 1908, they moved to San Francisco, where Buben finished high school. She went on to attend the University of California at Berkeley, where she originally majored in music. She switched her major to Hygiene, a department where people were trained as somewhat nurse and somewhat social work trainees. and went on to graduate and become a Health Visitor for the city of Alameda. Afterwards, her title changed, and she became a public health nurse in Los Angeles.

== Career ==
Buben joined the Council of Social Agencies in its Health Division. She eventually helped work toward establishing a school of social work in Los Angeles, and also established a Bureau of Social Work in the Los Angeles County health department. At the time, many private medical doctors were against publicly funded medical care, and the Health Department also feuded with doctors about who should exactly receive care. Despite being the chief medical social worker in her department, Buben actually did not have a degree in social work until she decided to do so in the 1940s. She went on to attend the University of Chicago and obtained her master's degree in Social Work. Afterward, she returned to Los Angeles and returned to her old position as the Director of Public Health Social Work, and maintained that position until her retirement in October 1961. Throughout her career, she advocated for the development of professional standards. Some of her lasting legacy of practices are the development of a sliding scale of fees for indigent persons who wished to receive medical care; the development of numerous social work training schools; and connecting many social agencies, the Health Department, and medical providers with one another. Buben also was a proponent of preventative care for diseases that are preventable, particularly tuberculosis and smallpox. She also lobbied for standards for social work and better licensure practices. In recognition of her significant contribution to social work, Buben was inducted to the California Social Work Hall of Distinction.
