= Zdeněk Ziegler =

Zdeněk Ziegler may refer to:

- Zdeněk Ziegler (artist) (1932–2023), Czech artist
- Zdeněk Ziegler (canoeist) (1926–2022), Czech canoeist
