= Zdenko Feyfar =

Czech photographer

Zdenko Feyfar (1913–2001) was a Czechoslovak photographer.

His work is included in the collections of the Museum of Fine Arts Houston and the George Eastman Museum.
