= Zdeňka Pokorná =

Czech teacher (1905–2007)

Pokorná after receiving the Czechoslovak Order of Merit

Zdeňka Pokorná (6 April 1905 – 3 March 2007) was a Czechoslovak teacher and patriot. She was hailed on her 90th birthday as the "living conscience of the century" by the Czech Government. She opposed the Habsburg, Nazi and Soviet Union occupations of her homeland and following the 1948 Czechoslovak coup d'état she was forced into exile to the United Kingdom, where she lived the rest of her life.

== Biography ==
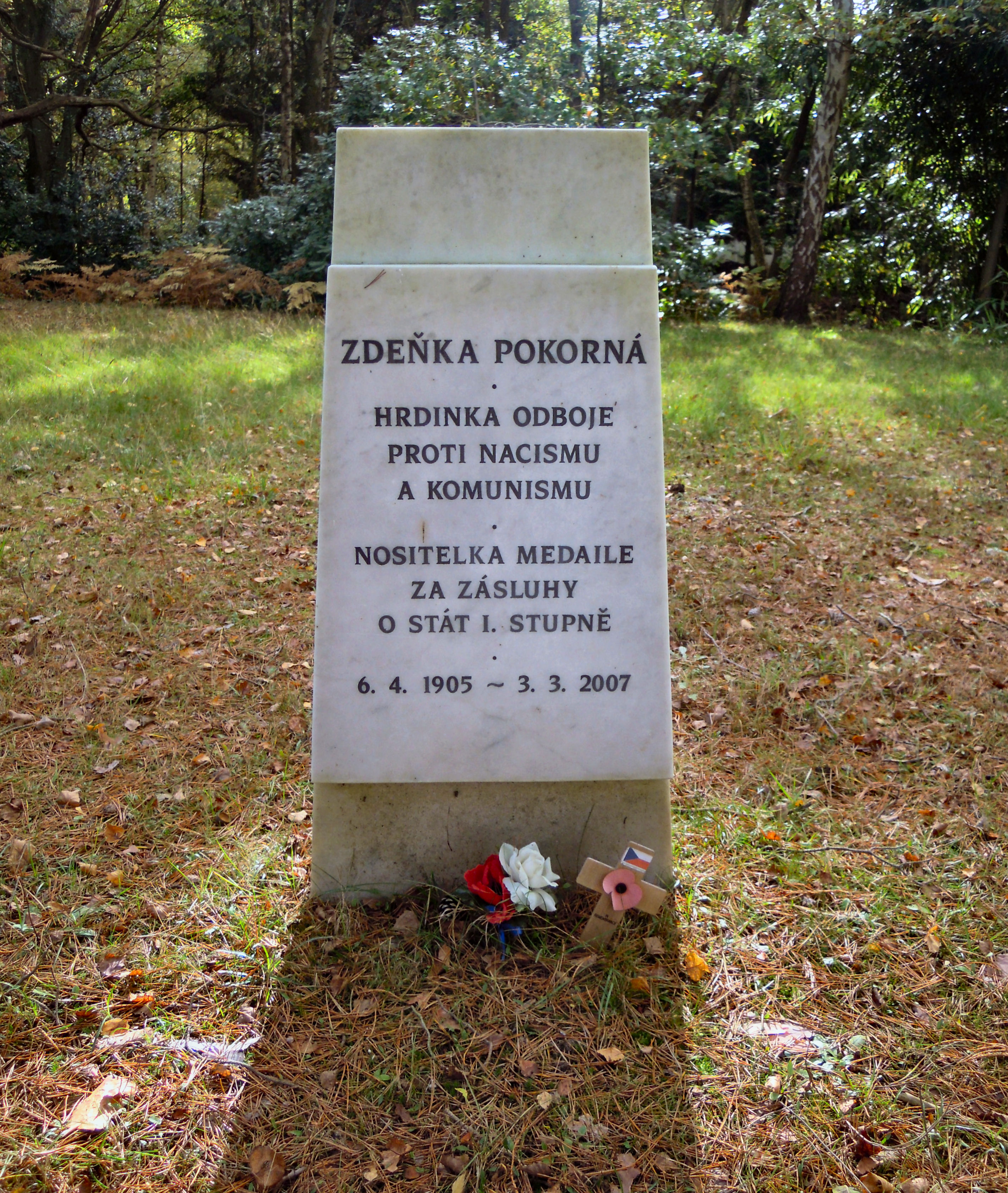
The grave of Zdeňka Pokorná in Brookwood Cemetery

Born in Břeclav in 1905, Pokorná was a member of the anti-Nazi Czech Resistance Movement who, following the Nazi occupation of Czechoslovakia, helped a group of people to escape to Yugoslavia. Shortly after she was arrested by the Gestapo, probably as a result of information from an informer, and was sentenced to life imprisonment spending the rest of the war in various prisons and surviving a Death March in 1945.

Expelled from her position as headmistress in Břeclav after the 1948 Czechoslovak coup d'état because of her anti-Soviet stance, she avoided impending arrest by escaping to Austria. Her political activities during World War II gained her the right to asylum in the United Kingdom where she retrained as a psychiatric nurse, and from here she continued both her anti-communist campaigning and her work for Czechoslovak expatriate organisations including the Association of Czechoslovak Legionaries.

Pokorná was awarded the Czechoslovak Order of Merit (First Class) by President Václav Havel for her outstanding work for her home country and for upholding the ideals of freedom. For the remainder of her life Pokorná lived in the United Kingdom but never relinquished her Czech nationality.

Zdeňka Pokorná died in London in 2007 aged 101 and was cremated at Honor Oak Crematorium following which her ashes were buried in the Czechoslovak section of Brookwood Cemetery in Surrey.
