= Zdena =

Zdena may refer to:

- Zdena, river in Sanski Most
- Zdena Dorňáková, Czech gymnast
- Zdena Hadrbolcová (1937–2023), Czech actress
- Zdena Herfortová (born 1945), Czech film and stage actress
- Zdena Salivarová (1933–2025), Czech-born writer and translator
- Zdena Studenková (born 1954), Slovak film and stage actress
- Zdena Tichá (born 1952), Czech rower
- Zdena Tominová (1941–2020), Czech novelist and former communist-era dissident
- Zdena Zimmermannová (born 1973), Czech volleyball player
