= Zdenka Kabátová-Táborská =

Czech painter, printmaker and illustrator

- Born: 3 June 1933 (age 93); Prague, Czechoslovakia
- Education: State Graphic School; Academy of Fine Arts, Prague; Hochschule für Grafik und Buchkunst Leipzig
- Occupations: painter, printmaker, illustrator
- Notable work: two prints in National Gallery of Art

Zdenka Kabátová-Táborská (born 3 June 1933) is a Czech painter, printmaker and illustrator.

== Life ==
A native of Prague, Kabátová-Táborská graduated from the State Graphic School in 1952. From 1953 until 1958, she was a pupil of Vladimír Silovský at the Academy of Fine Arts, Prague. In 1959 she graduated from the Hochschule für Grafik und Buchkunst Leipzig. She has worked with numerous magazines and publishers over her career, and her work has appeared in exhibitions both at home and abroad. Two prints by Kabátová-Táborská are in the collection of the National Gallery of Art.
