= Zdeněk Bradáč =

Czech illusionist, escapologist and juggler

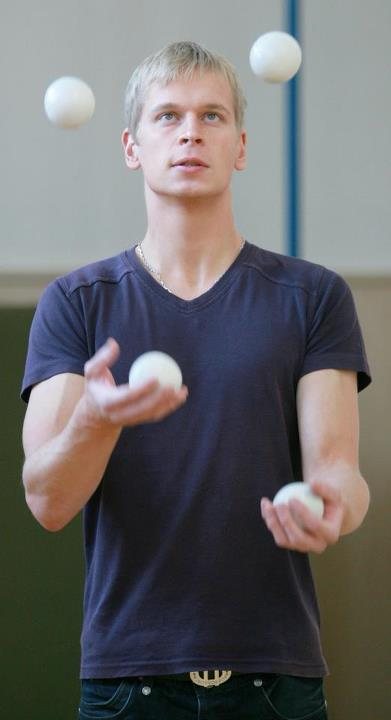
- Born: 27 February 1987 (age 38); Liberec, Czechoslovakia
- Occupation(s): Illusionist, juggler, escapologist
- Years active: 2007–present
- Website: www.zdenekbradac.com

Zdeněk Bradáč (born 27 February 1987) is a Czech illusionist, magician, escapologist and juggler. He has been recognized for breaking multiple records for straitjacket and handcuff escapes as well as juggling and illusions.

== Magician and illusionist ==
He started doing magic at the age of eleven and now performs both in the Czech Republic and abroad.

== Guinness World Records ==
Bradac holds multiple Guinness World Records for escape, illusion and juggling.

According to Guinness, Bradáč has achieved, amongst his records the following feats:

- The most handcuffs (7) unlocked in one minute in Jablonec nad Nisou, Czech Republic, on 15 February 2011
- The fastest time to escape from three handcuffs underwater (38.69 seconds) in Jablonec nad Nisou, Czech Republic, on 9 September 2009.
- The fastest handcuff escape (1.66 sec).
- The longest duration juggling four objects (02:46:48) in Jablonec nad Nisou, Czech Republic, on 30 November 2010.
