= Zdenka Bergrová =

Czech poet and translator

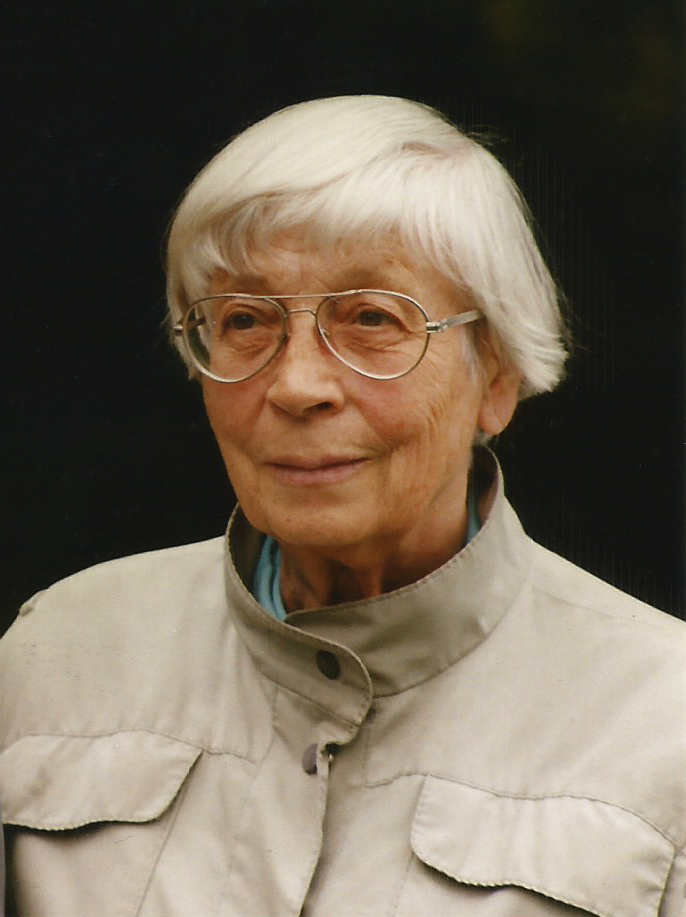
Bergrová in 2003

Zdenka Bergrová (née Vovsová; 10 March 1923 in Prague – 22 May 2008 in Prague) was a Czech poet and translator. She was best known for her children's plays, epigrams, fairy tales, and translations of works from Russian, Ukrainian, French, and English.
