= Dovbush (film) =

2023 film by Oles Sanin

- Directed by: Oles Sanin
- Written by: Paul Wolansky; Oles Sanin; Vasyl Portyak; Maksym Chernysh
- Produced by: Maxim Asadchiy; Oles Sanin
- Starring: Serhiy Strelnikov; Oleksii Hnatkovskyi; Daria Plakhtiy; Agata Buzek; Mateusz Kościukiewicz; Rostyslav Derzhypilskyi
- Cinematography: Sergiy Mykhailchuk
- Music by: Alla Zagaykevich, Oleksandr Chornyi
- Distributed by: Film.Ua Distribution Kinomania
- Release date: August 24, 2023
- Running time: 120 min.
- Country: Ukraine
- Languages: Ukrainian, Polish
- Budget: $3.2 million

Dovbush (Ukrainian: «Довбуш») is a Ukrainian historical adventure film directed by Oles Sanin and based on the life of Oleksa Dovbush, the most famous of opryshky leaders in the Carpathian Mountains. The film is one of the most expensive Ukrainian films with a budget of UAH 120 million (state share UAH 65 million).

The premiere took place on August 24, 2023 (the May 2022 release was canceled due to the Russian invasion of Ukraine).

The history of cinematic references to the image of Oleksa Dovbush includes the 1959 film Oleksa Dovbush directed by Viktor Ivanov with Afanasii Kochetkov in the title role, and the 2018 film Legend of the Carpathians directed by Serhii Skobun with Valerii Kharchyshyn.

== Plot ==
The film takes place in the early 18th century in the Carpathians of the Polish–Lithuanian Commonwealth. The brutal rule of the Polish gentry (szlachta) forces the Hutsuls to flee to the mountains. Two brothers, Oleksa and Ivan Dovbush, find themselves outlawed and become opryshky. In search of revenge on the lords for the murder of Dovbush's parents, the brothers become enemies to each other. One wants money, the other wants justice. The Hutsuls start an uprising led by Oleksa.

== Historical inspiration ==
The production of the movie involved in-depth historical research. In his interviews, the principal director, Oles Sanin, mentions consulting historians, working with primary sources, and collaborating with museums and archives. The history of Dovbush exists mainly in the form of folk tales, legends, and artistic interpretations. Over time, multiple versions of the story emerged, which makes the research especially challenging. Oles Sanin brings his creative vision, merging the legends together and drawing inspiration from Ukrainian resistance at Euromaidan and during the Russo-Ukrainian war. Oles Sanin recognizes the limitations of historical research and claims that the film is a legendary story, rather than documentary:

"This film is not a documentary. It's not a classic biopic (biographical film). My film is a legendary story. It's my own interpretation of history that could have happened. Because we couldn't completely trust the documents of those who wished death upon Oleksa Dovbush."

== Cast ==
Main characters

- Serhiy Strelnikov – Oleksa Dovbush
- Oleksiy Hnatkovsky – Ivan Dovbush
- Daria Plakhtiy – Marichka
- Agata Buzek – Princess Jabłonowska
- Mateusz Kościukiewicz – Colonel Przeluski
- Jerzy Sheibal – hetman Józef Potocki
- Vladimir Belyaev – Shram
- Oleksandr Mavrits – Stefan Dzvinchuk
- Luzer Twersky — Baal Shem Tov
- Opryshoks:
  - Rostyslav Derzhypilsky — opryshok Pravytsia, Ivan Dovbush's tutor
  - Dmytro Vivchariuk – opryshok Zabo
  - Roman Yasinovskyi – opryshok Adam
  - Oleh Shulga – opryshok "Strelets"
- Yakiv Tkachenko – opryshok Sabat
  - Petro Zhirun – opryshok
  - Pavlo Zhirun – opryshok

Episodic roles

- Olieh Drach – Count Dönhoff
- Ashot Arushanov – vartan
- Lev Skop – the priest
- Kateryna Pavlenko – a molfar
- Artem Milevsky – the innkeeper
- Vitaliy Markiv – a visitor to the tavern
- Maria Saulko – a peasant woman
- Serhiy Ternytskyi – Polish nobleman

== Production ==
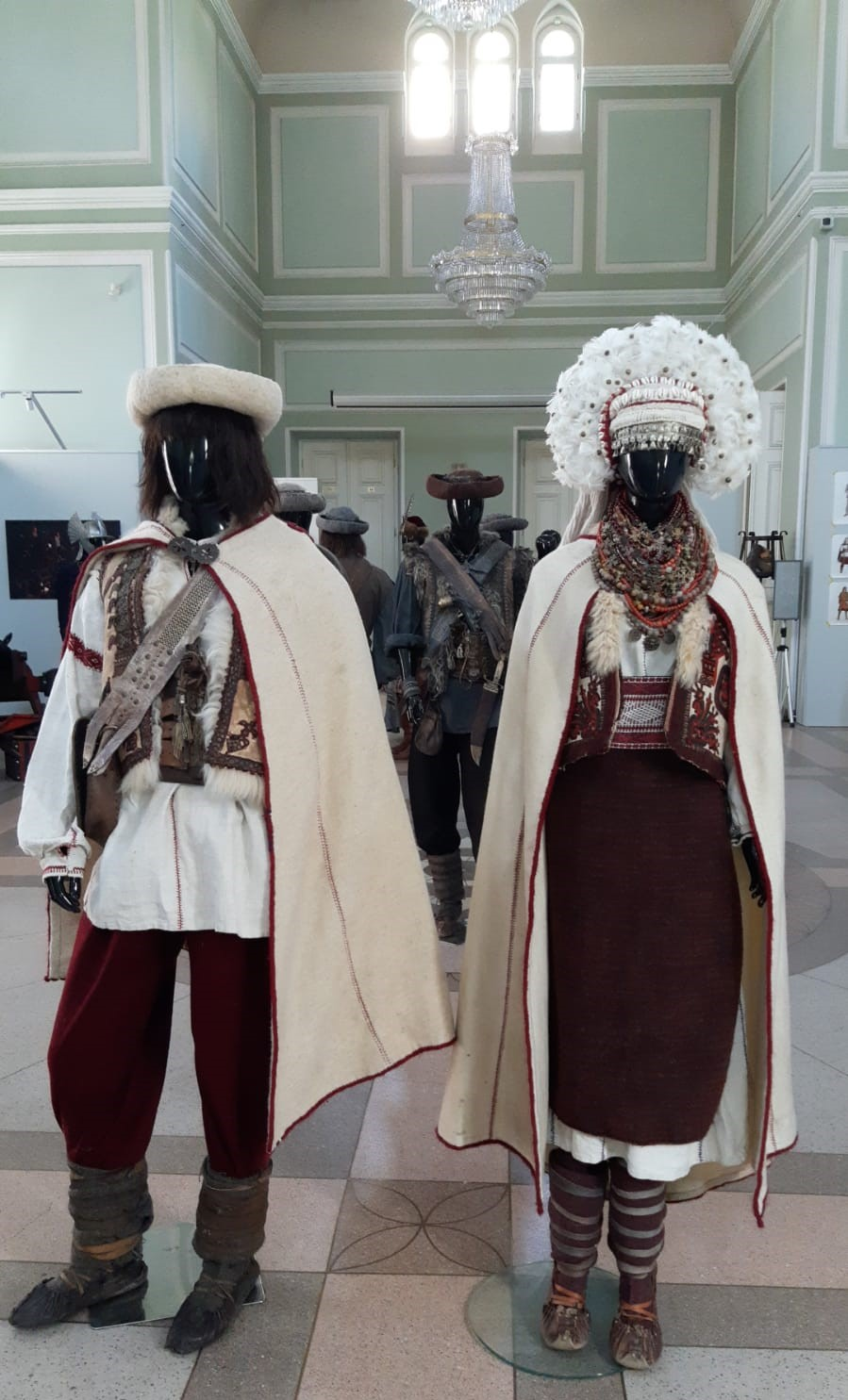
Exhibition of costumes, props and sketches "Create the film Dovbush". September, 2023

The filming period began in August 2018. The process was interrupted for technical reasons, then due to quarantine restrictions. The final shooting began in early June 2021.

The filming took place in the Carpathians, Lviv, Ternopil region and Kyiv. Among the locations are ancient castles (in particular, Svirzh Castle) in Lviv region and other historical sites that help create the atmosphere of the first half of the 18th century.

The film's budget was about UAH 120 million (over $3 million), 65 million of which was provided by the Ukrainian State Film Agency. More than 1,000 costumes were made for the film, with more than 3,000 costumers working on them, and the number of people involved in the filming process at the same time was about 600.

== Team ==
- Director of photography, co-writer, co-producer: Oles Sanin;
- Director of Photography: Serhiy Mykhalchuk;
- Editor: Khodakivska Tetyana, with the participation of Oleksandr Chornyi, Andriy Toloshnyi, Andriy Zapryagalov;
- Production designers: Oleksandra Drobot, Yuriy Hryhorovych;
- Stunt directors: Ruslan Gorily, Petro and Pavlo Zhiruny, Petro Trisko;
- Casting director: Alla Samoilenko;
- Costume designers: Gala Otenko and Maria Kero;
- Make-up artist: Iryna Solodovska;
- Composers: Alla Zahaykevych, Oleksandr Chornyi;
- Logo design by font designer Bohdan Hdal

== Release ==
External videos
- 1-й україномовний тизер-трейлер фільму «Довбуш» on YouTube
- Фінальний трейлер фільму «Довбуш» on YouTube

The film's wide release began on August 24, 2023, on the occasion of Ukraine's Independence Day. During the first weekend from August 24 to 27, the film grossed UAH 8.7 million at the box office. The box office includes the results of the film team's tour of Ukraine, which began on August 19.

The release of the film in Ukrainian cinemas has been postponed several times: from the fall of 2021 to the spring of 2022. Due to the Russian invasion of Ukraine, the premiere was canceled. On May 11, 2022, the authors of the film announced that it would take place after Ukraine's victory in the Russo-Ukrainian War.

== Reception ==
=== Critical response ===
According to Svitlana Khomych, a spokeswoman for Kinomania, the historical action film became the most popular film of the week in the distributor's catalog. After Dovbush, the next most popular film in the catalog was the American superhero film Blue Beetle, which grossed UAH 2.1 million.

"Dovbush is a unique film, at least because something of this magnitude has never been filmed in Ukraine since independence," says film critic Kyrylo Pishchykov in his review for vikna.tv. On the other hand, the critic considers the character of Oleksa Dovbush to be incomplete and lacking in background, if we do not talk about the historical background of the character, but read his character, motivation and actions solely from the film's script. In Pishchykov's opinion, Oleksa's brother Ivan is presented in a more comprehensive and deeper way. In short, despite the scale of the project, the film critic notes the script's shortcomings. "But in general, Dovbush is a movie that is interesting to watch at least because of the cool costumes, gorgeous scenery, and breathtaking mountain landscapes."

Vitaliy Gordienko, the author of the YouTube resource, who said that the creators decided to release the film on the symbolic 33rd Independence Day of Ukraine, despite the fact that the number of cinemas in the country has decreased three times.

After watching the movie, I noted how wonderful it was that the film was released now, because before the full-scale invasion began, many could have accused the film of being too pathetic, and the audience could not take the words of the characters to heart. However, I'm ready to admit that the film's cast has overplayed its hand. Serhiy Strelnikov (Oleksa Dovbush) perfectly matches the image of the hero and throughout the film he tries to live up to his heroic image, constantly casting glances from under his forehead, speaking with his voice raised and sometimes it's too much. So does the actor Oleksiy Hladkovsky (Ivan Dovbush), for whom the role in Dovbush is his debut in a big movie. He overdid it with the desire to give charisma to his character

Aliona Shilova's critique highlights the underdeveloped nature of Marichka's character in the movie. While other characters show more nuanced and conflicting identities, Marichka's portrayal is limited. Her primary function is the romantic part of the plot and supporting Dovbush's storyline. Despite the great effort put by costume designers into making Marichka's appearance on screen memorable, Shilova suggests that the director missed the opportunity to offer the talented actress Daria Plakhtiy a more substantial role while maintaining historical accuracy. At the same time, Shilova acknowledges the movie's significance as a milestone in the development of high-quality Ukrainian cinematography.

== See also ==
- Zakhar Berkut (film, 1971)
