= Yaroshevsky =

Yaroshevsky (Russian: Ярошевский) is a Russian surname. The feminine form is Yaroshevskaya (Russian: Ярошевская). Notable people with these names include:

- Alexey Yaroshevsky (born 1984), Russian reporter, television host and commentator
- George Yaroshevsky (1872–1923), Metropolitan of Warsaw and Russian Patriarchal Exarch in Poland
- Kim Yaroshevskaya (1923–2025), Russian-born Canadian actress
- Ludmila Yaroshevskaya (1906–1975), Soviet composer, pianist, and concertmistress
