= Dovbush rocks =

Combined natural monument in Ivano-Frankivsk Oblast, Ukraine

Coordinates: 49°03′06″N 23°40′44″E

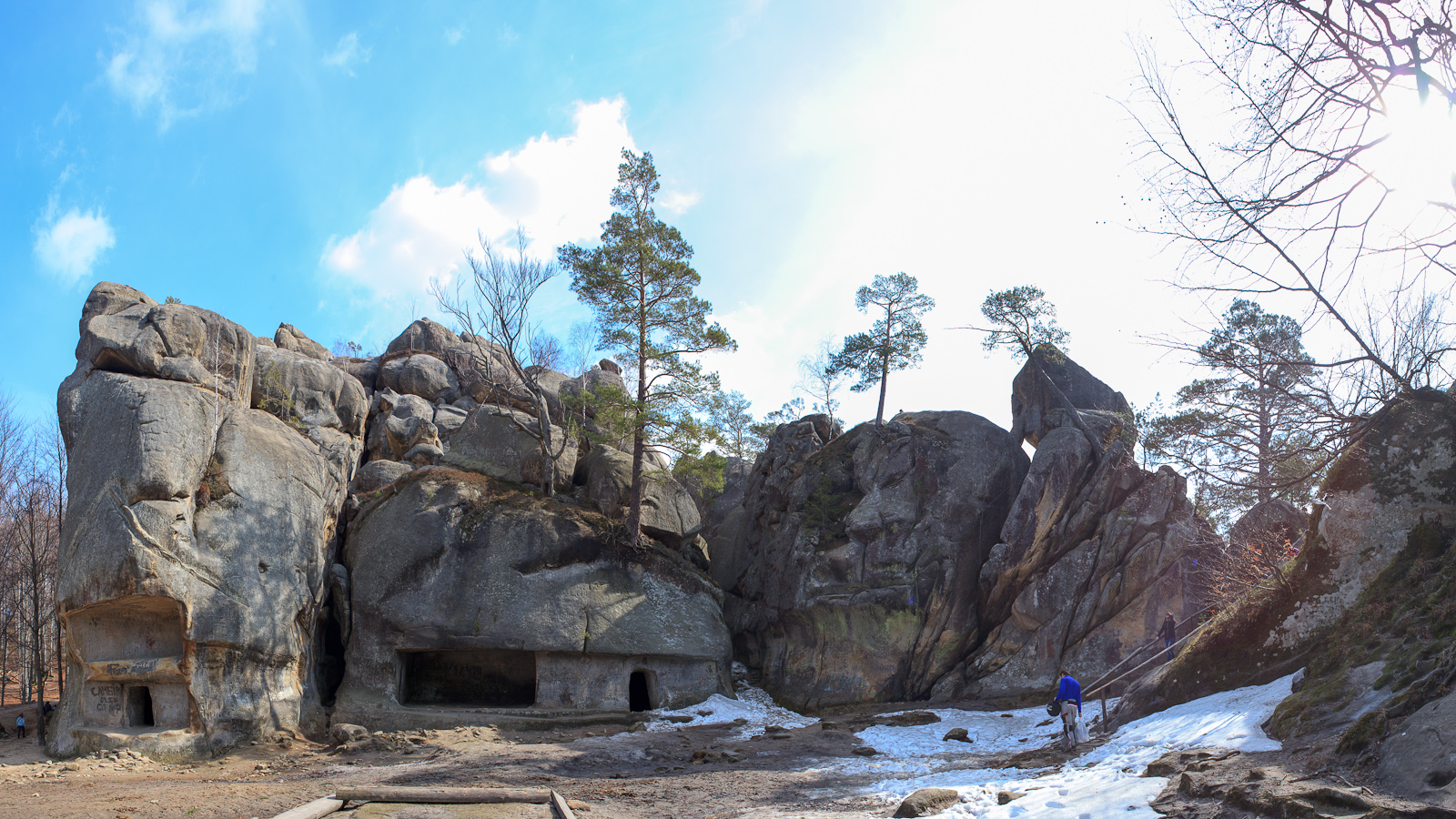
Dovbush rocks

The Rocks of Dovbush (Ukrainian: Скелі Довбуша, romanized: Skeli Dovbusha) is a group of natural and man-made structures carved out of rock at around 980 m ASL approximately 3 km from the village Bubnyshche in the Ivano-Frankivsk Oblast (province) of western Ukraine. The name of the formations comes from a leader of the opryshky movement, Oleksa Dovbush.

The rocks are a part of the Polyanytskiy Regional Landscape Park.

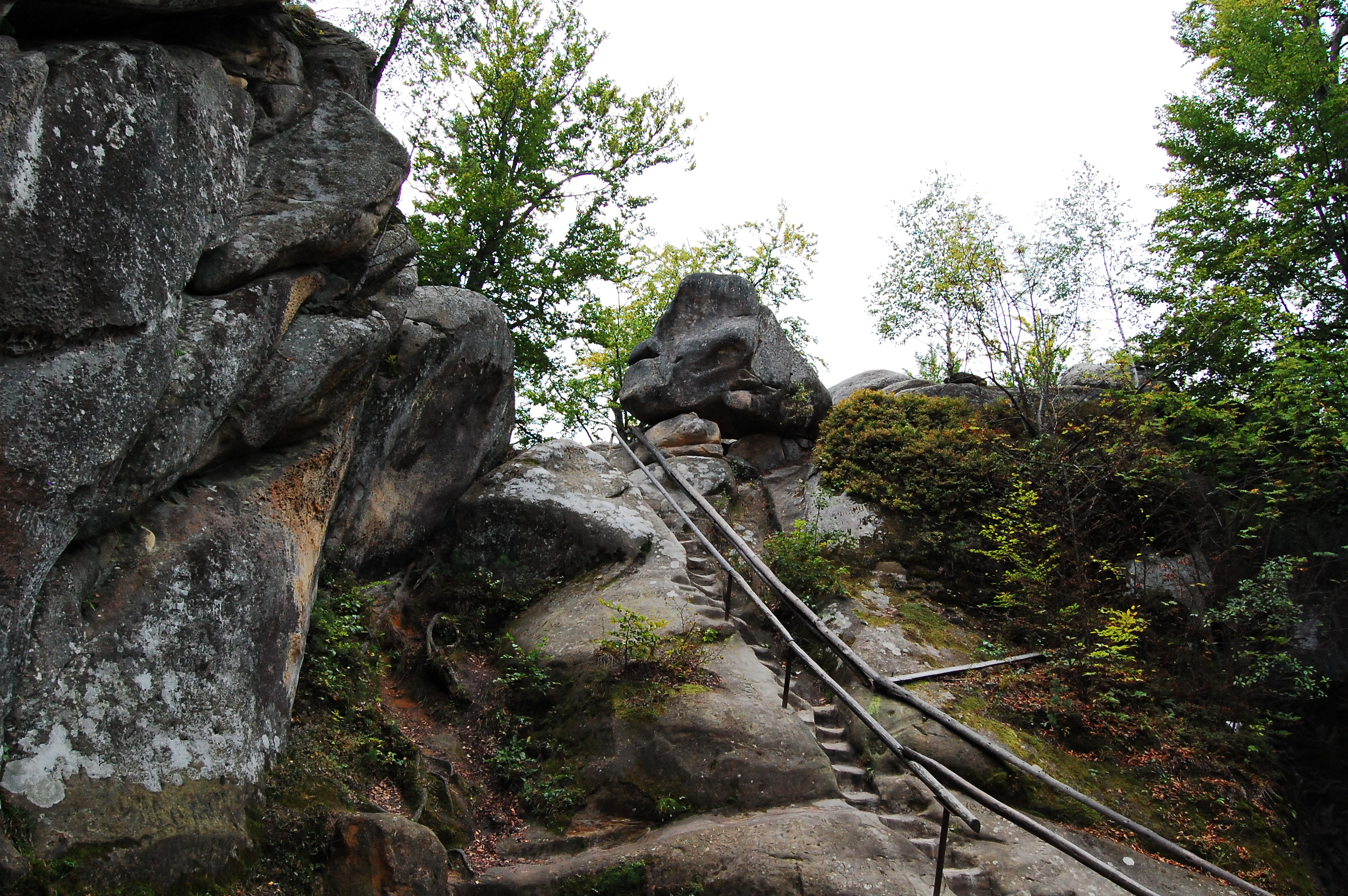
Heart of Oleksa Dovbush

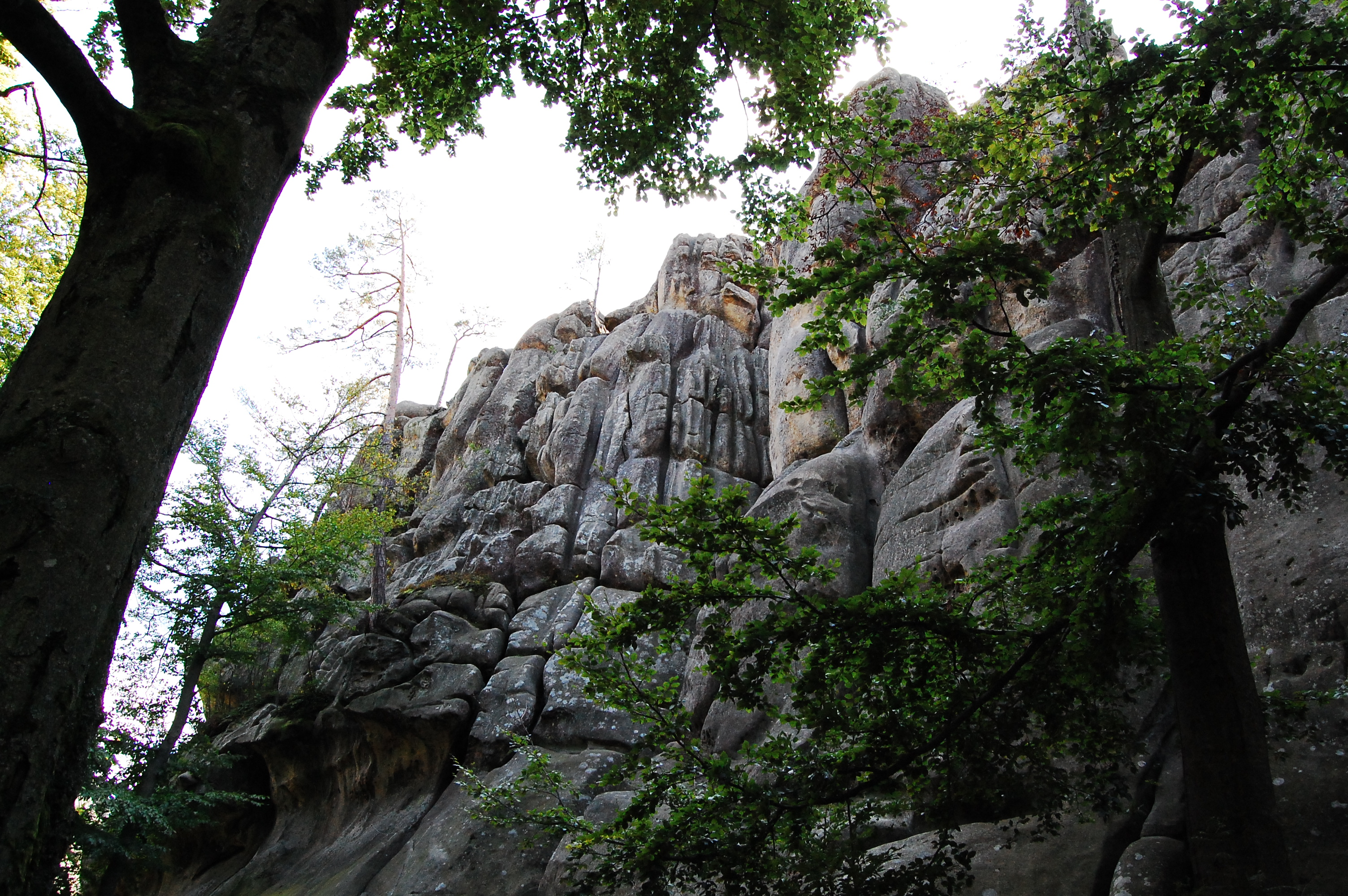
Rocks among the trees

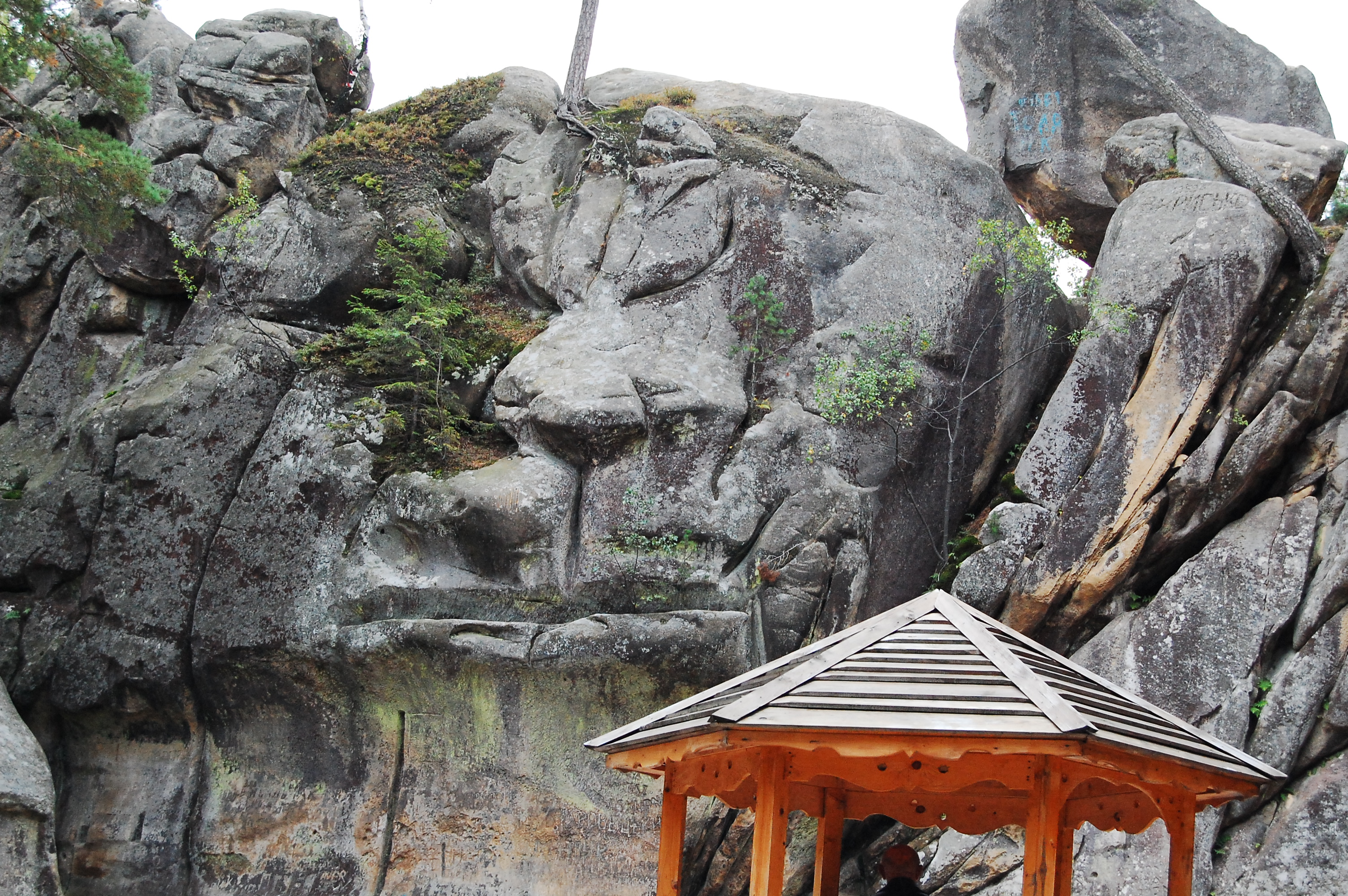
Naturally formed lion face

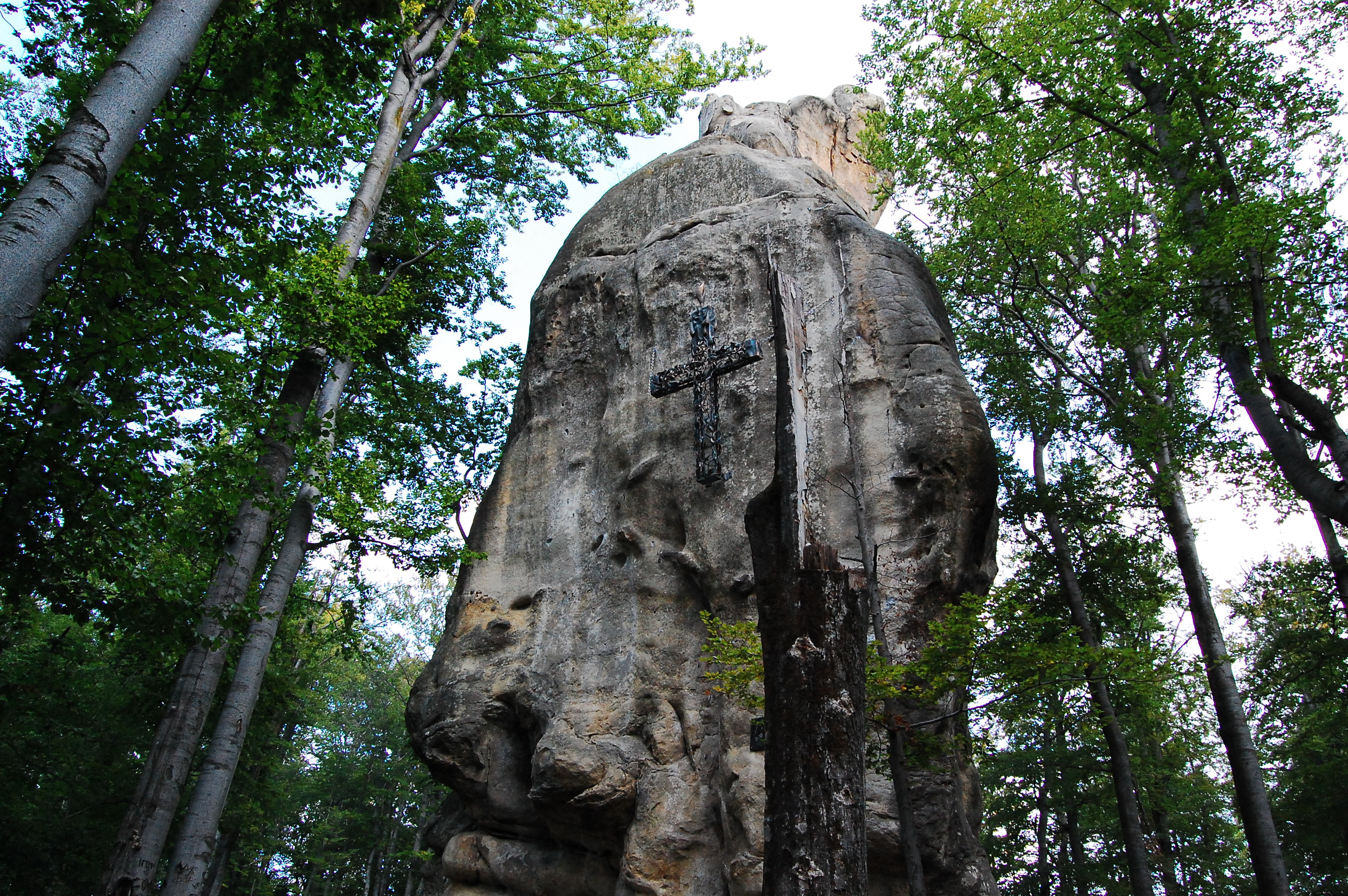
A memorial for climbers

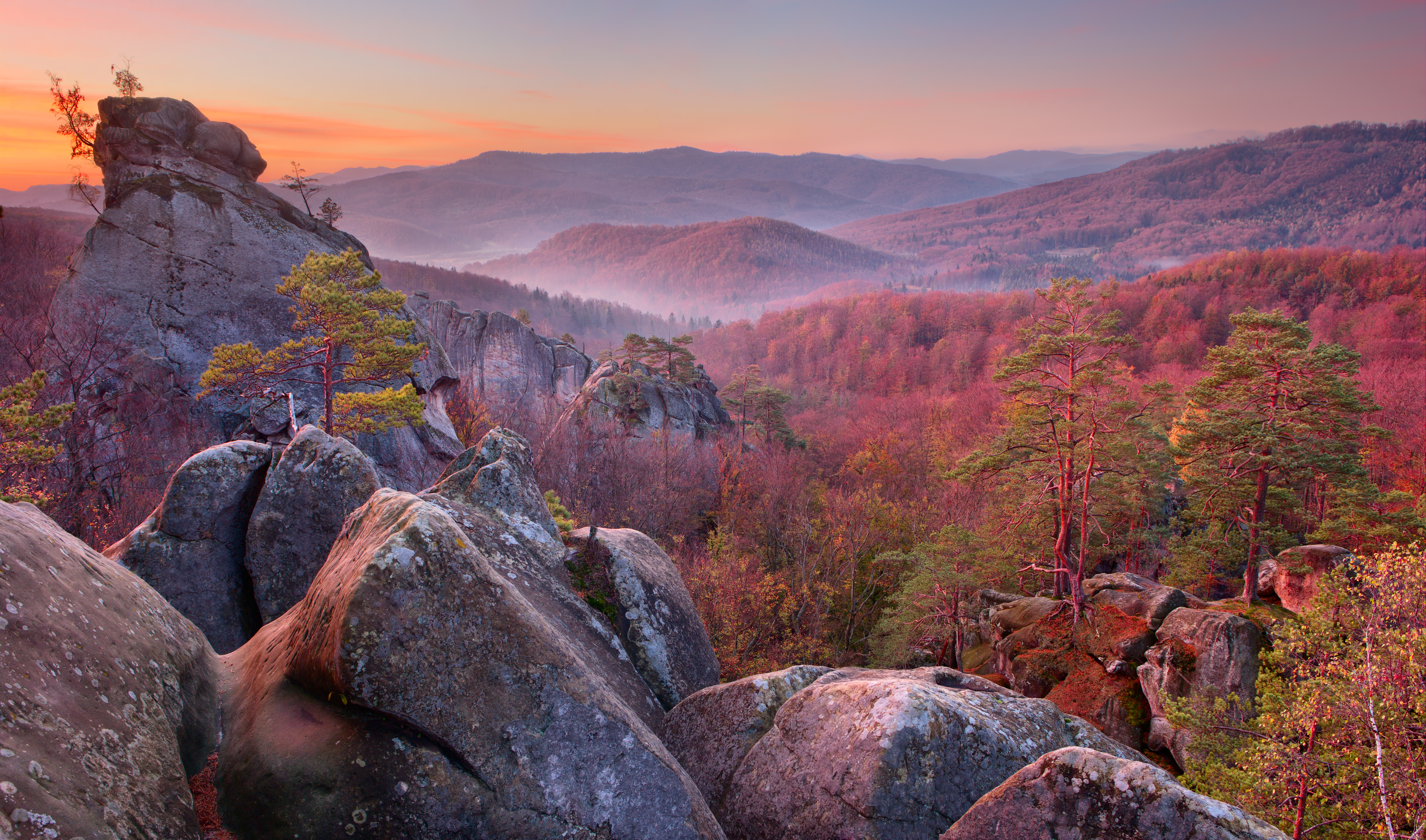

== See also ==
- List of colossal sculpture in situ
- "Polanica - Bołdy Polanickie". Geographical Dictionary of the Kingdom of Poland (in Polish). 8. Warszawa: Kasa im. Józefa Mianowskiego. 1887. p. 564.
