= Seweryn Obst =

Polish painter, illustrator, and ethnographer

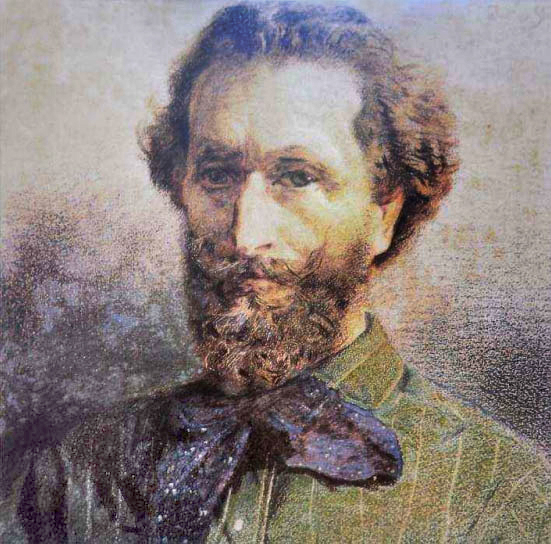
- Born: 29 December 1847; Berezów Niżny, Austrian Empire (now Nyzhniy Bereziv, Ukraine)
- Died: 2 January 1917 (aged 69); Lemberg, Kingdom of Galicia and Lodomeria, Austria-Hungary (now Lviv, Ukraine)
- Education: Academy of Fine Arts Vienna

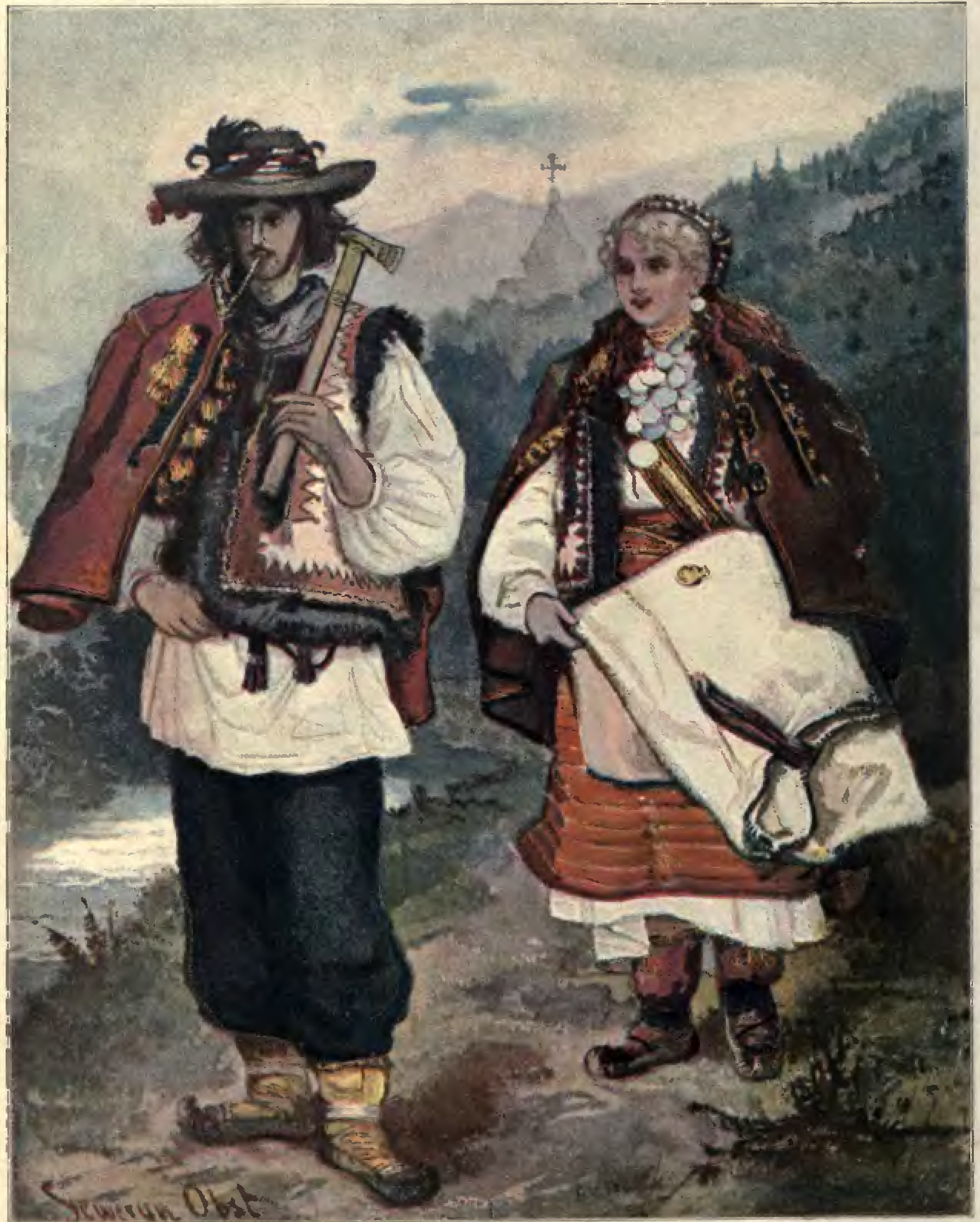
Hutsul Couple by Seweryn Obst, 1902

Seweryn Leopold Obst (29 December 1847 – 2 January 1917) was a Polish painter, illustrator, and ethnographer.

== Life ==
Seweryn Obst was born in Berezów Niżny, now Nyzhniy Bereziv, Kosiv Raion, Ukraine.

Obst attended several local schools throughout Galicia and Volhynia, then in 1864 went to study at the Academy of Fine Arts, in Vienna, where he studied with Karl von Blaas and Eduard von Engerth. He also took private lessons from Christian Ruben. In 1874 he returned home and made his living painting portraits for noble families, including the Buhosevyches of Bukovina and the Zadurovyches of Tlumach Raion.

From childhood he had a fondness for the Hutsul region, and he settled there for several years, living in Verkhovyna and Yaremche. He not only painted scenes from the lives of the Hutsuls, but also collected folk stories and objects and did ethnographic studies. With some of what he saw, he created two albums of sketches of decorative motifs from metal-working, carving, weaving, and embroidery. These albums were presented to the Dzieduszycki Museum in Lwów.

He moved to Lwów (now Lviv, Ukraine, then officially Lemberg) in 1883 and created illustrations for numerous books about peasant arts and crafts. Some were used by Wołodymyr Szuchewycz in his notable study of the Hutsuls. Until 1898, he maintained a workshop where he also taught painting. He exhibited throughout the region and in London. After 1910, he lived in a retirement home for artists. A major retrospective was held in 1912. He died in Lemberg.

== See also ==
- List of Poles
