= Shepherd's axe =

Axe-like weapon use by shepherds

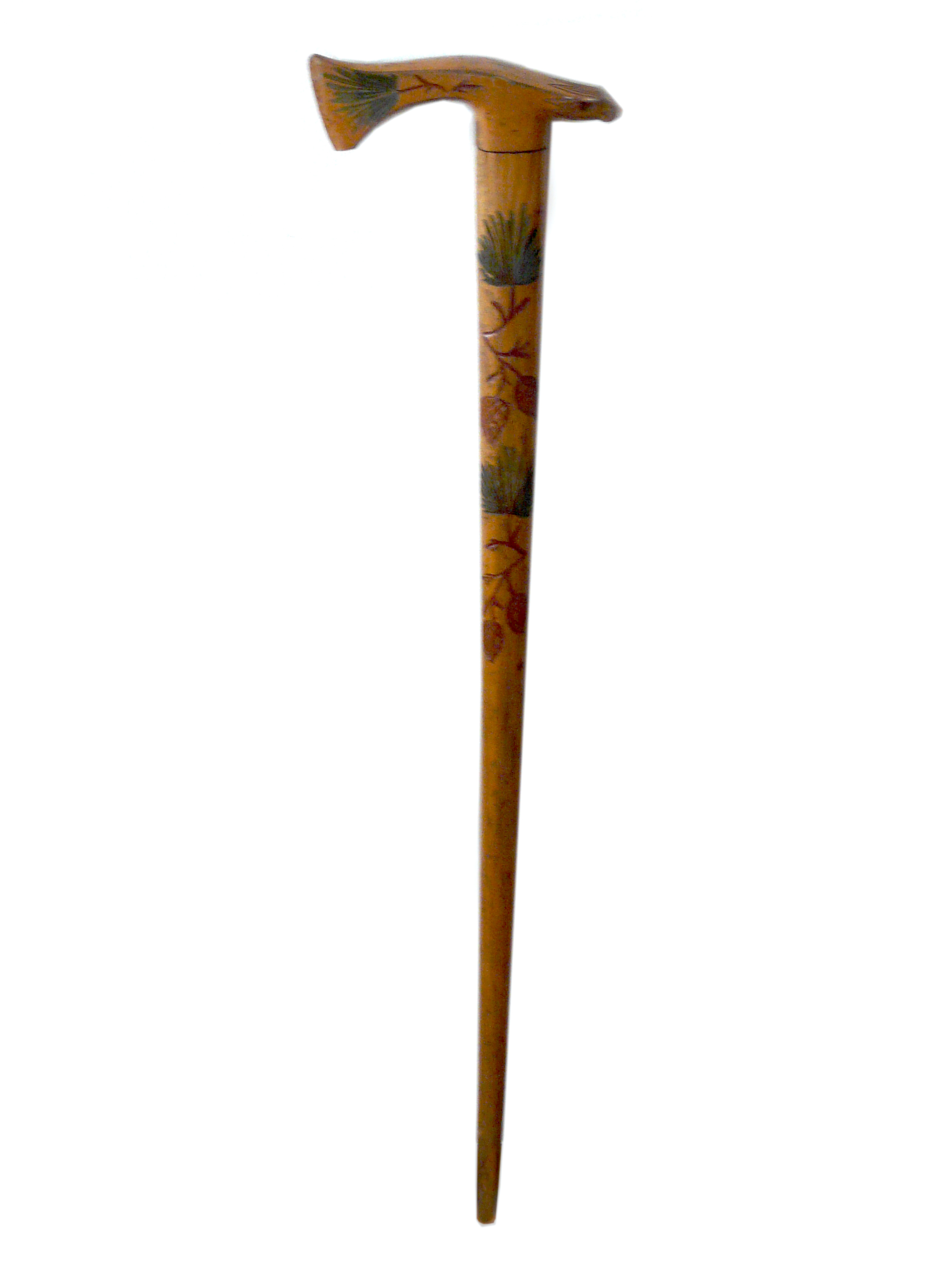
All-wood decorative replica of a ciupaga (Polish shepherd's axe)

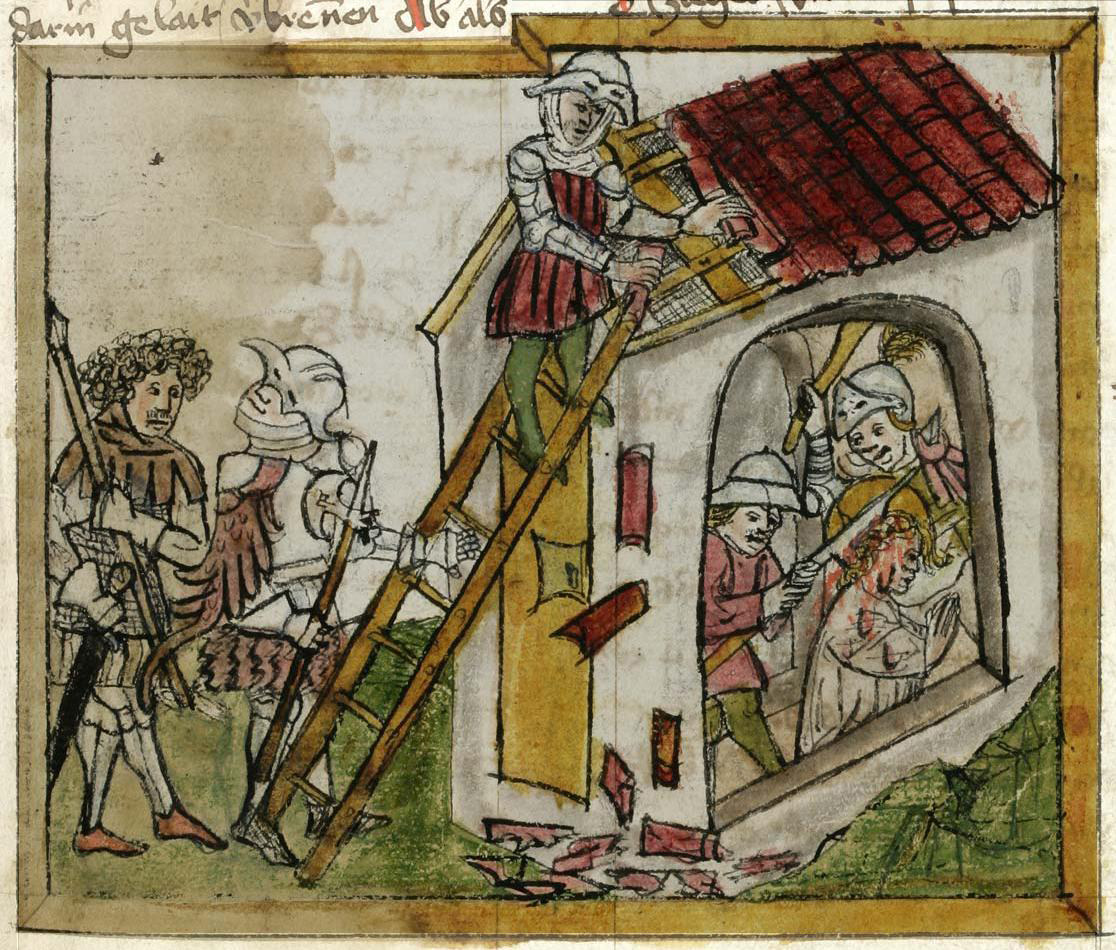
The Martyrdom of Saint Wiborada, c. 1451.(killed by a fokos)

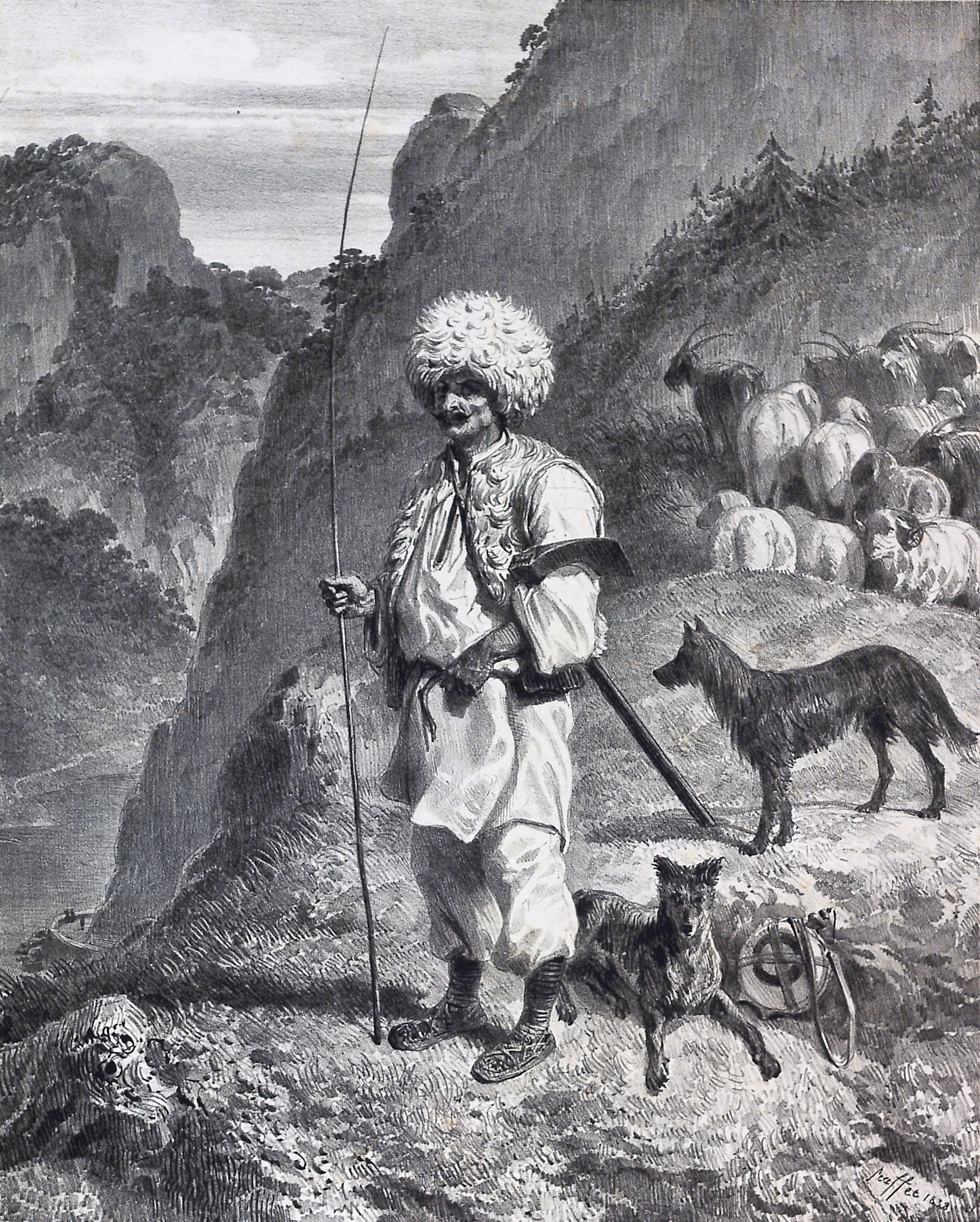
Romanian ("Vlach") shepherd in Banat, sporting a shepherd's axe (Auguste Raffet, c. 1837)

The shepherd's axe is a long thin light axe of Eurasian origin used in past centuries by shepherds in the Carpathian Mountains and in other territories which comprise today Slovakia, Czech Republic, Poland, Ukraine, Romania and Hungary. The features of a shepherd's axe combine a tool with a walking stick, that could be used as a light weapon. It has symbolic historical and cultural connotations and is still used as a prop in many traditional dances, for example the odzemek.

== Names ==
Depending on the language, the axe is called as follows: Hungarian: fokos; Czech: valaška; Polish (depending on the region): ciupaga, rąbanica, obuszek, cekanka, wałaszka (Note: In some sources the names wataha, wataszka appears; by that, some scholars attempt to trace their origin from Romanian vătaf ("master shepherd"). In fact, those names had been created as a result of mistake; see Juliusz Zborowski (1954). "Od wałaski do watażki". Język Polski (in Polish). XXXIV (2): 125–128.); Romanian: baltag, secure; Rusyn: валашка, valaška; Slovak: valaška; Ukrainian: бартка, bartka, топірець, topirets').

== Appearance ==
A shepherd's axe is a light axe with a long and straight wooden shaft, often with a metal butt. The length of the shaft is usually slightly more than 1 metre. The shafts were usually engraved as their owners had plenty of time for crafting.

A small metal head-piece is sharp on one side while the other side is flat and can be used as a hammer. The head-piece is formed to fit comfortably into the hand so the shepherd's axe could be used as a walking stick.

Today's shepherd's axes are mostly decorative, some having golden or silver head-pieces (mostly brass, iron, chromed iron, wood or aluminum – it is rare that any axe head would be made of solid gold or silver). Many are considered works of art (esp. those made up to the 1960s by highlanders). They were skillfully stamped/adorned according to ancient tradition. The main motifs were the sun, stars (whirl), comets, tree of life, flowers, trees such as fir or spruce, and various geometric designs. Some smiths used many different, elaborate stamps.

== History and usage ==
The first written mention of the shepherd's axe comes from Emperor Qin Shi Huang's court. It is also depicted on Scythian imagery (see sagaris). The first users of the shepherd's axe were Eurasian nomads. Many of them were found in Avar graves. Besides the common Eastern steppe varieties, Avar influence too can be felt on the Hungarian shepherd's axes.

In the 9th century, Magyar warriors used light axes on long shafts, called fokos, in their military arsenal during their invasion of Central Europe. Apart from them, the Bulgars and also the Alans and Slavs used similar weapons.

Vlach shepherds brought their shepherd's axes into Central Europe when they migrated along the Carpathian Mountains and Dinaric Mountains from the 14th through 17th centuries. These were used by shepherds as versatile tools, providing a small axe, a supplemental hammer and a walking stick. Although a shepherd's axe could not be used to effectively cut down heavy trees, it was still able to cut smaller branches.

In Slovakia and Poland, shepherd's axes were inseparable tools of native shepherds, together with heavy decorative belts. In the Slovak culture, the shepherd's axe was popularized by local historical legend Juraj Jánošík.

In Hungary, modified axes were also used as martial weapons by Hungarian warriors in the early modern period, used, for example, in the 18th century in Rákóczi's War for Independence against Austrian soldiers. In the 17th and 18th centuries, Hungarian Kuruc leader Imre Thököly and his soldiers used shepherd's axes as weapons. Hungarian shepherds in the northern regions used them also as tools.

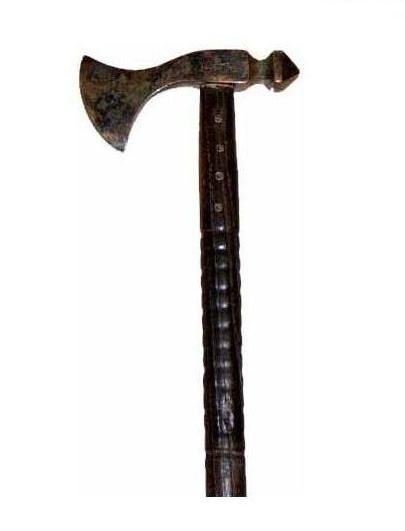
A Shepherd's Axe (or fokos in Hungarian) from Rákóczi's War for Independence

Many people of the Halychyna region were depicted holding bartka, particularly members of the local peasant resistance of the 19th century known as opryshky, often being associated with their more prominent leader Oleksa Dovbush.

== Present-day usage ==
At present, shepherd's axes are still made and sold as souvenirs and for decorative purposes. They are also still used in many traditional dances. Occasionally they may be seen in the rural parts of the country where older men still use them as walking sticks.

== Gallery ==
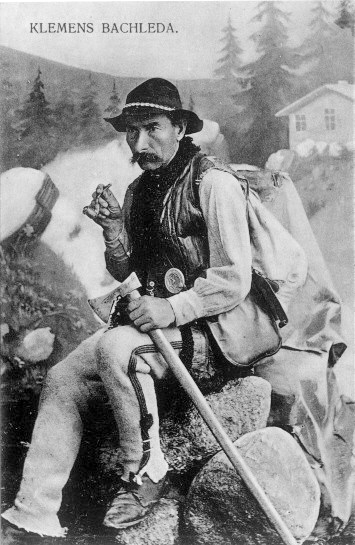
Klemens Bachleda holding a ciupaga

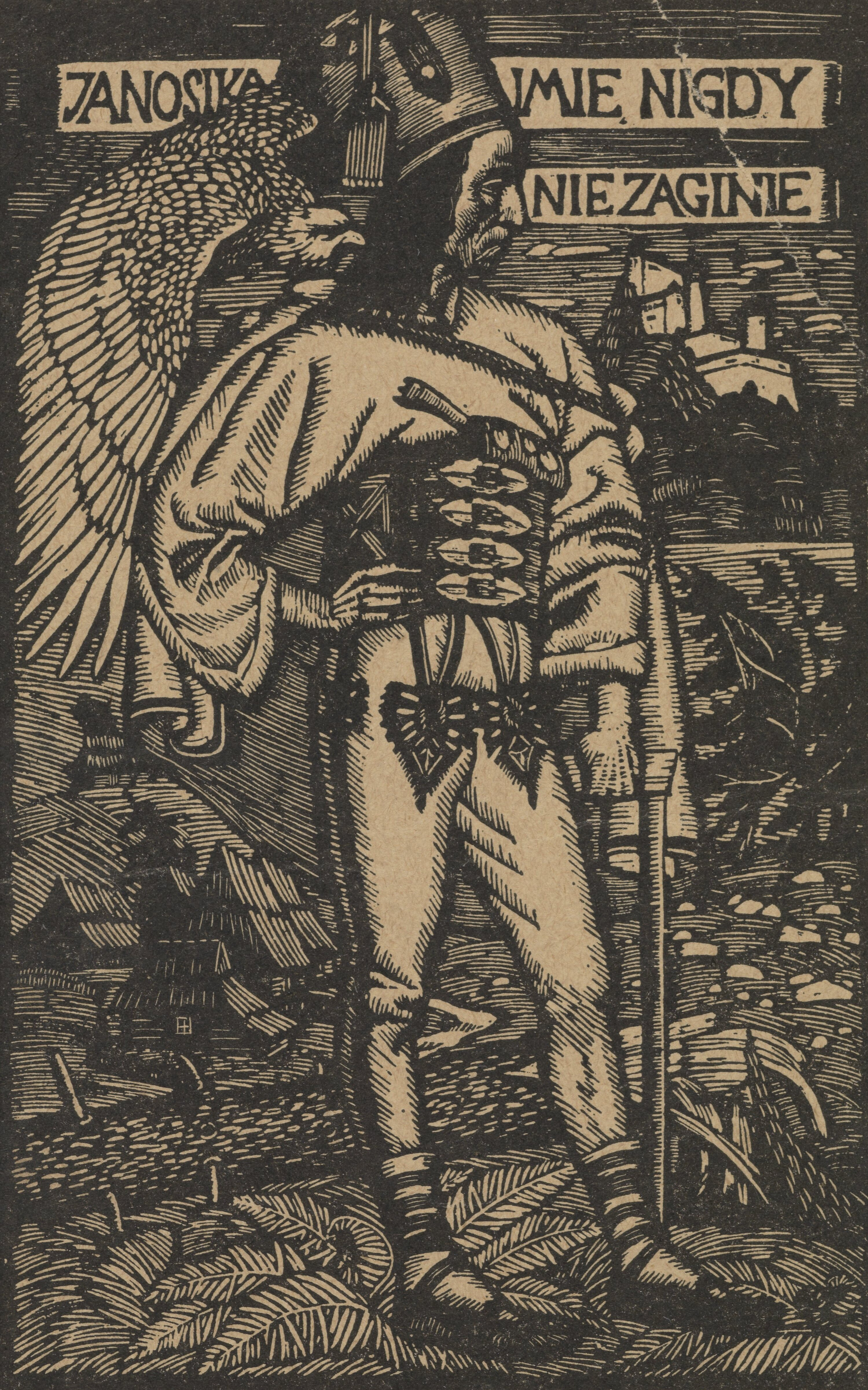
Juraj Jánošík holding his valaška

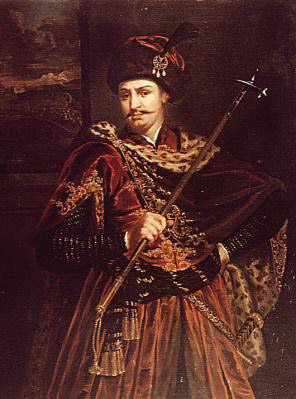
Imre Thököly holding a modified fokos

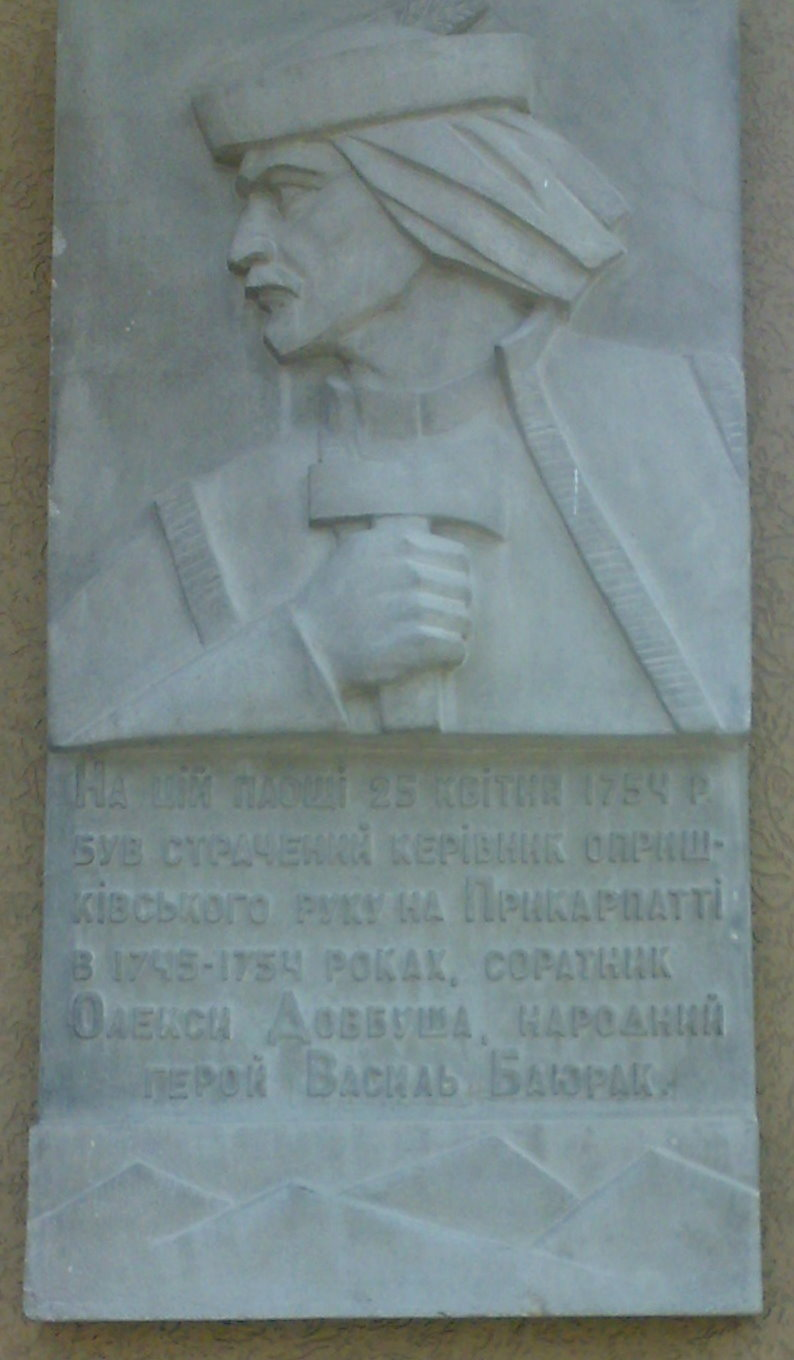
Opryshok Vasyl Bayurak holding bartka

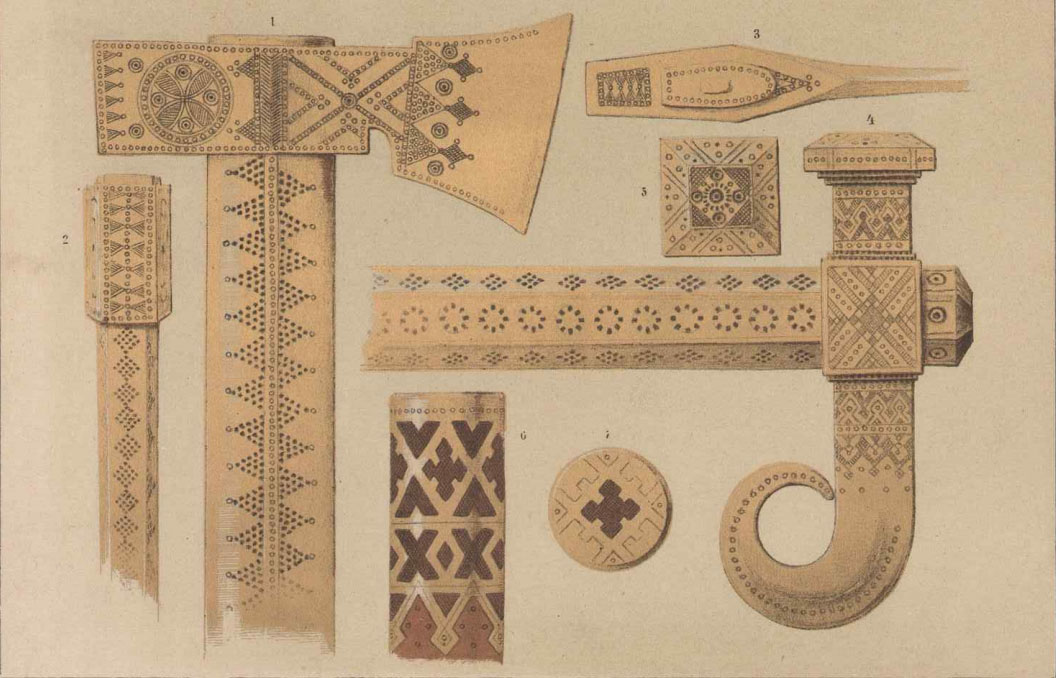
Depiction of bartka by Severyn Obst (1882)
