= Hutsuls =

Ethnic group in the Carpathian Mountains

гуцули
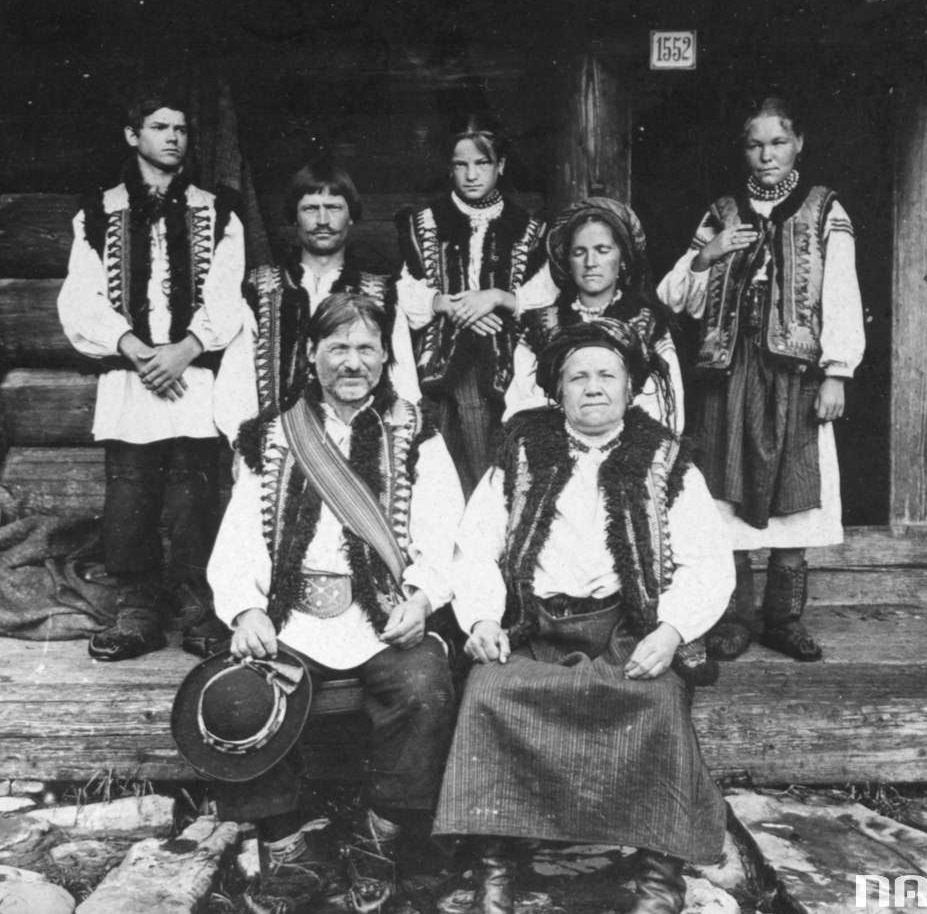
- Hutsul family from Verkhovyna (modern Ivano-Frankivsk Oblast, Ukraine), 1925–1939

Total population
- >26,400

Regions with significant populations
- Ukraine: 23,900 (2001)
- Romania: At least 2,500

Languages
- Hutsul dialect, Rusyn language, Ukrainian, Romanian

Religion
- Predominantly Ukrainian Greek Catholic or Eastern Orthodox

Related ethnic groups
- Boykos, Lemkos, Rusyns, Pokutians

The Hutsuls (Note: Ukrainian: гуцули, romanized: hutsuly, Ukrainian pronunciation: [ɦʊˈt͡sulɪ]; Rusyn: гуцулы; Polish: Huculi, Hucułowie; Romanian: huțuli; singular - Hutsul (гуцул, Ukrainian pronunciation: [ɦʊˈt͡sul]; Hutsul dialect - [ˈɦut͡sʊl])) are an East Slavic ethnic group spanning parts of western Ukraine and northern Romania (i.e. parts of Bukovina and Maramureș).

In Ukraine, they have often been officially and administratively designated a subgroup of Ukrainians, and, among Ukrainian scholars, are largely regarded as constituting part of the broader Ukrainian ethnicity. However, in the eyes of some scholars and of some Hutsuls, they are either their own nation, or a part of the Rusyn nation, alongside the closely related ethnic groups of Boykos and Lemkos.

== Etymology ==
The origin of the name Hutsul is uncertain. The most common derivations are from the Romanian word for "outlaw" (cf. Rom. hoț "thief", hoțul "the thief"), and the Slavic kochul (Ukr. kochovyk "nomad") which is a reference to the semi-nomadic shepherd lifestyle of the inhabitants who fled into the mountains after the Mongol invasion. Other proposed derivations include from the Turkic tribe of the Utsians or Uzians, and even to the name of the Moravian Grand Duke Hetsyla. As the name is first attested in 1816, it is considered to be of recent origin and as an exonym, used by neighboring groups and not Hutsuls themselves, although some have embraced it. The region inhabited by Hutsuls is named as Hutsulshchyna. Their name is also found in the name of Hutsul Alps, Hutsul Beskyd, Hutsulshchyna National Park, and the National Museum of Hutsulshchyna and Pokuttia Folk Art.

== Geography ==
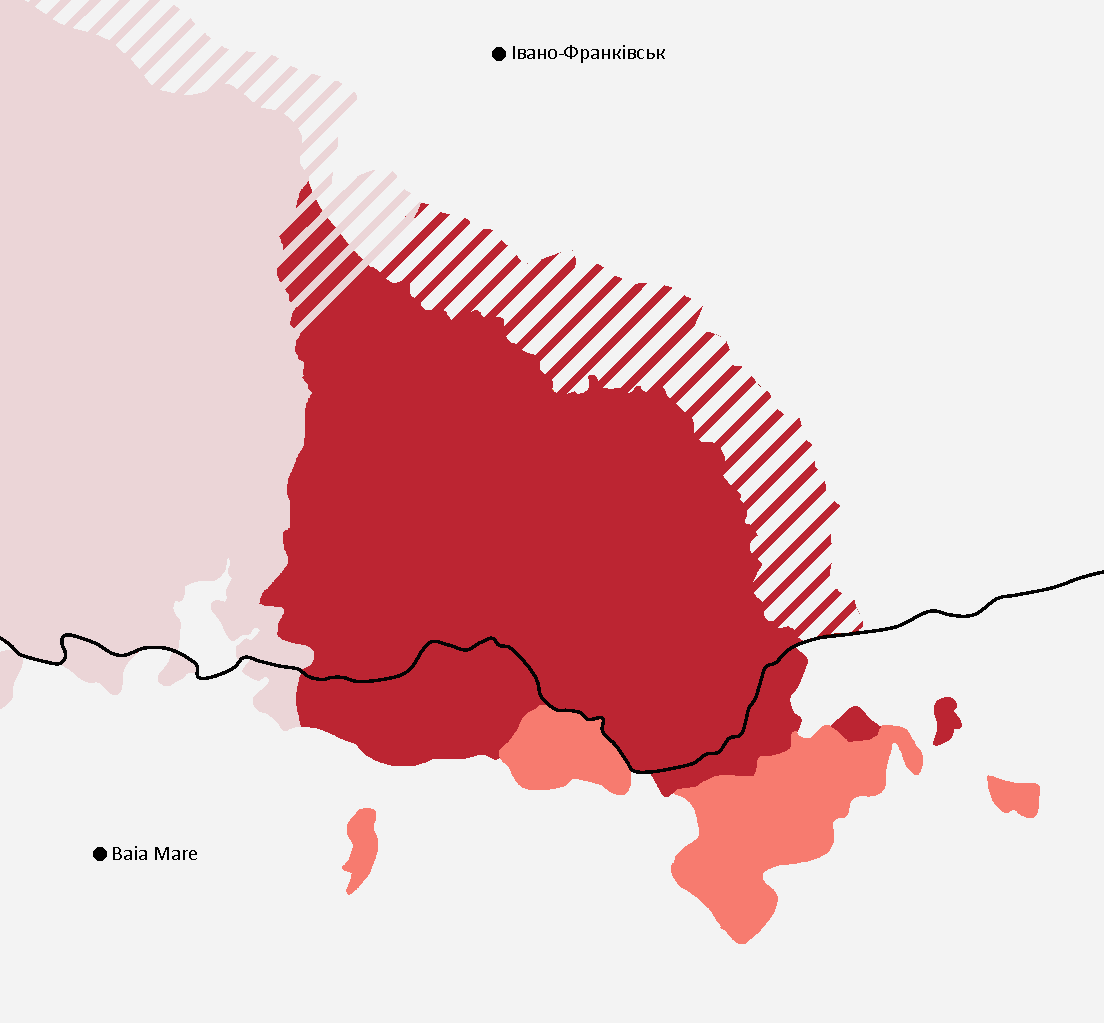
Geographic extent of Hutsulshchyna (red) on both sides of the Ukrainian-Romanian border (black)

The territory historically inhabited by Hutsuls is known in Ukrainian as Hutsulshchyna (Ukrainian: Гуцульщина). It encompasses parts of the historical regions of Halychyna, Bukovyna and Zakarpattia, spanning across the basins of rivers Prut, Cheremosh, Seret, as well as the upper flows of Suchava, Bystrytsia Nadvirnianska and Tysa. In the southeast Hutsul ethnic territory borders areas populated by Romanians, in the west - Boykos, and in the north and south its territory is bordered by several river valleys and the Carpathian Mountains. The historical western border of Hutsul territory is traditionally delimited by the settlements of Deliatyn, Bystrytsia, Zelena and, according to some authors, Pasichna, and in Zakarpattia - the villages of Dilove and Kosivska Poliana. Hutsul population is also present in some villages of Romanian Marmarosh region.

== History ==
=== Origins ===
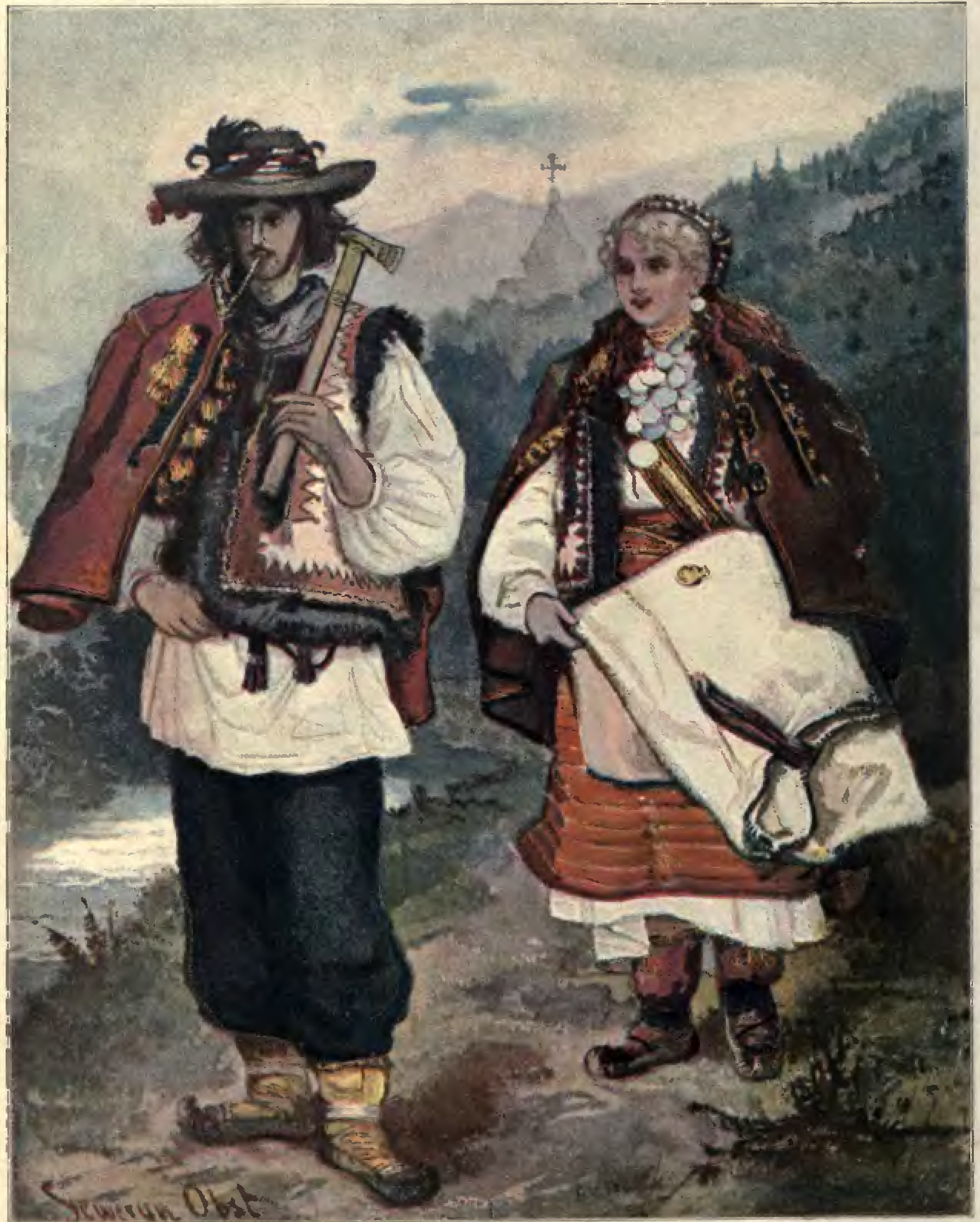
Painting of a Hutsul man and woman in 1902 by Seweryn Obst.

Hutsuls inhabit areas situated between the south-east of those inhabited by the Boykos, down to the northern part of the Romanian segment of the Carpathians. Several hypotheses account for the origin of the Hutsuls; however, like all the Rusyns, they most probably have a diverse ethnogenetic origin. They are generally considered to be descendants of the White Croats, a Slavic tribe that inhabited the area, also Tivertsi, and possibly Ulichs who had to leave their previous home near the Southern Bug river under pressure from the Pechenegs. There is also considered a relation to Vlach shepherds who later immigrated from Transylvania, because of which some scholars like Romanian historian Nicolae Iorga argued that "huțuli" or "huțani" are denationalized Vlachs / Romanians.

=== Early history ===
First historical information about Hutsuls appears in Polish chronicles from the 14-15th centuries. The Hutsul settlement of Zhabye is first mentioned in 1424. The territory populated by Hutsuls was frequently engulfed by rebellions against the Polish rule, such as the Mukha uprising of 1490, and during the Polish-Moldavian Wars local nobility fought on the side of Moldavia. In 1648 the uprising led by Semen Vysochan, a supporter of Bohdan Khmelnytskyi, spread around the area. Starting from the late 17th century, gangs of opryshky were active in the territory populated by Hutsuls, with their most notable leader being Oleksa Dovbush from Pechenizhyn.

=== Modern era ===
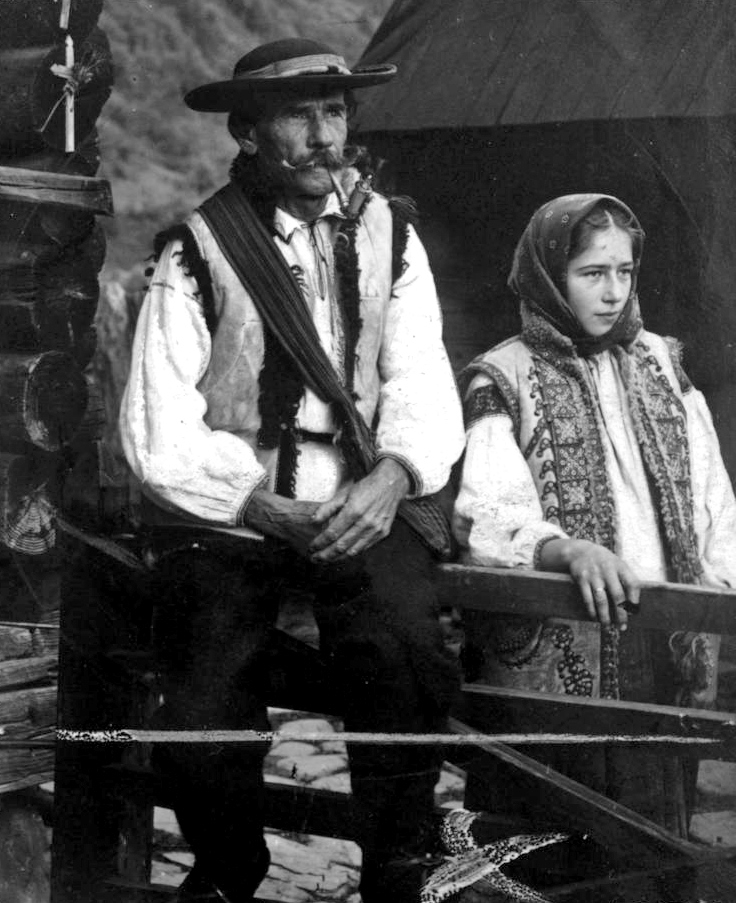
Hutsul family in Verkhovyna, 1933.

Until the 1770s the lands of Hutsulshchyna were divided between Poland, Turkish Moldavia and Hungary. Following the establishment of Austrian rule numerous uprisings against serfdom took place in the area, the most important of which took place during the 1840s under the leadership of Lukian Kobylytsia. In the following decades Hutsuls were influenced by the ideas of Ukrainian national revival, which included the creation of the Ukrainian Radical Party and formation of the Ukrainian Sich Riflemen. A volunteer Hutsul-Bukovyna Legion of the Austrian army was created in 1915-1916. In 1918-1920 Hutsuls took an active part in the Ukrainian War of Independence. In 1919 a Hutsul kurin fought as part of the XI (Sambir) brigade of the Ukrainian Galician Army, distinguishing itself during the offensive in Galicia and in course of the following Battle of Vapniarka, when it was subordinated to the army of the Ukrainian People's Republic.

According to the 1930 Romanian census, in Romania within its borders at that time, including northern Bukovina, currently a part of Ukraine, there were 12,456 Hutsuls. According to the Romanian census of 1941, in addition to the mostly (51.2%) self-identified ethnically Ukrainian population of Northern Bukovina, almost all the 6,767 inhabitants of the Seletyn district (plasa) were self-identified ethnic Hutsuls.

In the 1996 elections to the Romanian Chamber of Deputies, the General Union of the Associations of the Hutsul Ethnicity (Uniunea Generala a Asociatiilor Etniei Hutule) obtained 646 votes (0.01% of the total). In the 2000 elections to the Romanian Chamber of Deputies, the General Union of the Associations of the Hutsul Ethnicity (Uniunea Generala a Asociatiilor Etniei Hutule) obtained 1225 votes out of 10,839,424 votes (0.01% of the total). According to the representatives of the Hutsuls, in the 2002 census, they "preferred to declare themselves Romanians in order not to be included in the category of Ukrainians".

== Language ==
In Ukraine, Hutsul dialect is classified among Southwestern Ukrainian dialects, with its closest counterparts being the Pokuttia-Bukovyna, Boiko and Middle Zakarpattian dialects. However, all three are also often classified as either their own languages or as dialects of Rusyn.

Since the annexation of western Ukraine regions, including Ivano-Frankivsk and Chernivtsi Oblast as well as Transcarpathia by the Soviet Union, compulsory education has been conducted only in standardized literary Ukrainian. In recent years there have been grassroots efforts to keep the traditional Hutsul dialect alive.

== Religion and culture ==
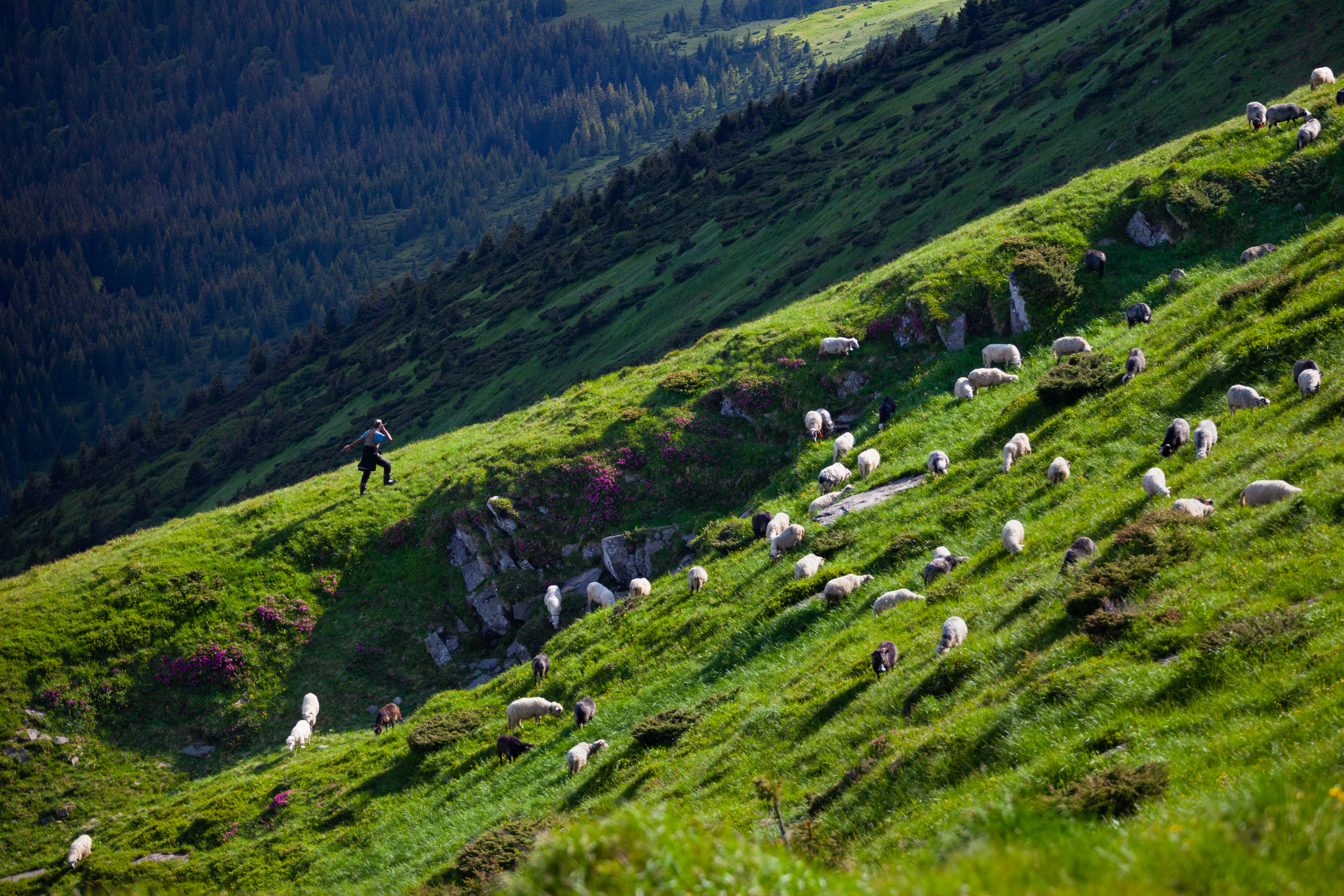
Herding of sheep on a polonyna in the Ukrainian Carpathians

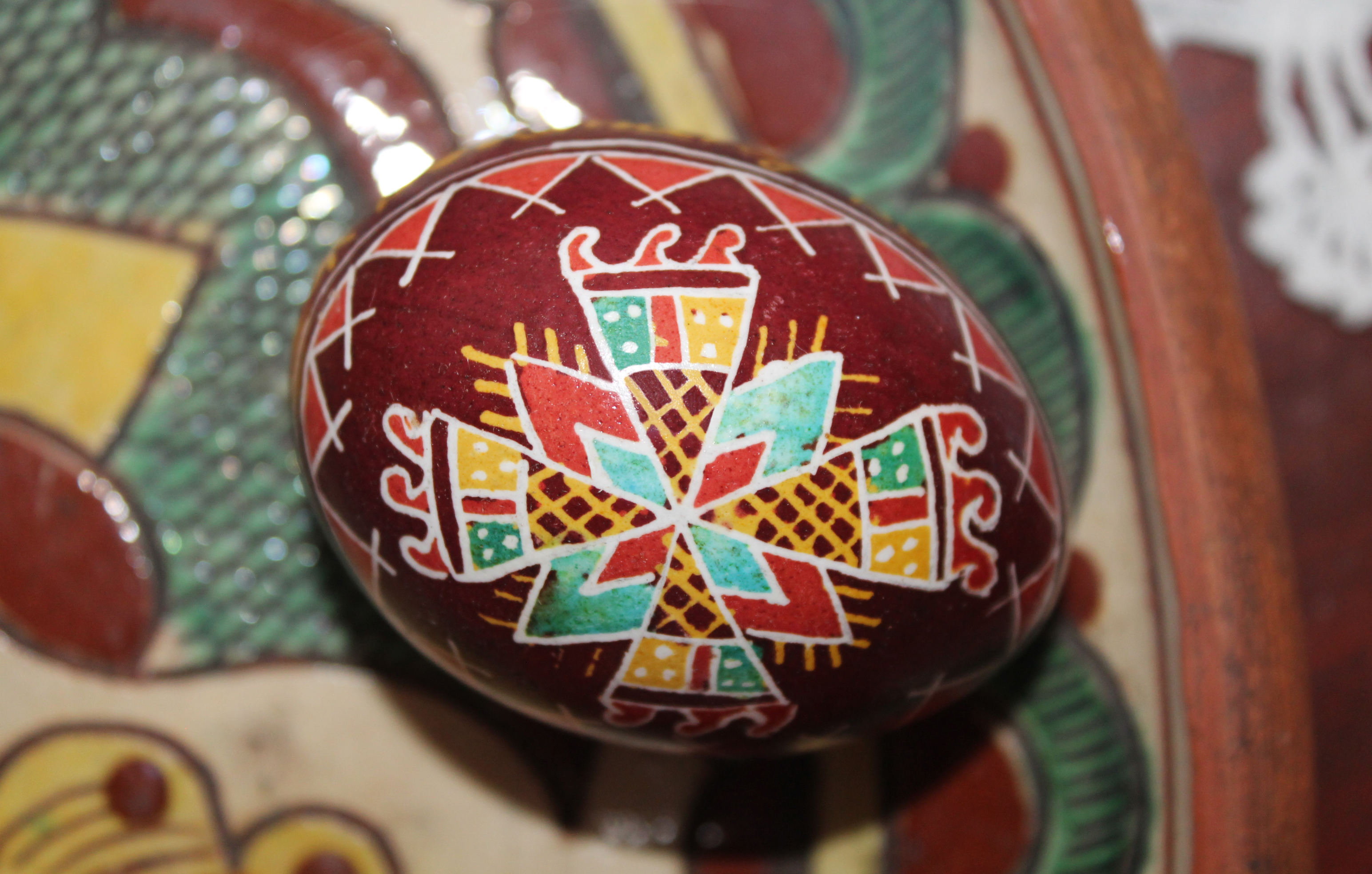
Hutsul pysanka (Easter egg)

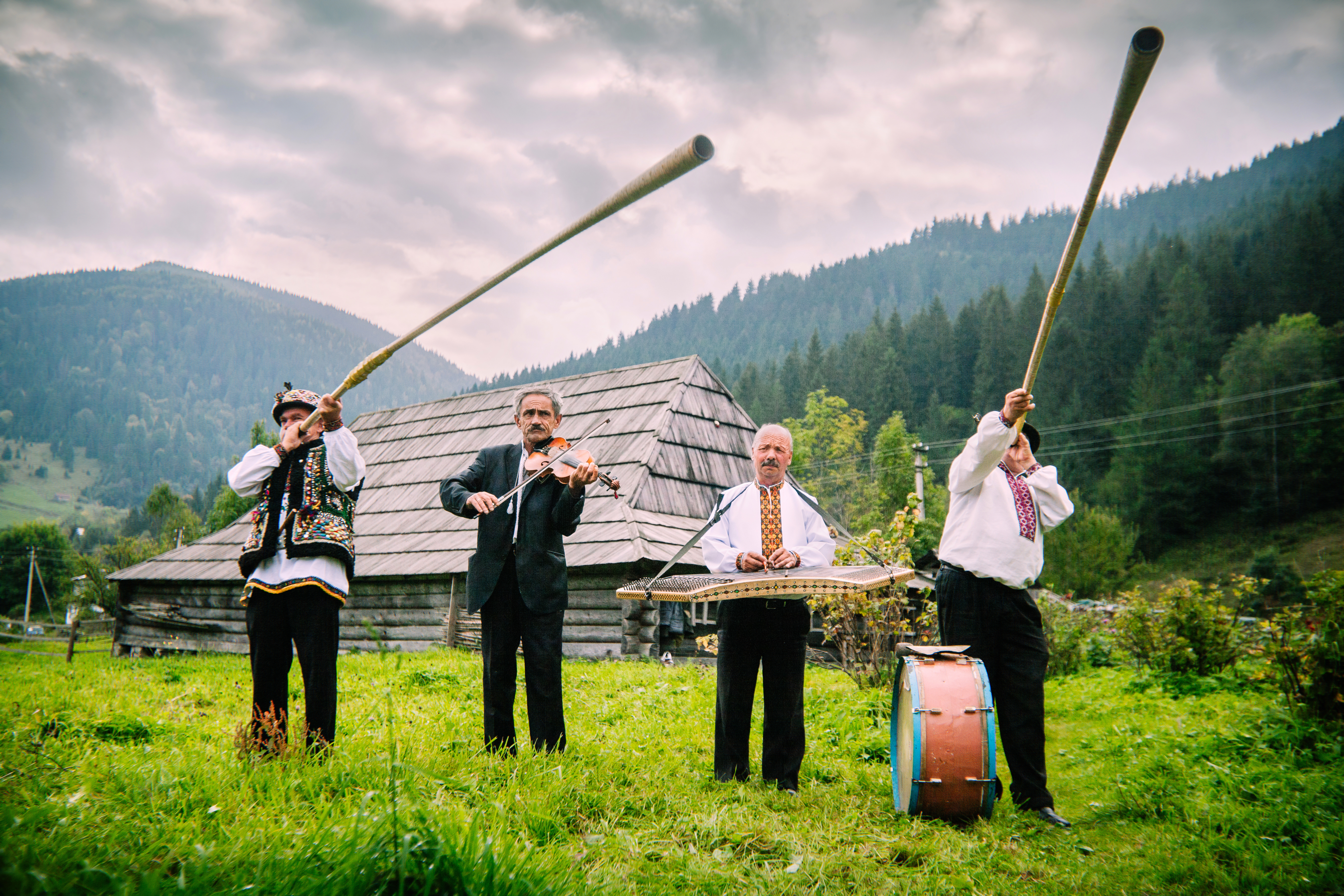
Hutsul musicians with trembitas

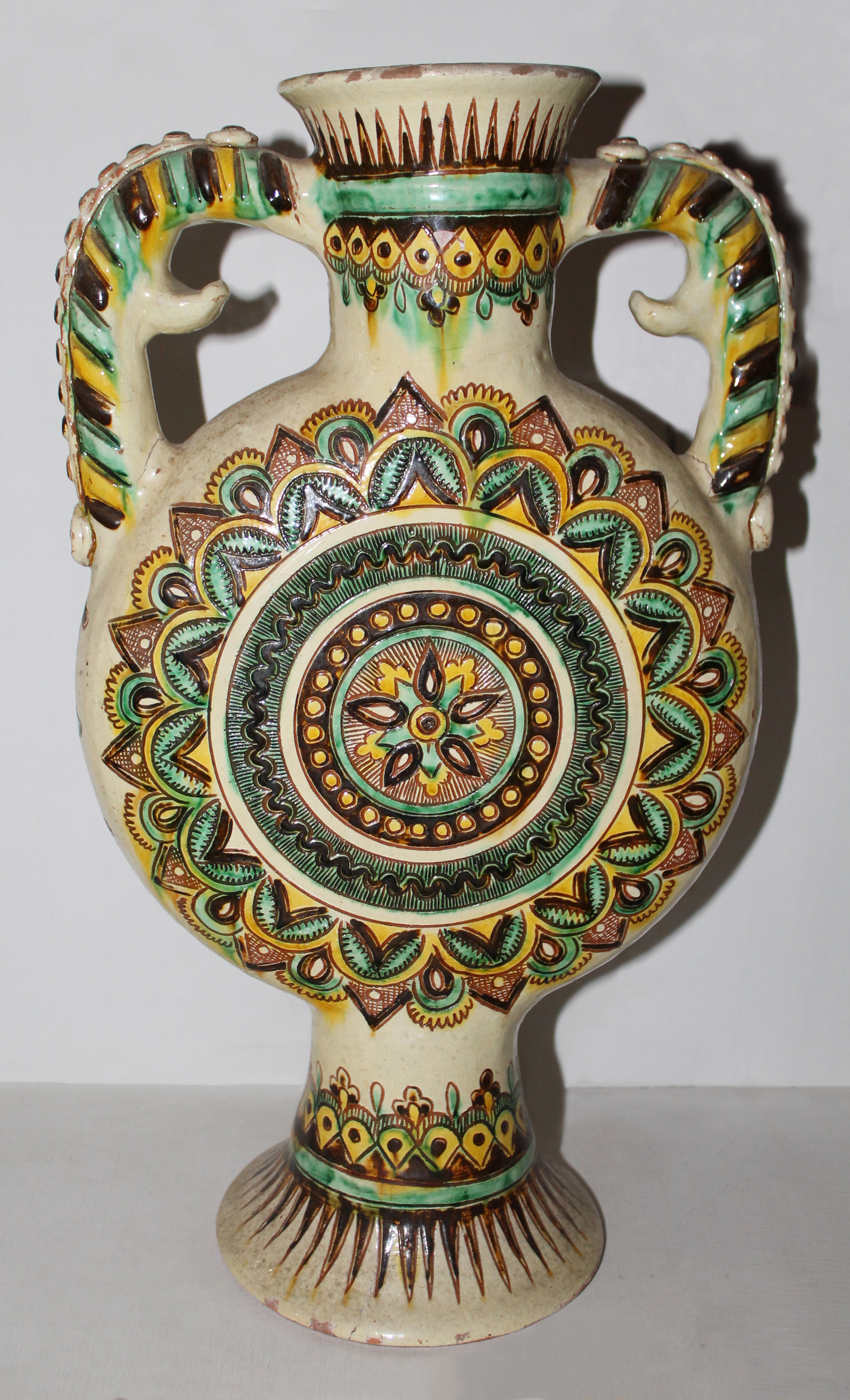
A decorated Hutsul drinking vessel

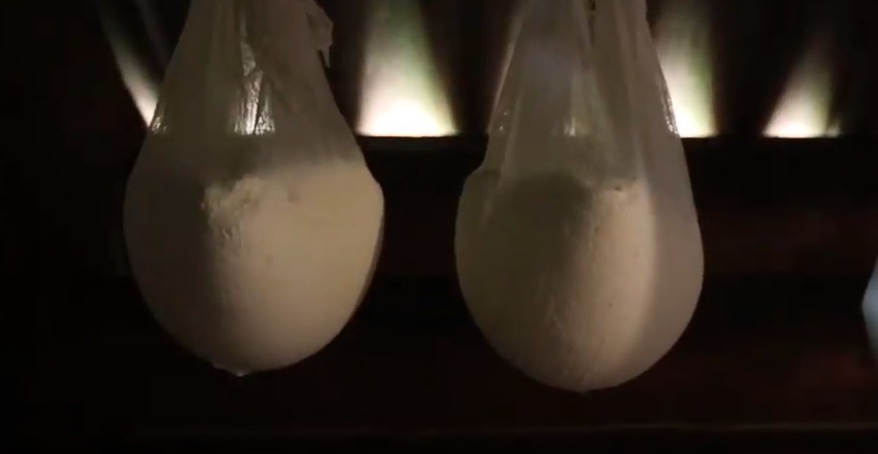
Hutsul sheep cheese (bryndzia)

Ukrainian Hutsul culture bears a resemblance to neighboring cultures of western and southwestern Ukraine, particularly Lemkos and Boykos. These groups also share similarities with other Slavic highlander peoples, such as the Gorals in Poland and Slovakia. Similarities have also been noted with some Vlach cultures such as the Moravian Wallachians in the Czech Republic, as well as some cultures in Romania. Most Hutsuls belong to the Ukrainian Greek Catholic Church and the Ukrainian Orthodox Church.

=== Way of life ===
Hutsul society was traditionally based on forestry and logging, as well as cattle and sheep breeding; the Hutsuls are credited with having created the breed of horse known as the Hucul pony. One of the main attributes of Hutsuls' is their shepherd's axe (bartka), a small axe with a long handle that is still used to this day for chopping wood, as a cane, for fighting and traditional ceremonies. They would often be intricately decorated with traditional wood carving designs and passed on from generation to generation especially upon marriage.

=== Crafts ===
Traditional Hutsul culture is often represented by the colorful and intricate craftsmanship of their clothing, sculpture, architecture, woodworking, metalworking (especially in brass), rug weaving (see lizhnyk), pottery (see Kosiv ceramics), and egg decorating (see pysanka). Along with other Hutsul traditions, as well as their songs and dances, this culture is often celebrated and highlighted by the different countries that Hutsuls inhabit.

=== Music ===
Hutsuls use unique musical instruments, including the "trembita" (trâmbiţa), a type of alpenhorn, as well multiple varieties of the fife, or sopilka, that are used to create unique folk melodies and rhythms. Also frequently used are the duda (bagpipe), the drymba (Jew's harp), and the tsymbaly (hammered dulcimer).

=== Architecture ===
Hutsul architecture preserves traits and forms unique for the region. Hutsul settlements tend to be dispersed across large areas, with permanent residences (grazhda) being constructed at elevations of up to 1,700 meters above sea level. Such residences were built as fortified locations protected from wild animals and equipped against enemy attacks. In some cases several generations of one family could live in a grazhda. Many Hutsul buildings have a seasonal nature, being used for accommodation of herdsmen during the pasturing season. Hutsuls are also known for thir intricate wooden churches, such as the ones in Kryvorivnia, Vorokhta and Yasinia.

=== Cultural influence ===
The Hutsuls served as an inspiration for many artists, such as writers Ivan Franko, Lesya Ukrainka, Mykhailo Kotsiubynsky, Vasyl Stefanyk, Marko Cheremshyna, Mihail Sadoveanu and Stanisław Vincenz, and painters such as Kazimierz Sichulski and Teodor Axentowicz—noted for his portraits and subtle scenes of Hutsul life—and Halyna Zubchenko. In 1911 an amateur Hutsul theatre was organized by Hnat Khotkevych, with Les Kurbas later serving as its director. Sergei Parajanov's 1965 film Shadows of Forgotten Ancestors (Тіні забутих предків), which is based on the book by Mykhailo Kotsiubynsky, portrays scenes of traditional Hutsul life. Composer Ludmila Anatolievna Yaroshevskaya composed a work for piano based on Hutsul folk music (Fantasy on Hutsul Themes).

=== Cultural events and exhibitions ===
Every summer, the village of Sheshory in Ukraine hosts a three-day international festival of folk music and art. Two Hutsul-related museums are located in Kolomyia, Ukraine: the Pysanka museum and the Museum of Hutsul and Pokuttia Folk Art. Traditional Hutsul sounds and moves were used by the Ukrainian winner of the 2004 Eurovision Song Contest, Ruslana Lyzhychko.

The Romanian Hutsuls have a Festival of Hutsuls at the Moldova-Sulița village in Suceava county.

== Notable people ==
- Marko Cheremshyna, writer
- Oleksa Dovbush, leader of opryshky movement
- Fiїnka, actress and singer-songwriter
- Vasile Hutopilă, painter
- Volodymyr Ivasyuk, composer
- Stepan Klochurak, politician and leader of the Hutsul Republic
- Lukian Kobylytsia, peasant rebel and member of the Austrian Parliament
- Elisabeta Lipă, multiple world and Olympic rowing champion
- Ivan Malkovych, publisher
- Dmytro Pavlychko, Ukrainian poet and politician
- Solomiia Pavlychko, Ukrainian literary critic and feminist
- Paraska Plytka-Horytsvit, artist
- Ruslana, Ukrainian singer
- Matei Vișniec, playwright
- Mickola Vorokhta, painter, Merited Artist of Ukraine, born in the historical Hutsul city of Rakhiv
- Mariya Yaremchuk, singer
- Nazariy Yaremchuk, singer

== See also ==
- 49th Hutsul Rifle Regiment
- Hutsul Republic
- Hutsulka Ksenya
- Kolomyjka, also known as hutsulka
- Grazhda
- Galicia (Eastern Europe)
