= Volodymyr Shukhevych =

Ukrainian writer and ethnographer (1849–1915)

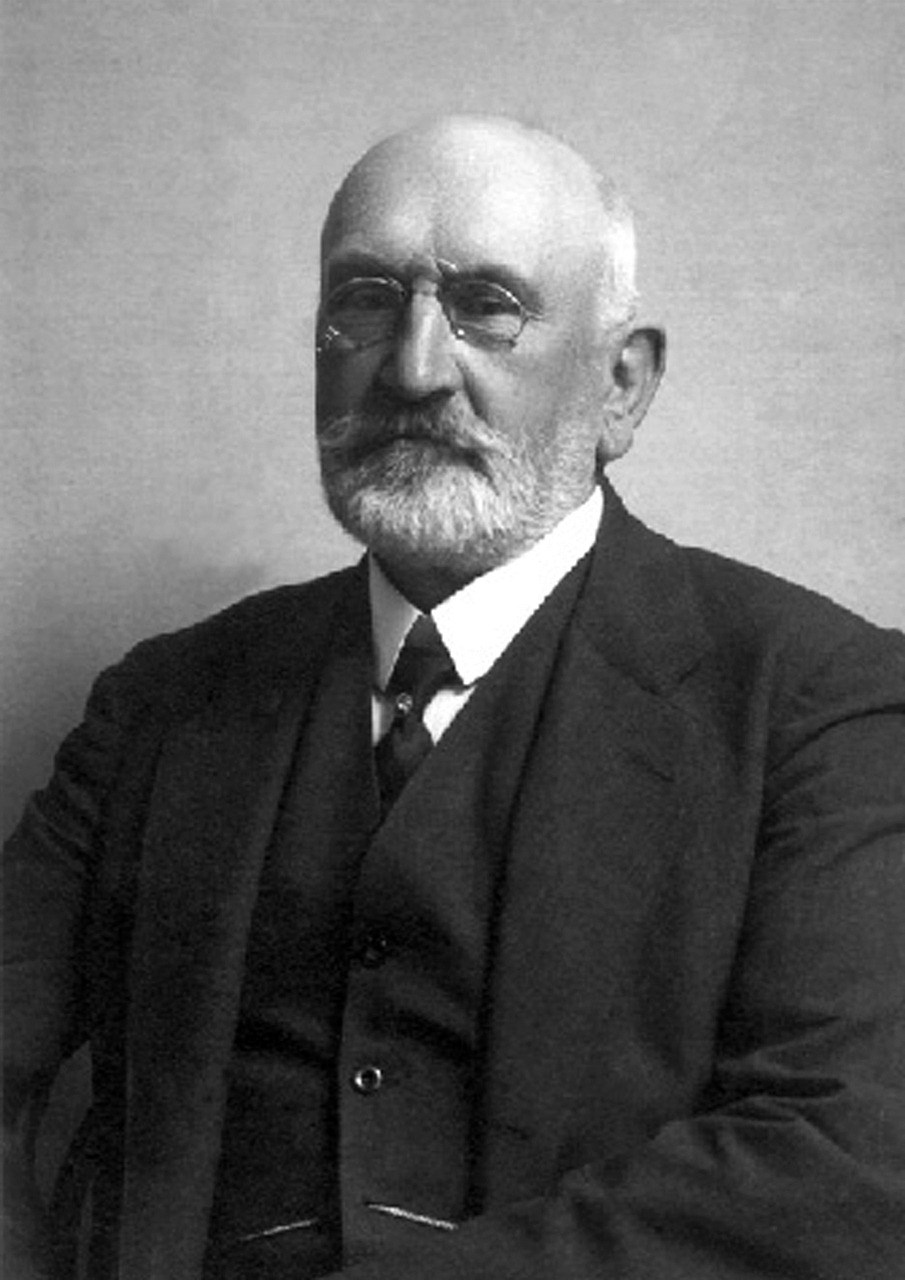
Volodymyr Shukhevych

Volodymyr Osypovych Shukhevych (Ukrainian: Володи́мир О́сипович Шухе́вич, pseudonym, V. Sh. Shumylo, Ukrainian: Шумило, В.Ш.) (15 March 1849, Tyshkivtsi village, Horodenkyi district, Ivano-Frankivsk region, Austrian Empire – 10 April 1915, Lviv, Austria-Hungary) – was a Ukrainian public figure, writer, ethnographer and teacher.

== Biography ==
Volodymyr Shukhevych was born in the small village of Tyshkivtsi to Fr. Iosyff and Anna (née Kulchutska).

He studied at gymnasia in Kolomyia, Stanislav and Chernivtsi. In 1877 he graduated Lviv University. In 1880 he began working as a secondary school teacher of zoology, geology, mathematics etc. at Lviv gymnasium. He occupied this position till 1913.

He was a close friend of Ivan Franko, Mykhailo Kotsiubynskyi, Mykola Lysenko, Mykhailo Pavlyk, Osyp Makovey and other known personalities of Ukrainian culture and science.

Volodymyr Shukhevych was married to Hermina, with whom he had five children: Volodymyr, Daria, Yosyp, Iryna and Taras. His daughter Iryna (1881–1934) was married to Dr. Theodor Rozankowski, who was a judge, political and military figure and the first commander of the Legion of Ukrainian Sich Riflemen. His grandson, Roman-Taras Yosypovych Shukhevych (pseudonym, Taras Chuprynka) (30 June 1907 – 5 March 1950) was a Ukrainian politician, military leader and general of the Ukrainian Insurgent Army (UPA).

With introduction of the Soviet government in Ukraine, Volodymyr Shukhevych became a persona non grata. It was forbidden to write about him or to republish his works up until the end of the 20th century.

Volodymyr Shukhevych died on 15 April 1915 and was buried at Lychakiv Cemetery, Lviv.

== Work and cultural activities ==
Zoria newspaper, No.11,1894

Volodymyr Shukhevych founded and led a number of significant public and educational institutions in Ukraine, including "Prosvita" ['enlightenment'], "Ruske Pedahohichne Tovarystvo" ['Rus pedagogical society'], "Ruska Besida" ['Rus conversation'] (was its chairman 1895–1910), "Boyan" (1891) and Lysenko Musical Society (1903–1915). Built the building for the latter. Together with Anatole Vakhnianyn established Union of Singing and Musical Societies.

His activities in the field of publishing include: founder and editor (1890–1895) of children's magazine Dzvinok [‘Bell’], author and publisher of children's books, editor of Uchytel ['teacher'] newspaper (1893–1895). Cooperated with Zoria ['dawn'], Dila ['works'] and other publications.

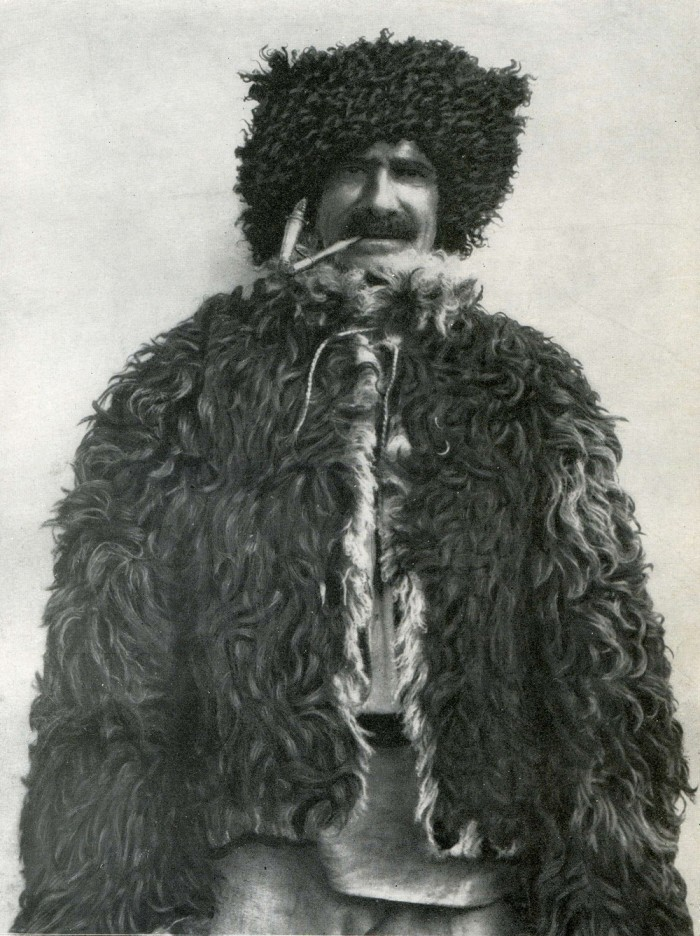
Illustration in V. Shukhevych's Hutsulshchyna, vol. 1, 1899

Together with Count Wlodzimierz Dzieduszycki and Ludwik Wierzbicki, he collected ethnographic materials as well as art and household exhibits of Hutsul region. The result of his studies resulted in a valuable five-volume work Hutsulshchyna (1897–1908) in Ukrainian published by the Shevchenko Scientific Society, and a four-volumes work in Polish (1902–1908), published by The Dzieduszycki Museum (nowadays, State Natural History Museum of the National Academy of Sciences of Ukraine). In the Dzieduszycki Museum Volodymyr Shukhevych established the Natural and Ethnographic Department and was its curator.

Made significant contribution into the preservation and promotion of the Ukrainian culture: organised choir "Boyan" trip to perform in Prague (1891) and the Ethnographic Division at the Halychyna (Galician) Regional Exchibition in Lviv (1894). In 1887, on the occasion of the arrival of Rudolf, Archduke of Austria and Crown Prince of Austria-Hungary, Volodymyr Shukhevych organised ethnographic expedition to the Lviv High Castle.

He was a member of the Shevchenko Scientific Society, Austrian Society of Ethnology (1901) and the Czech Ethnological Society (1903).
