= Opryshky =

Brigand and rebel movement in the Carpathians

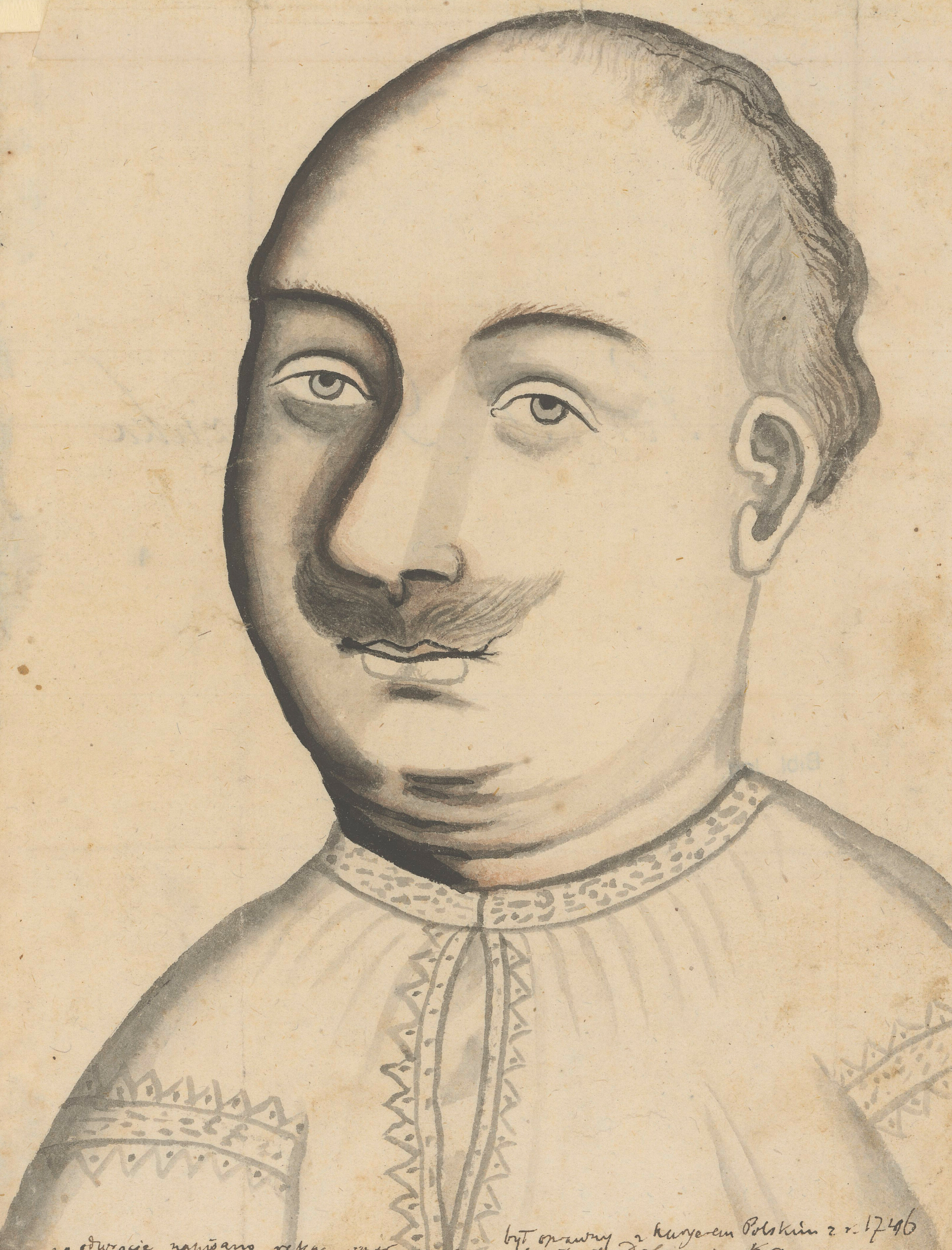
A portrait of famous Opryshky leader Oleksa Dovbush, 1746

Opryshky (Ukrainian: опришки, singular opryshok, опришок) were groups of brigands active in the region of Ukrainian Carpathians between the 16th and early 19th century. Consisting of runaway peasants, noblemen's servants and, in a latter period, dodgers from conscription, they formed small groups headed by individual leaders and attacked noble estates, keeps, tax farmers, tavern keepers, merchants and wealthy peasants. In some cases part of their booty would be distributed among the poorer peasantry. This contributed to the image of Opryshky as popular heroes and protectors of the common folk, which rooted itself in Ukrainian folklore and literature.

The Ukrainian "opryshok" is analogous to the Polish zbójnik and the Balkan hajduk, as similar bands of bandits (often romanticised in folklore and later popular media) were present in other parts of the Carpathian Mountains as well, including the Polish and Slovak Tatras that have birthed the legendary highwayman Juraj Jánošík.

== Name ==
The term "opryshok"/"opryshky" itself started to be used in the 16th century and has an unclear origin: some researchers consider it to be derived from the adverb oprich (Ukrainian: опріч) - "separately", compare to oprichnina; alternatively it could be connected to dialectal words oprysok (оприсок) - "piece of rock", oprysklyvyi (оприскливий) - "bothering", "uneasy", or even to the Latin noun opressor, which used to mean "destroyer" or "violator". The word could also have a Romanian origin. During that period the word had an official connotation, and in Ukrainian folk tradition members of opryshky bands were instead called with the euphemistical term "black boys" (Ukrainian: чорні хлопці).

== History ==
First information about brigand groups in the Carpathian region comes from the mid-15th century. The emergence of opryshky as a social movement was connected with the developments in the 18th-century Poland. The breakdown of central authority during the rule of the Saxon dynasty (1709-1763), led to the rise of powerful magnates, who established full control over the countryside by organizing manorial estates (latifundia) and ruling as local "kinglets" with their own private armies. In the lands of Ruthenia (Galicia), Belz, western Volhynia and western Podolia the peasants bore the greatest burden of serfdom compared to those living in lands further to the east. The rise of Sarmatism also led to repression against the Orthodox Church, to which the majority of Ukrainian population belonged. This resulted in the emergence of a social protest movement concentrated along Poland's border in the Carpathians, which involved peasants, sheep herders and, occasionally, demobilized soldiers. Forming into small groups, they attacked properties of the landlords, sometimes distributing the spoils among poor peasants.

Based in the border region between the Kingdom of Poland, Hungary and Moldavia, opryshky used the mountainous terrain as an advantage for their activities. During episodes of major upheaval, such as the Cossack–Polish War, opryshky would be joined by numerous peasants, forming insurgent bands. The peak of their activity took place in 1738–1759, when their raids expanded into the regions of Hutsulshchyna, Boykivshchyna, Bukovina and Transcarpathia. During that period legendary outlaw leader Oleksa Dovbush, as well as Vasyl Bayurak and Ivan Boychuk were active in those areas. In the late 18th and early 19th century, increasing taxes and forced conscription led to a new spike in the movement. A notable leader of opryshky in the Hutsul region during that time was Myron Shtoliuk.

The Opryshko movement was eventually defeated by Austrian military detachments sent into the areas of their activity, and became redundant after the abolition of serfdom in the Austrian Empire in the mid-19th century. However, in some locations opryshky remained to be active until the 20th century. In September 1935 a squad of Czechoslovak gendarmerie dispersed a gang of brigands headed Ilko Lypey and Yuriy Klevets, in the valley of Repynka river in Carpathian Ruthenia. Lypey, a fugitive who had been imprisoned for robbing travellers in 1926, was killed in the gunfight or committed suicide, meanwhile his comrade Klevets, a fellow fugitive, disappeared, possibly fleeing to Poland. The defeat of the "last opryshoks" caused a media sensation in Czechoslovak press of the time.

== Activities ==
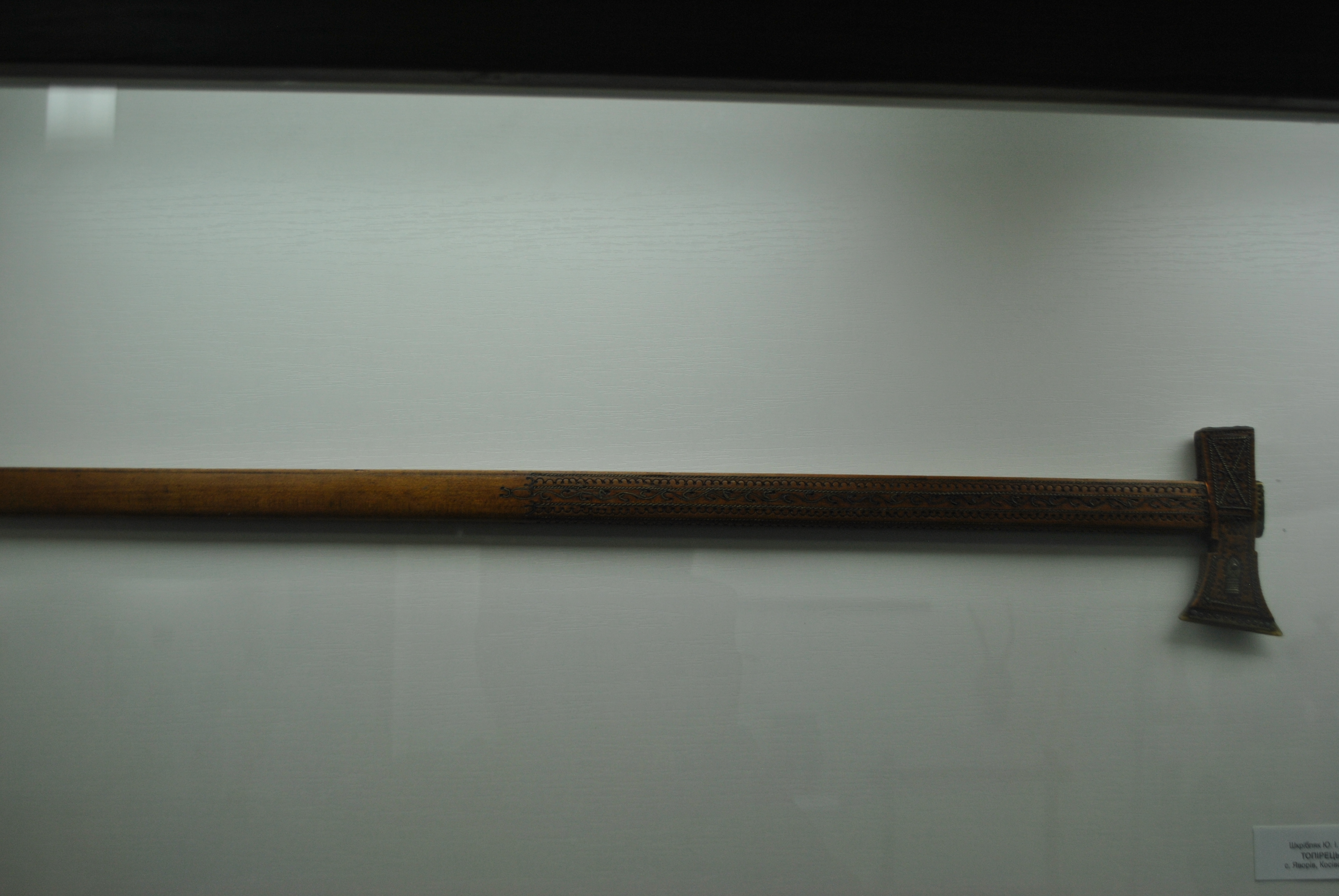
A traditional Hutsul shepherd's axe (topirets')

Contrary to their popular fame, opryshky's attacks were not exclusively aimed at lords, and rich peasants would also become their victims. Despite this, they enjoyed general sympathy of the peasant population, and contemporary sources present evidence, that many of the brigands would be sheltered, fed and cared for by ordinary villagers and townsfolk. The centre of opryshky activities was located in the region of Pokutia. Their bands would usually gather in spring, when trees became green and provided a hideout from persecution. To join the opryshky, a young man had to undergo a special initiation ritual, accompanied with swearing of an oath on a shepherd's axe, a traditional Hutsul battle weapon. This and other elements of archaic pagan culture were strongly present in the culture of opryshky, and the origin of some of their practices, such as finishing off members of own band who were wounded or fell sick while on march, remain unclear to this day.

== In folklore and literature ==
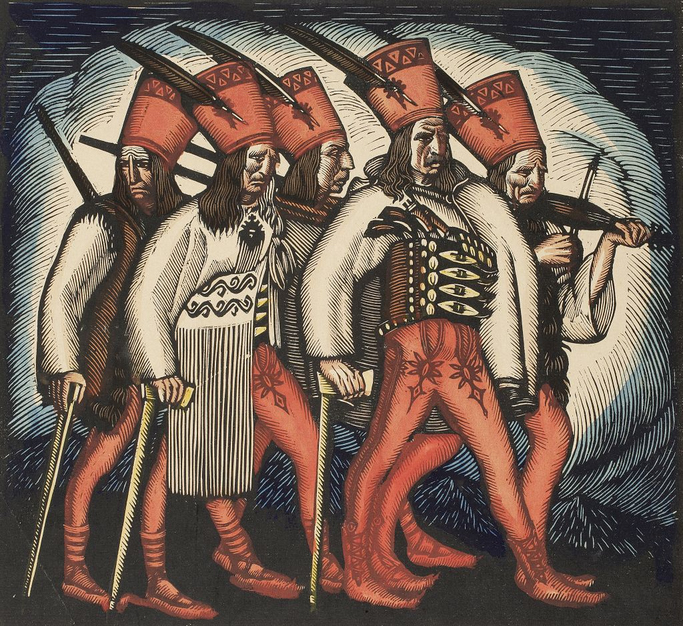
A romanticised depiction of zbójnik (Polish equivalent of opryshok) by Polish artist Władysław Skoczylas, 1916

Although opryshky in general had no religious or ideological motivation, their actions became a subject of praise in local folklore and literature. Folkloric materials dedicated to Opryshky were gathered and published by several ethnographers, including Volodymyr Hnatiuk, Yakiv Holovatsky and Volodymyr Shukhevych. Their image is also present in works of Ukrainian authors such as Yuriy Fedkovych, Ivan Franko, Hnat Khotkevych, Mykhailo Pavlyk, Markiian Shashkevych, Ivan Vahylevych etc. The topic of zbójnicy, the Polish equivalent of opryshky, attracted the attention of Polish authors Józef Korzeniowski (1797–1863) and Stanisław Vincenz, as well as Austrian Leopold von Sacher-Masoch and Czech Ivan Olbracht. In the Ukrainian Carpathians many geographic features bear the names of famous Opryshky, most prominently Oleksa Dovbush.

== See also ==
- Haydamaks - rebel outfits in Dnieper Ukraine during the 18th century
- Hajduks - brigands and paramilitaries active in the Balkans during the same era
- Arkan (dance) - traditional dance used as part of opryshky initiation rituals

== Sources ==
- Yaroslav Isayevych (1993). "Opryshoks". Encyclopedia of Ukraine.
- Paul Robert Magocsi (1996). A History of Ukraine. University of Toronto Press. ISBN 0802078206.
