= Oleksa Dovbush =

Ukrainian outlaw and folk hero

- Олекса Довбуш
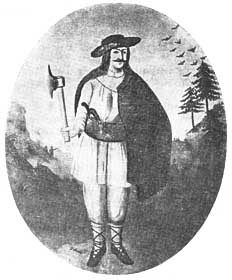
- Born: 1700; Pechenizhyn, Polish-Lithuanian Commonwealth
- Died: 24 August 1745 (aged 45-46); Stanisławów (modern day Ivano-Frankivsk)
- Occupation: Bandit

Oleksa Dovbush (Ukrainian: Олекса Довбуш, Polish: Aleksy Dobosz; 1700 – 24 August 1745) was a famous Ukrainian outlaw in the Polish–Lithuanian Commonwealth, leader of the opryshky movement, who became a folk hero.

== Biography ==
Oleksa was born in the Hutsul village of Pechenizhyn, Kolomyia Raion, in the Carpathian Mountains in the early 18th century in Polish–Lithuanian Commonwealth. He became the leader of his own band that consisted of almost 50 members (leheni). Popular tradition portrays him as a protector to the poor people of the region. There are few written references left of him and his activities.

Oleksa Dovbush and his brother Ivan started a robbery band in 1738. At first they were committing their robberies close to the place where they lived, this led to them being recognized quickly, which made them move their band to borders of Bukovina, and from there they went on to Moldavia. The brothers often fought, in 1739 the brothers fought against each other with weapons, during this fight Ivan hurt Oleksa's leg, after this they went in different directions. Oleksa together with his band continued their outlaw activities mainly in the vicinity of Pokuttia, robbing nobility of both Polish and Ruthenian origin, Jews, clergy houses, and rich peasants, as well as Armenian merchants. During their robberies Dovbush and his band would often torture their victims to get them to show all their prized possessions. During their robberies they committed a lot of murders, in October of 1739 Dovbush arrived in Tekucha where he killed a Jew called Łoszak and a Jewish woman, most probably his wife, after which he destroyed the books keeping the count of the money lent by the Jew. After the murder of the two Jews a Polish noble women, Teofila Jabłonowska, of whom the victims were subjects of, ordered an investigation of their deaths. During the summer of 1740, Dovbush together with his band attacked a caravan of Armenian merchants, the merchants tried to fight back, killing two people in Dovbush's band, however they were outnumbered, in the end all of the Armenians there were killed. The same day Dovbush attacked the village of Mykulyczyn, the villagers were not happy about this and decided to track down the band and confront them, the villagers confronted the robbers as they were laying down to sleep, killing one of the robbers in the process. The robbers were sometimes informed of smolaky (militias, composed mainly out of peasants and poor nobles, hunting the outlaws) coming by other peasants. During the summer, the poorest peasants often took work as shepherds in the mountain pastures, when the smolaky started pursuing the outlaws, these shepherds would alert them to the approaching units, however they were not entirely acting of their own volition, Fedir Paliichuk, asked about who provided the band with warnings about the advancing smolaky, gave the following testimony:

When we came to the sheep and beat and pressed the shepherds, then they told us.

In an especially brutal act Dovbush targeted his fellow Hutsul, who shared his Eastern Rite Christian faith, Didushko. Didushko was a prosperous landowner and served as the starosta of Długopole on the Bilyi Cheremosh. One day, Dovbush’s men requested that he provide some cheese. Didushko refused proudly and even offered a golden hat to anyone who could capture Dovbush. Offended by this, Oleksa soon appeared at the landowner’s estate. The bands assaulted his servants, and Didushko’s son Ivan was struck so hard on the head with an axe that he did not regain consciousness for an hour. The property was extensive, and finding Didushko proved difficult. The servants remained silent, resisting even physical punishment. He was respected in the village as a generous and fair man, so nobody wanted to betray him. Eventually, the avengers beat a maid who revealed that Didushko was on the pasture, shearing sheep. He was brought to his hut, where Dovbush was waiting. Semen Woloshchuk, a hired man, later recounted their final exchange: “Are you here, Master Didu? I sent you a knife so you could give me some cheese, and you said you would hand my head over to Stanisławów!” Dovbush struck Didushko in the chest with an axe, saying: “Do you recognize me, Oleksa? Here, take my head! You went around many villages telling people to try to hunt me down and promised them a golden hat for catching me.” A second blow felled Didushko, killing him. Still unsatisfied, Dovbush decapitated the Hutsul and took the head with him, then set fire to the hut containing the body. In 1744, Dovbush raided the estate of Colonel Zołotnicki, according to historian Antin Petrushevych in “General Galician-Ruthenian Chronicle from 1700 to the End of August 1772”, Dovbush set the colonel’s hands on fire, he also threw hot embers from the fire into his armpits, and then brutally murdered the colonel along with his wife, Zofia, and their son. Dovbush’s greatest achievement was the capture of Bohorodchany Castle. According to the inspection report of the ransacked Bohorodchany castle dated August 25, 1744, the events unfolded as follows:

Four men, including two soldiers, were hacked to death with axes on their heads, backs, and necks. The guard who raised the alarm was shot atop the bell tower. A shoemaker was shot in the chest, and a Jewish resident in the suburbs was slain with an axe. The castle’s keykeeper suffered multiple axe blows to the head and back and was beaten severely. A town servant was cut on the hands and back with axes.

The many folk songs and the few prose legends that still survive in Prykarpattia portray him as a local hero who robbed the rich and helped the poor serfs, like the legendary Robin Hood. His residence is believed to be located near the city of Bolekhiv in Ivano-Frankivsk Oblast. It is a rock complex that is called the Rocks of Dovbush which was nominated in the seven historical and seven natural wonders of Ukraine. Dovbush's deeds became so admired that the tales of his acts spread beyond the Hutsul region to the neighboring Pokuttia and Podillia regions of western Ukraine. His portraits were sold at local market places. He was feared by Polish szlachta. Once, a military expedition of 2,000 soldiers, headed by Polish magnate Józef Potocki, was sent to stop his activities. Nonetheless, he could not be captured. Dovbush was shot and mortally wounded by one Stepan Dzvinchuk, a Hutsul peasant, the husband of his lover Dzvinka, in 1745. Dovbush, still showing signs of life, was taken to Stanisławów (modern day Ivano-Frankivsk) and exhibited publicly, the townspeople and many visitors from the surrounding areas, drawn by the announcement of the spectacle, watched and cheered.

Dzvinchuk was interrogated by the city court in Stanisławów, after which the Voivoda awarded Dzvinchuk, for freeing the people of the Voivodship from Dovbush, by exempting him from taxes and any state expenses for the rest of his life.

According to Hassidic legend, Dovbush at one time hid in the house of Baal Shem Tov and gave him his pipe as a token of friendship.

== Legacy ==
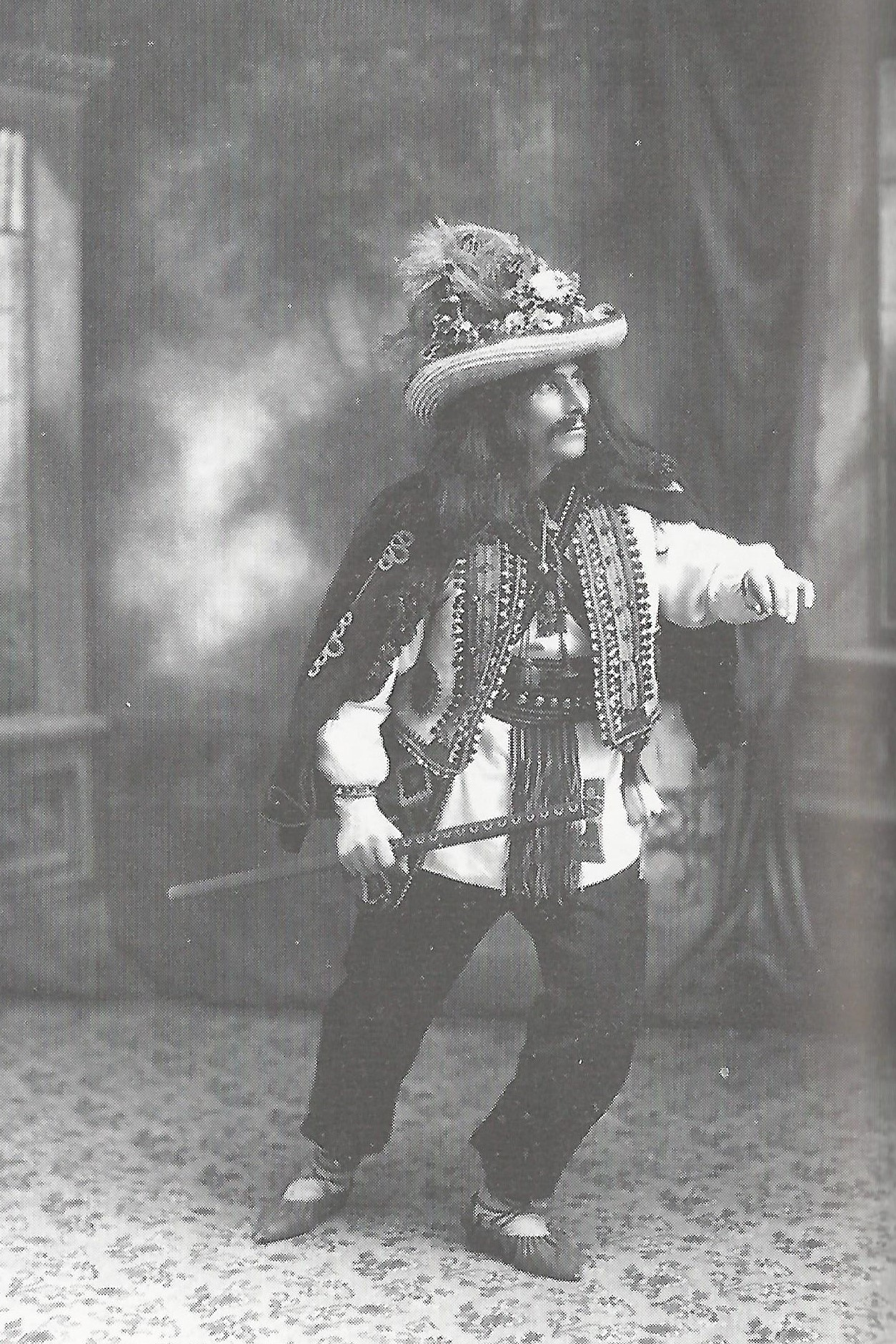
Vasyl Avramenko doing "Dovbush" dance

After his death, his legacy was extended by several of his companions and/or people that idolized him: Vasyl Bayurak (a memorial plate is erected in Ivano-Frankivsk that mentions of his execution), Maksym Zalizniak, Ustym Karmaliuk, and many others.

His legend entered Ukrainian folklore and was the subject of various artistic works, by, among others, the writers Ivan Franko and Yuriy Fedkovych. Ukrainian choreographer Vasyl Avramenko created a dance called "Dovbush". An epic film dedicated to Dovbush was released by Ukrainian director Oles Sanin in 2023. One of the brigades of the Armed Forces of Ukraine bears the name of Dovbush.

== See also ==
- Hutsuls
- Carpatho-Rusyns
- Peasant uprising
- Ukrainian folklore
- Juraj Janosik
- Ustym Karmaliuk
