= Alexey Yaroshevsky =

Russian correspondent

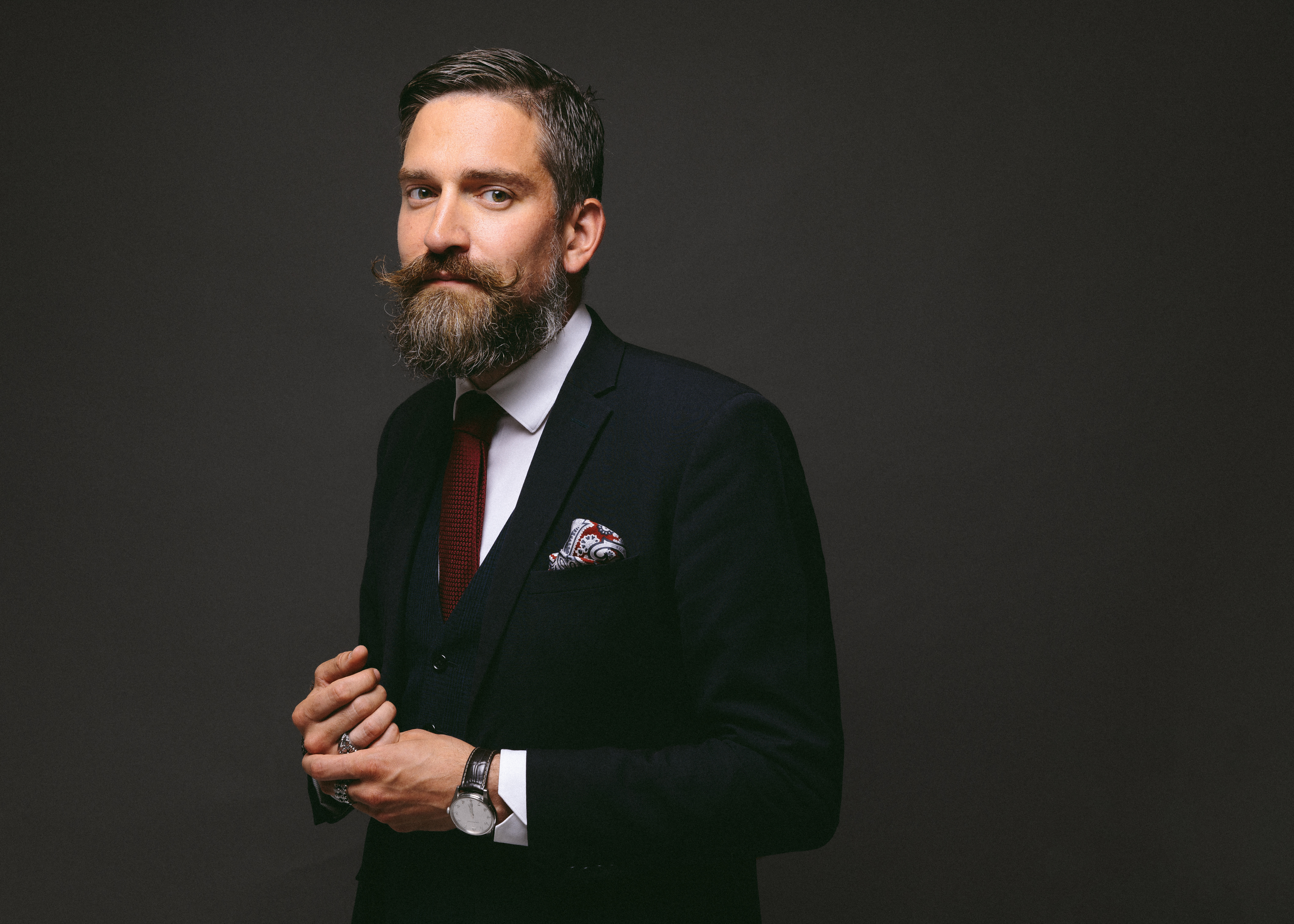
- Born: 13 June 1984 (age 42); Moscow, Russian SFSR, Soviet Union
- Citizenship: Russian Federation
- Education: Moscow State Linguistic University
- Occupation: Journalism

Alexey Yaroshevsky (Russian: Алексей Ярошевский; born 13 June 1984) is a Russian reporter, television host and commentator. Worked on RT network since 2005 until 2022, now he is the English voice commentator of the Russian Premier League, and also a former host at the Okko Sport Channel in Russia.

== Career ==
Alexei's father had over 45 years of experience as a journalist, as did his uncle and grandfather (who worked in the Soviet television for almost 50 years). In his childhood Alexey wanted to be a lawyer, but eventually, when he had to choose a university, he decided to enter the Moscow State Linguistic University. He thought that learning languages was always useful and with knowledge of languages he could specialize in various fields. In the second year of studying he was sent for an internship and his parents offered him an internship on the REN TV television network, where they worked at the time, in the international department. Alexey worked for REN TV as a web editor and then news reporter from 2002 to 2005.

Yaroshevsky joined RT in 2005.

In 2007 he made a documentary about North Korea. In 2009–2012, Yaroshevsky served as the head of RT's bureau in Eastern Europe, based in Kyiv, Ukraine. He was nearly killed during a report of the Maiden Revolution. He was then sent to be RT's new reporter in New York City before moving to Washington, D.C. In 2015 and focused on reporting investigations for RT America in the areas of environmental hazards and key geopolitical stories.

Having returned to Moscow in 2017, Alexey started working solely on sports coverage - including the 2018 FIFA World Cup in Russia and Euro-2020. In 2020, Alexey became the first English-speaking commentator of the Russian Premier League. Same year, he launched "Спик Изи" project aimed at helping Russian-speaking people to master different accents and dialects of English. Alexey can freely speak English (in 30+ dialects), Russian, Chinese and Ukrainian.
