= Ludmila Anatolievna Yaroshevskaya =

Soviet composer, pianist, and concertmistress (1906–1975)

Ludmila Anatolievna Yaroshevskaya (14 September 1906 – 27 March 1975) was a Soviet composer, pianist, and concertmistress. A native of Kiev, she studied piano with V. Pukhalsky at the Lysenko Music School there, graduating in 1930. She was concertmistress at the Lviv Music School from 1923 to 1926. She died in Lviv in 1975.

Her compositions include:

== Chamber ==
- Capriccio (cello and piano; 1954)
- Exprompt (violin and piano; 1946)
- Scherzo (violin and piano; 1935)
- Sonata (clarinet and piano; 1954)

== Orchestra ==
- Cello Concerto (1940)
- Heroic Overture (1946)
- Suite on Volga Themes
- Violin Concerto (1954)
- Year 1654 Overture (1954)

== Piano ==
- Fantasy on Hutsul Themes
