= Ukrainian dialects =

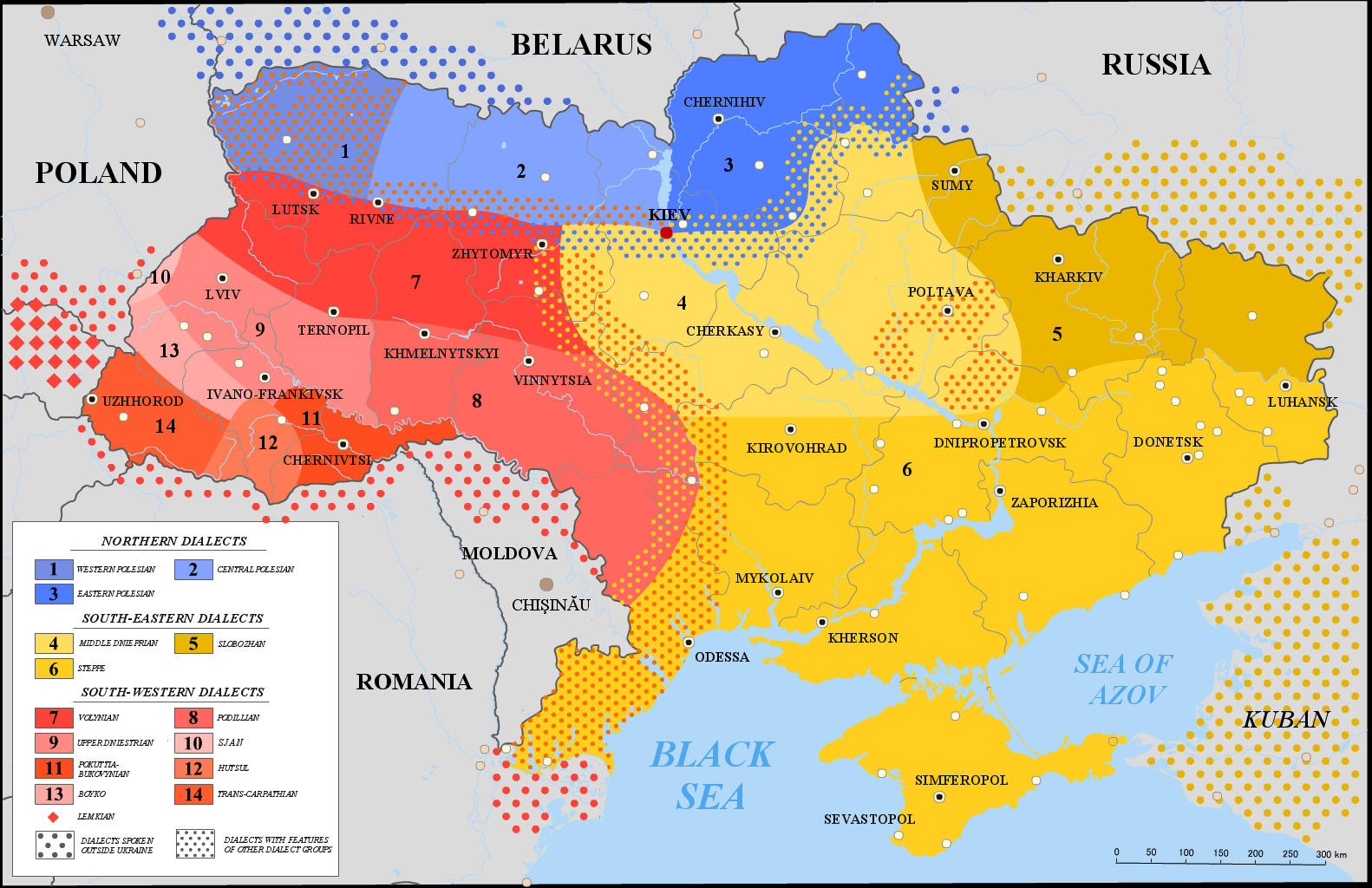
Map of Ukrainian dialects and subdialects (2005) Northern group Southeastern group Southwestern group

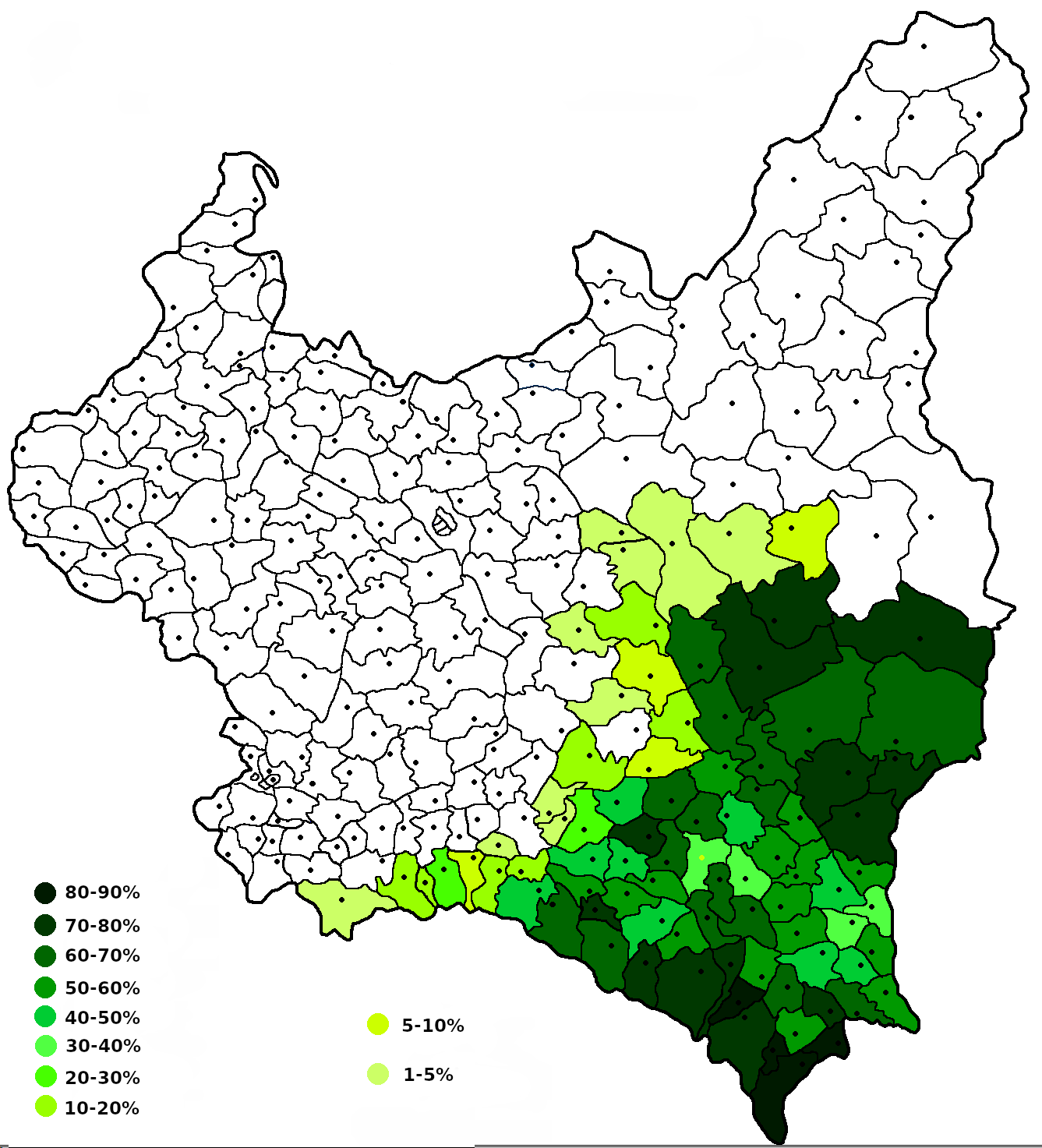
The Ukrainian (Ruthenian) language in the Second Polish Republic according to the 1921 census

Geographic distribution of the Ukrainian language in the Russian Empire according to the 1897 census

In the Ukrainian language there are three major dialectal groups according to territory: the southwestern group (Ukrainian: південно-західне наріччя, romanized: pivdenno-zakhidne narichchia), the southeastern group (Ukrainian: південно-східне наріччя, romanized: pivdenno-skhidne narichchia) and the northern group (Ukrainian: північне наріччя, romanized: pivnichne narichchia) of dialects.

== List of dialects ==
=== Southwestern group ===
Southwestern dialects
Name	Description
Volhynian-Podilian dialects
Podillian	Spoken on the territory of Podolia, in the southern parts of the Vinnytsia and Khmelnytskyi oblasts, in the northern part of the Odesa Oblast, and in the adjacent districts of the Cherkasy Oblast, the Kirovohrad Oblast and the Mykolaiv Oblast.
Volhynian	Spoken in Rivne and Volyn oblasts, as well as in parts of Zhytomyr, Khmelnytskyi and Ternopil. It was also historically spoken in Chełm Land (Ukrainian: Холмщина, romanized: Kholmshchyna) in Poland.
Galician–Bukovinian dialects
Dniestrian	Considered to be the main Galician dialect, spoken in the Lviv, Ternopil and Ivano-Frankivsk oblasts. Its distinguishing characteristics are the influence of Polish and the German vocabulary, which is reminiscent of the Austro-Hungarian rule.
Pokuttia–Bukovina	Spoken in the Chernivtsi Oblast of Ukraine. This dialect has some distinct vocabulary borrowed from Romanian.
Hutsul (Eastern Carpathian)	Spoken by the Hutsul people on the northern slopes of the Carpathian Mountains, in the extreme southern parts of the Ivano-Frankivsk Oblast, as well as in parts of the Chernivtsi and Zakarpattia oblasts.
Upper Sannian	Spoken in the border area between Ukraine and Poland in the San river valley. Often confused with Lemko or Lyshak.
Carpathian dialects
Boyko	Spoken by the Boyko people on the northern side of the Carpathian Mountains in the Lviv and Ivano-Frankivsk oblasts. It can also be heard across the border in the Subcarpathian Voivodeship of Poland.
Lemko	Spoken by the Lemko people, most of whose homeland rests outside the current political borders of Ukraine in the Prešov Region of Slovakia along the southern side of the Carpathian Mountains, and in the southeast of modern Poland, along the northern sides of the Carpathians.
Transcarpathian	Spoken in Zakarpattia Oblast. It is similar to the Lemko dialect but differs from it due to the historical influence and integration of Slovak and Hungarian elements.

=== Southeastern group ===
Southeastern dialects
Name	Description
Middle Dnieprian	The basis of standard literary Ukrainian. It is spoken in the central part of Ukraine, including the southern and eastern part of Kyiv Oblast). The dialects spoken in Cherkasy, Poltava and Kyiv regions are considered to be the closest to standard Ukrainian.
Slobozhan	Spoken in Kharkiv, Sumy, Luhansk, northern part of Donetsk regions of Ukraine, as well as in the Voronezh and Belgorod regions of Russia. This dialect is formed from a gradual mixture of Russian and Ukrainian, with progressively more Russian in the northern and eastern parts of the region. Thus, there is no linguistic border between Russian and Ukrainian and both grammar sets can be applied. This dialect is considered a transitional dialect between Ukrainian and Russian.
Steppe	Spoken in southern and southeastern Ukraine. This dialect was originally the main language of Zaporozhian Cossacks.

=== Northern group ===
Northern (Polisian) dialects
Name	Description
Eastern Polesian dialect	Spoken in Chernihiv (excluding the southeastern districts), in the northern part of Sumy and in the northeastern part of Kyiv Oblast, in the adjacent areas of Russia, which include the southwestern part of Bryansk Oblast (the area around Starodub), as well as in some areas in Kursk, Voronezh and Belgorod oblasts. No linguistic border can be defined. The vocabulary approaches Russian as the language approaches the Russian Federation. Both Ukrainian and Russian grammar sets can be applied to this dialect. Thus, this dialect can be considered a transitional dialect between Ukrainian and Russian.
Central Polesian dialect	Spoken in northwestern part of Kyiv Oblast, in northern part of Zhytomyr and in northeastern part of Rivne Oblast.
Western Polesian	Spoken in northern part of Volyn Oblast, northwestern part of Rivne Oblast, as well as in the adjacent districts of Brest Region in Belarus. The dialect spoken in Belarus uses Belarusian grammar, and thus is considered by some to be a dialect of Belarusian. West Polissian dialects include Podlachian subdialects spoken in Podlachia in Poland. They are also known as Siedlce dialects (after Siedlce Governorate, where the subdialects were mostly studied), and Khakhlatska mova (Ukrainian: хахлацька мова, "khokhols' language").

== Emigre dialects ==
Ukrainian is also spoken by a large émigré population, particularly in Canada (Canadian Ukrainian), The United States, Brazil, Argentina, and Australia. The founders of this population primarily emigrated from Galicia, which used to be part of Austro-Hungary before World War I, and belonged to Poland between the World Wars. The language spoken by most of them is based on the Galician dialect of Ukrainian from the first half of the twentieth century. Compared with modern Ukrainian, the vocabulary of Ukrainians outside Ukraine reflects less influence of Russian, yet may contain Polish or German loanwords. It often contains many loanwords from the local language as well (e.g. снікерси, snikersy, for "sneakers" in the United States).

== Disputed status of some dialects ==
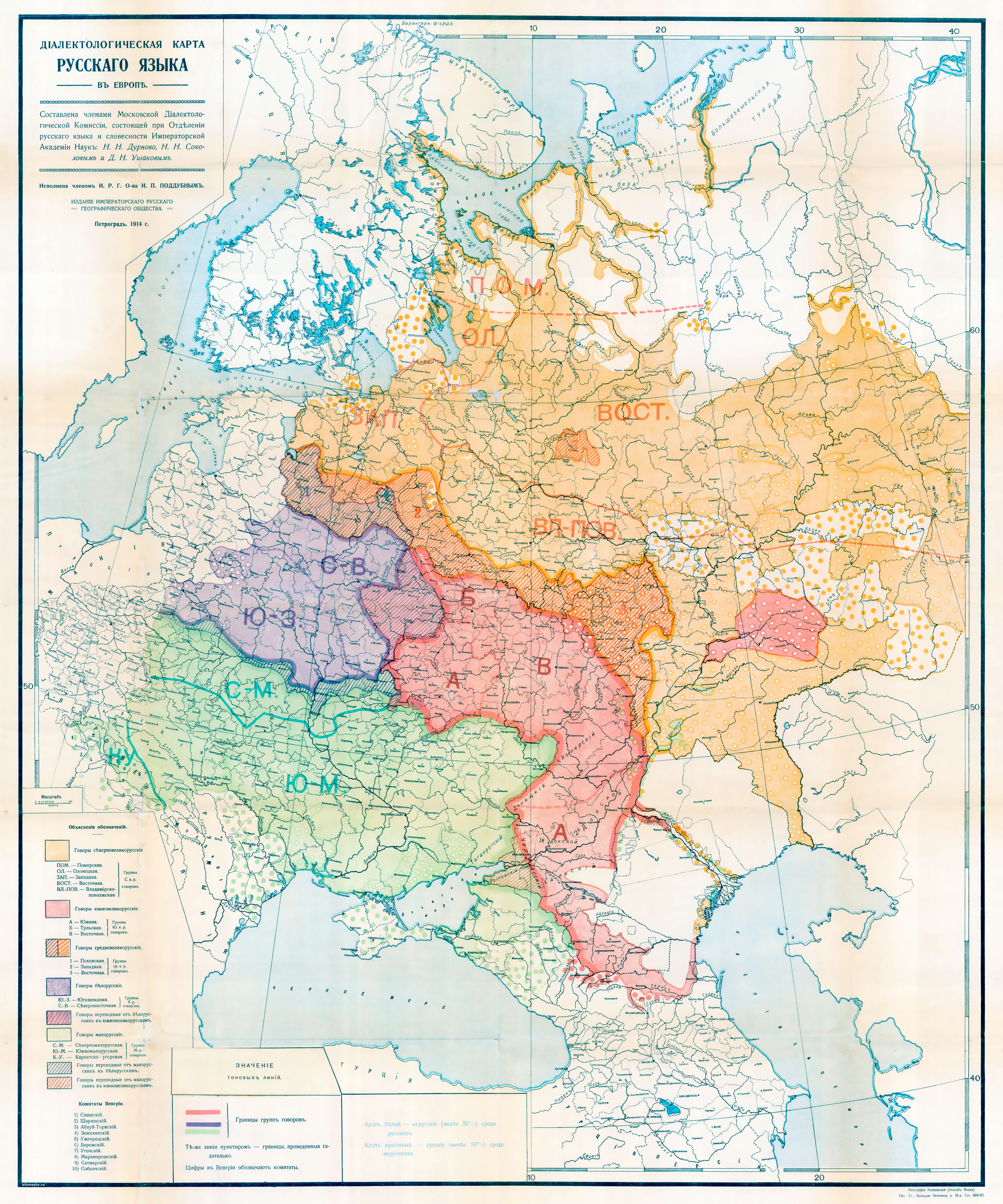
Russian "dialectological map" of 1914. Territory inhabited by Ukrainian-speakers in the Russian and Austro-Hungarian empires is shaded in green. The language was called Ruthenian in Austria-Hungary and "Little Russian" or "Malorussian dialect" in the Russian Empire.

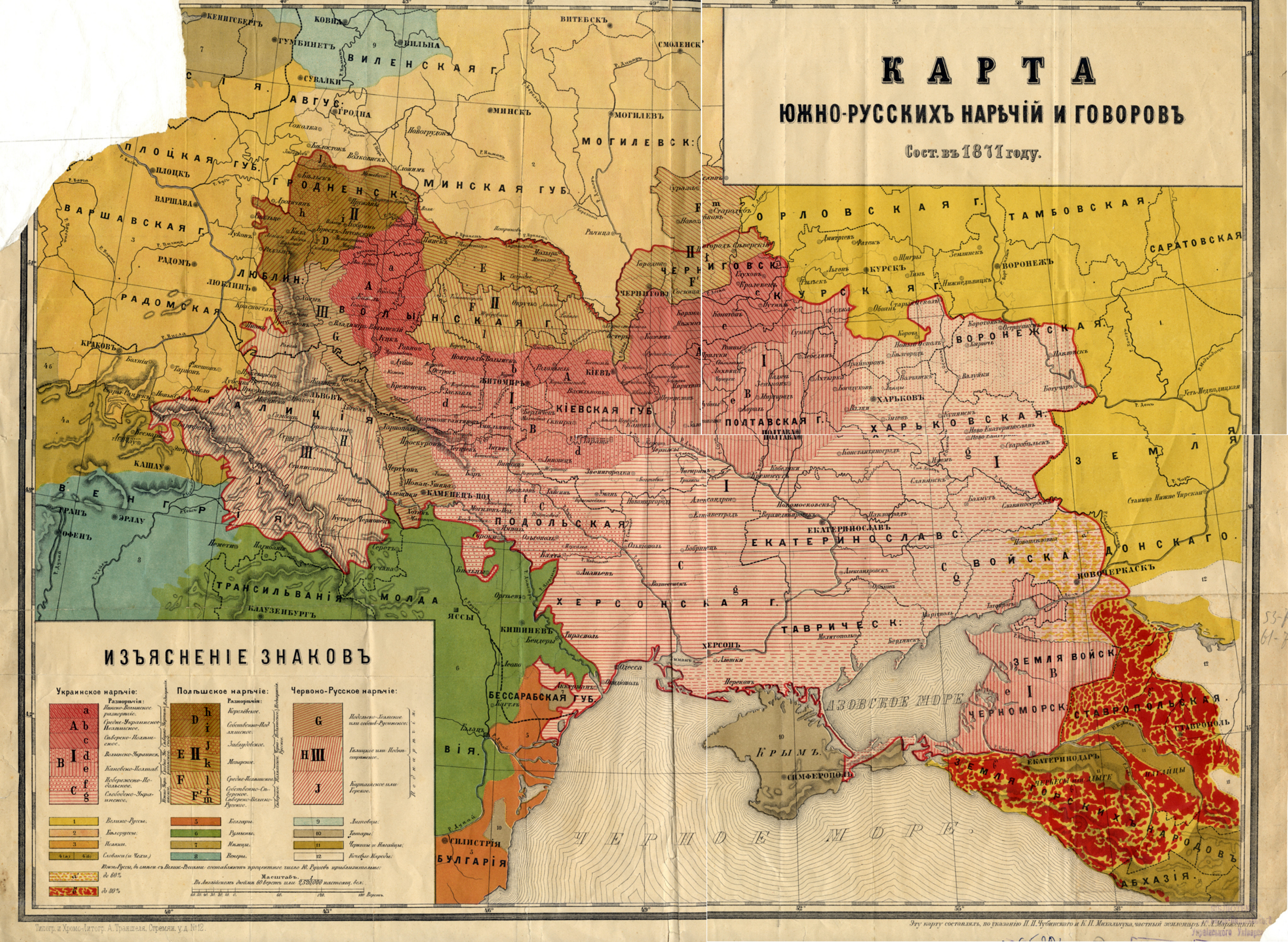
"Map of South-Russian accents and dialects" (1871). In the 19th and early 20th centuries, the Ukrainian language was categorized by Russian academics as a derivative of Russian language referred to as "South-Russian" or "Little-Russian".

=== Balachka ===
Balachka is spoken in the Kuban region of Russia, by the Kuban Cossacks. The Kuban Cossacks being descendants of the Zaporozhian Cossacks are beginning to consider themselves as a separate ethnic identity. Their dialect is based on Middle Dnieprian with the Ukrainian grammar. It includes dialectal words of central Ukrainian with frequent inclusion of Russian vocabulary, in particular for modern concepts and items. It varies somewhat from one area to another.

=== Rusyn ===
The Rusyn language is classified as a dialect of Ukrainian by the Ukrainian government. However Rusyn is considered by some linguists to be a separate language.

- Dolinian Rusyn or Subcarpathian Rusyn is spoken in the Zakarpattia Oblast.
- Pannonian or Bačka Rusyn is spoken in northwestern Serbia and eastern Croatia. Rusin language of the Bačka dialect has been recognised as one of the official languages of the Serbian Autonomous Province of Vojvodina).
- Priashiv Rusyn is the Ukrainian dialect spoken in the Prešov (Ukrainian: Пряшів, romanized: Priashiv) region of Slovakia, as well as by some émigré communities, primarily in the United States of America.

== See also ==
- Balachka
- Boyko
- Poleshuk
- Rusyn language
- Ruthenian (disambiguation)
- Surzhyk
