= Pokuttia–Bukovina dialect =

Dialect of Ukrainian

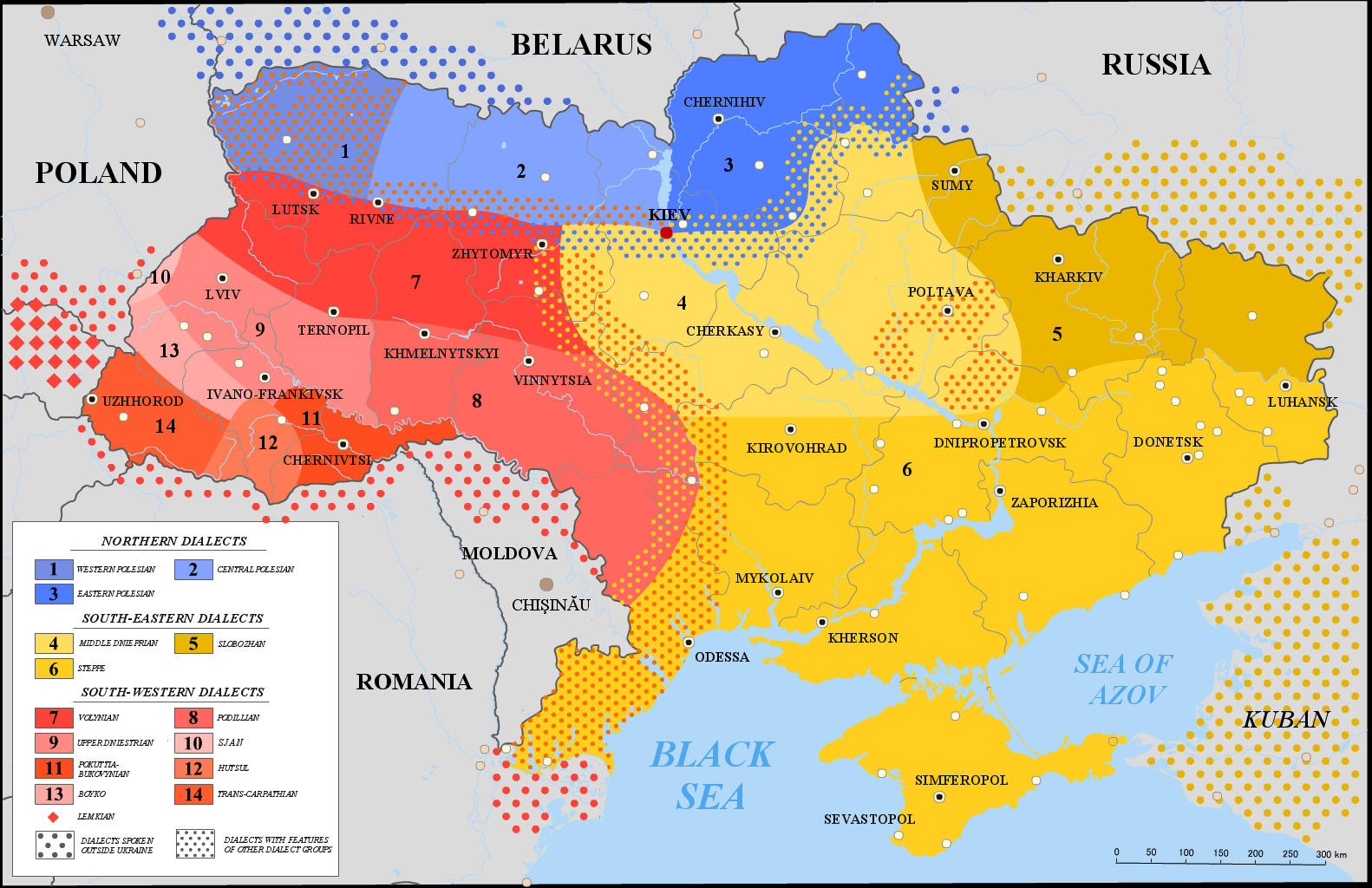
Map of the dialects and subdialects of the Ukrainian language. Pokuttia-Bukovyna dialect is marked with no. 11

The Pokuttia–Bukovina dialect (Ukrainian: Покутсько-буковинський говір, romanized: Pokutsko-bukovynskyi hovir) is a dialect of the Ukrainian language that originated in Pokuttia and Bukovina under the influence of the Romanian language. Along with Hutsul, Upper Prutian and Upper Sannian dialects, it is part of the archaic Galician-Bukovinian group of dialects. The dialect is locally spoken in areas of Western Ukraine south of the Dniester and east of the Carpathian Mountains, which includes parts of Chernivtsi Oblast, excluding its extreme western regions, and the eastern part of Ivano-Frankivsk Oblast. The dialectal area is centered around Kolomyia and Chernivtsi.

== History ==
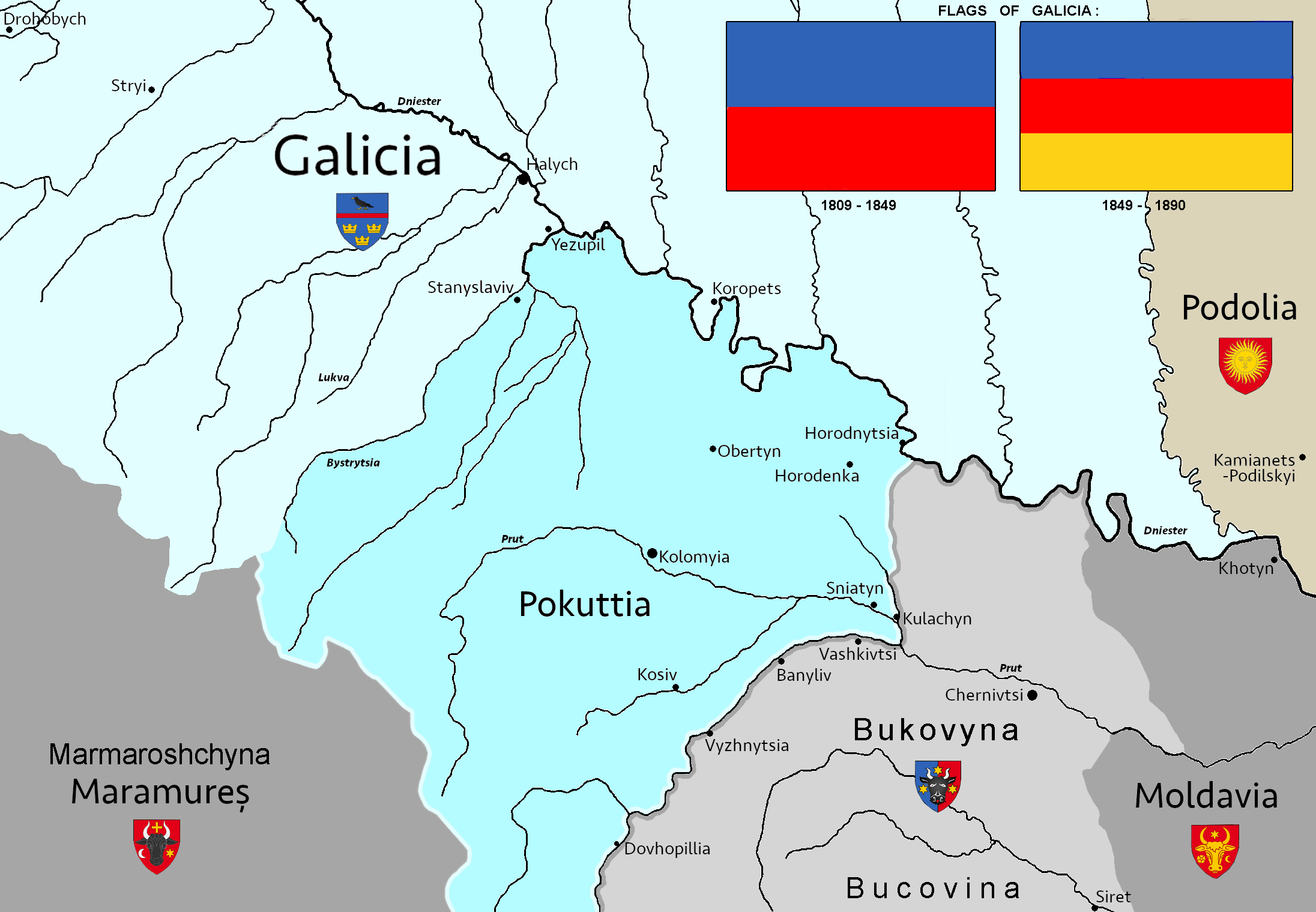
Map of the historical region Pokuttia (darker blue), based on Ion Nistor, Die moldauischen Ansprüche auf Pokutien, Vienna 1910

The territory of Pokuttia had been part of Moldavia since the 14th century. The Moldavian state had appeared by the mid-14th century, eventually expanding its territory all the way to the Black Sea. Bukovina and neighboring regions were the nucleus of the Moldavian Principality, with the city of Iași (outside but near Bukovina) as its capital from 1564 (after Baia, Siret and Suceava, all in Bukovina). When Moldavia established its control over part of Pokuttia and Bukovina, there occurred a process of Romanianization. The language of the Moldavians influenced the language spoken by locals, and the Pokuttia–Bukovina dialect was formed. It is distinct from other Ukrainian dialects because all of them are influenced by other Slavic languages, while the Pokuttia–Bukovina dialect was formed under the influence of Romance languages. The dialect preserved several archaic endings and soft declension, and certain lexical peculiarities, including Romanianisms. The expansion of ancient Pokuttian phonetic features in the 14th-16th centuries in western Podolia contributed to the formation of a broader group of Dniester dialects.

== Area of dialect's distribution ==
The area of the Pokuttian-Bukovinian dialect covers the regions of western Ukraine located in the lower and middle reaches of the Dniester River (on the right bank of the Dniester east of the Carpathian Mountains). This area covers the eastern districts of the Ivano-Frankivsk region and almost entirely the territory of the Chernivtsi region, excluding its extreme western areas, generally coinciding with the historical and ethnographic regions of Pokuttia and Northern Bukovina. The dialect can also be found in small areas of Romania in the border areas with Ukraine (in the northern part of the Suceava County) and along the territory of Moldova.

== Linguistics ==
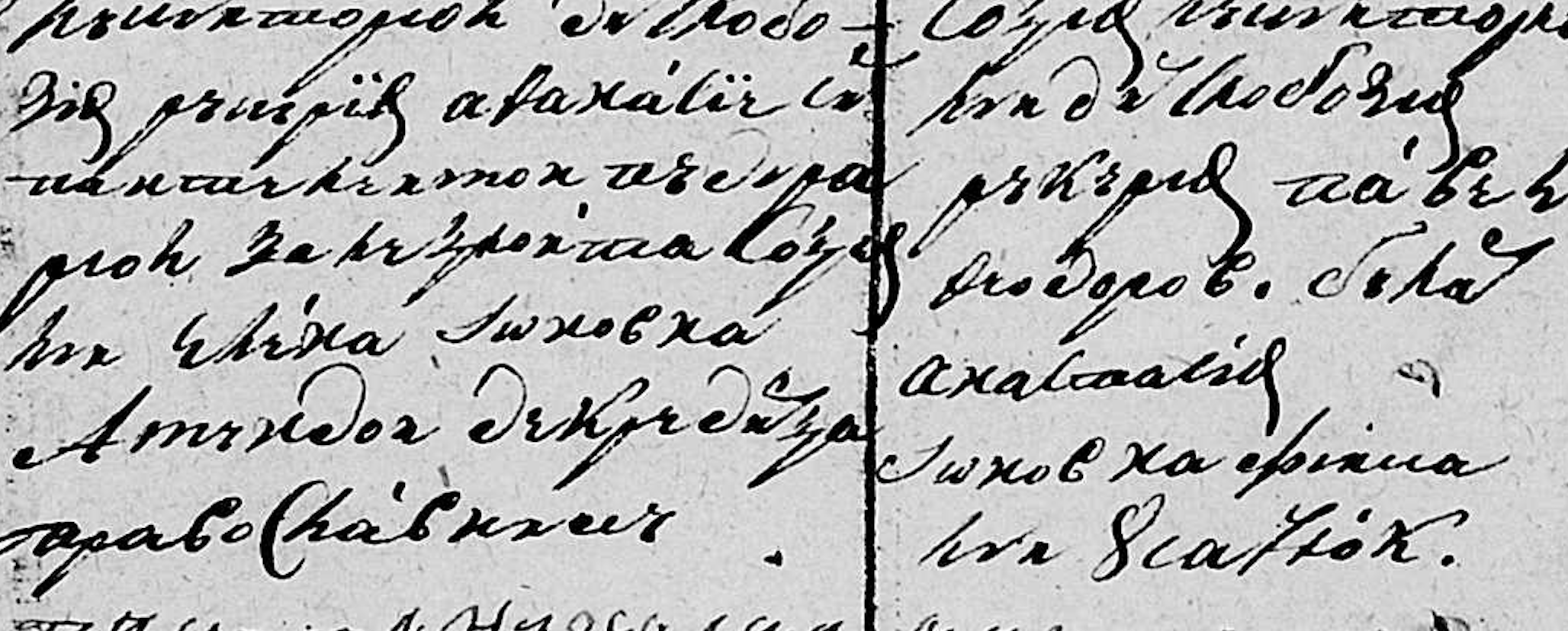
Extract from a church register in a Pokuttia–Bukovina dialect variant from Răcăria, the Republic of Moldova (18th century)

The study of the Pokuttia–Bukovina dialect was carried out by such researchers of Ukrainian dialects as I. G. Verhratsky, Y. .A. Karpenko, K. Kisilevsky, B. V. Kobylyansky, K. Lukyanyuk, V. A Prokopenko and others.

== Main features ==
=== Phonetics ===
- Pokuttia-Bukovynian dialect is characterized by the transition of [a] following palatalized consonants into [e], [ɪ], [i], both in stressed and unstressed positions: душє, шєпка/шьипка, порьидок, спідниці, челідь, in some varieties also їйце, єк, поєс (standard Ukrainian pronunciation - душа, шапка, порядок, спідниця, челядь, яйце, як, пояс).
- Another feature is the presence of alveolar [l], especially in varieties neighbouring to the areas of Hutsul and Boyko dialects.
- Word-final [s], [t͡s] are depalatalized: дес, хтос, хлопец, отец, вулица, копицу, польский (standard Ukrainian - десь, хтось, хлопець, отець, вулиця, копицю, польський).
- Palatalization of [ʃ], [ʒ], [t͡ʃ] and [r] is also widespread.
- Consonants are usually devoiced in word-final positions and before other unvoiced consonants.
- Palatalized [t] and d are systematically transformed into [kʲ]/[c] and [ɡʲ]/[ɟ].

=== Morphology ===
- Like in the neighbouring Dniestrian dialect, many feminine single nouns in instrumental case the ending -еў and in dative/locative - и (вулицеў [ˈwulet͡seu̯], соли [ˈsɔle], по земли compared to standard Ukrainian вулицею [ˈwulet͡sejʊ], солі [ˈsɔlʲi], по землі).
- Dual is preserved in some forms (дві єйці, дві хаті). No adjectives of the "soft group" are present: синий, горішний (standard Ukrainian - синій, горішній).
- Comparative adjectives are formed with the addition of suffixes -ішч-, -ішʼ-, -ч- (даўнішчий, менче) or by adding the particle май (май більший, май раненько).
- Prefix ві- is also actively used: віпити, віганєли (standard Ukrainian випити, виганяли).
- Infinitive forms with -чи are also widespread: печи, стричі (Standard Ukrainian - пекти, стригти).
- In Bukovynian group of subdialects verb forms ходю, носю, возю are common (literary Ukrainian - ходжу, ношу, вожу).
- In 3rd person of some verbs the final [t] may be eliminated: ходе, баче, вони робле, їди (standard Ukrainian ходить, бачить, вони роблять, їдять).
- Complex future forms of verbs can be used in two variants: будемо робити - мемо робити.
- Complex past forms are also present: ходиўїм/ходиўєм, ходиўїс/ходиўєс, ходилисмо.
- Personal pronouns take enclitic forms: ми, ти, си, му, мі, кі, го, ї.
- Reflexive particle -ся can be used both before and after the word and has several varieties: ся, са, си.
- A characteristic adverb used in the dialect is бавно [ˈbau̯no] - "slowly".
- Emphatic particles -ко and ади are used with some verbs (ходи-ко, ади я маю).

=== Lexical features ===
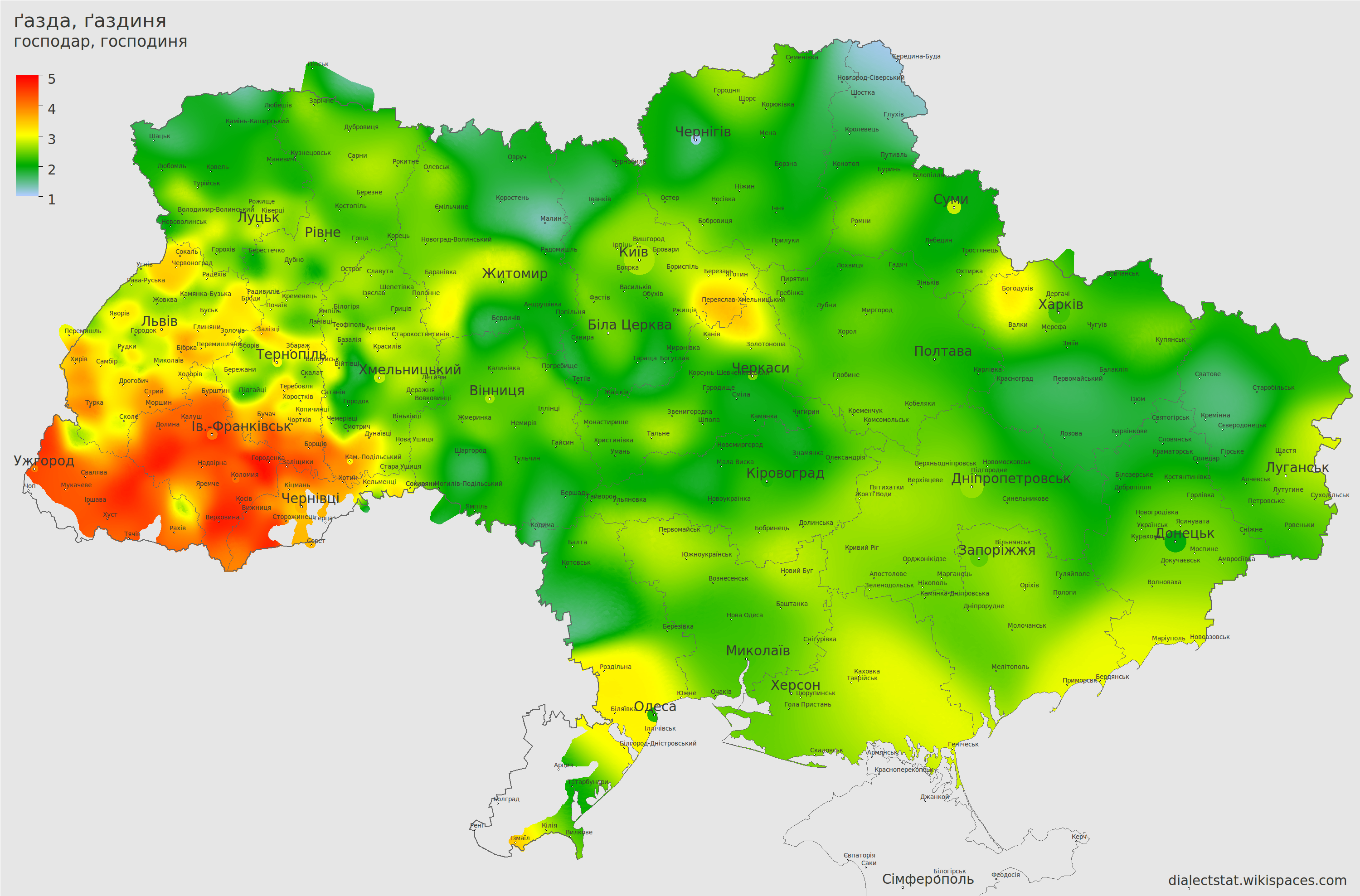
Usage of the words ґазда, ґаздиня in Ukraine

Potatoes in Bukovinian dialects

The vocabulary of the Pokuttian-Bukovinian dialect area is characterized by such words as:

- ґазда [ˈɡazdɐ], газдині [ɡɐzˈdɪnʲe] ("host"/"master", "hostess"/"mistress")
- жинтиці (zhyntytsi, standard Ukrainian сироватка, syrovatka - "serum")
- кугут (kuhut, literary Ukrainian півень, piven' - "rooster")
- лилик (lylyk, literary Ukrainian кажан, kazhan - "bat")
- шутий (shutyy, literary Ukrainian безрогий, bezrohyy - "hornless")
- рішча (rishcha, standard Ukrainian хмиз, khmyz - "brushwood") etc.

With Hutsul dialects, Pokuttian-Bukovinian shares the following words:

- барабулі (barabuli - "potato")
- веремнє (véremnye - "weather") and many others
- with Dniestrian: ґуц (guts - "knot")
- довбач (dovbach - "woodpecker")
- товар (tovar - "cattle")
- etc. Some local words characteristic of the region are вевирица (vévyrytsa - "squirrel")
- ковтач (kovtach - "woodpecker"
- половик (polovýk - "hawk"). Among numerous Romanian loanwords present in the Pokuttian-Bukovynian dialect are:
- дзестри (dzestry, from Romanian zestre - "dowry")
- клака (klaka - "collective work")
- матуша (matusha - "aunt", "older woman")
- ліліяк (liliyak - "lilac).

== See also ==
- Ukrainians of Romania
- Ukrainian dialects
