= Southwestern Ukrainian dialects =

Group of dialects spoken in Southwestern Ukraine

- Південно-західне наріччя
- Region: Western and Central Ukraine
- Language family: Indo-European: Slavic; East Slavic; Ukrainian; Southwestern Ukrainian dialects

Language codes
- ISO 639-3: –
- Glottolog: sout2604
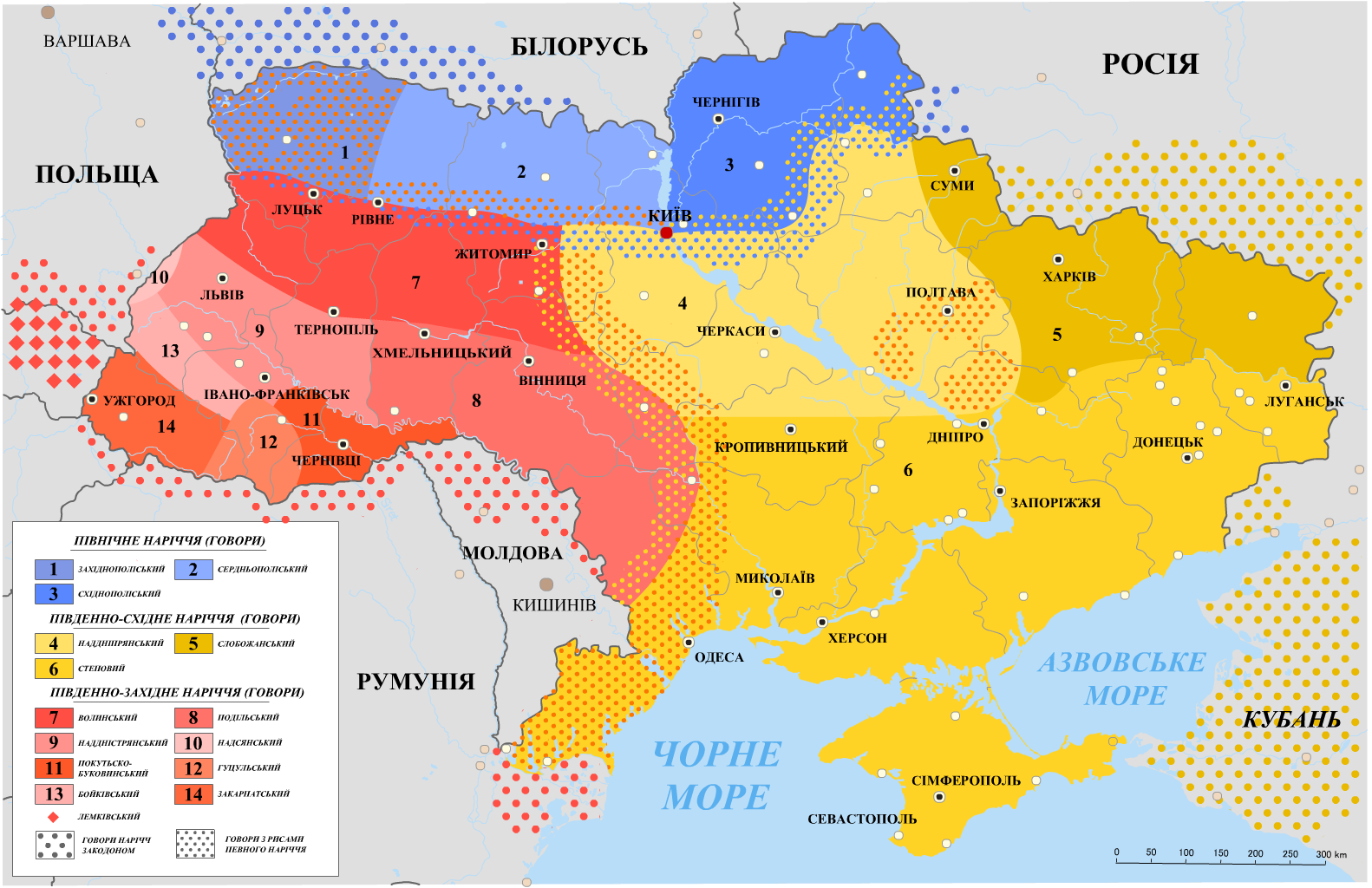
- Modern Ukrainian dialects. Southwestern Ukrainian is shown in red. Volhynian-Podolian group: Volhynian (7) Podolian (8) Galician–Bukovinian group: Dniestrian (9) Upper Sannian (10) Pokuttia–Bukovina (11) Hutsul (12) Carpathian group: Boyko (13) Transcarpathian (14) Lemko (in rhombuses)

The Southwestern Ukrainian dialects (Ukrainian: Південно-західне наріччя, romanized: Pivdenno-zakhidne narichchia) are, together with the Northern and Southeastern groups, one of the three main dialect groups of the Ukrainian language. In contrast to Southeastern, which is the literary standard of Ukrainian within Ukraine, Southwestern is common within the Ukrainian diaspora, much of which comes from Western Ukraine.

== Geography ==
Southwestern dialects are separated from dialects transitional to Northern Ukrainian along the line Hrubieszów-Volodymyr-Lutsk-Zdolbuniv-Zhytomyr-Bila Tserkva. The separating line between Southwestern and Southeastern Ukrainian dialects runs (north to south) from the western outskirts of Bila Tserkva through Uman and Ananiiv and up to the Dniester.

== Main features ==
=== Phonology ===
The Southwestern dialects contain more archaisms than the Southeastern dialects, but do not use the same archaic vowel system as the Northern dialects. Among the speakers of the Carpathian dialect group, regardless of stress, historic vowel sounds ō and ē become і, ě becomes 'і, and ę becomes 'а. In the Galician–Bukovinian dialect group, ě becomes 'е or 'y, and ę becomes 'і.

Southwestern dialects differ from Southeastern dialects by the presence of palatalized consonants in compounds ки, хи, ги (лавкі, лавкє; шляхі, шляхє); lack of distinction between palatalized and unpalatalized [r] (цар - царйа); lack of lengthened consonants in some varieties; stronger palatalization of dental consonants, especially [s], [z], [t͡s]; presence of consonant devoicing before unvoiced consonants and in word-final position (грип, діт); replacement of compound вй with вл (деревльаний, здоровльа); unpalatalized [s] in compound -ськ(ий): панский.

Historically, the Southwestern dialects also separated foreign loanwords from native Ukrainian words by usage of the /ɡ/ sound for "г" rather than the /ɦ/ typically used for the sound in non-loanwords. This practice ended following the Ukrainian orthography of 1933 and the Soviet annexation of Eastern Galicia and Volhynia. There are also differences in stress in many words between Southwestern and Southeastern dialects.

=== Morphology ===
Unlike in Southeastern dialects, dative singular masculine ending -ови (синови, братови) is typical for Southwestern dialects along with locative sg. masc.-и in words such as (на) кони, земли, тіни, поли. Genitive plural is formed with -ий (людий, очий, гостий). Verb forms usually end with unpalatalized [t]: кричит, кричат, кричіт; infinitives - with -ти, -чи (брати, казати, беречи). Particle ся in Southwestern dialects can be also used before the verb: я ся мию, ти ся мене боїш.

== Classification ==
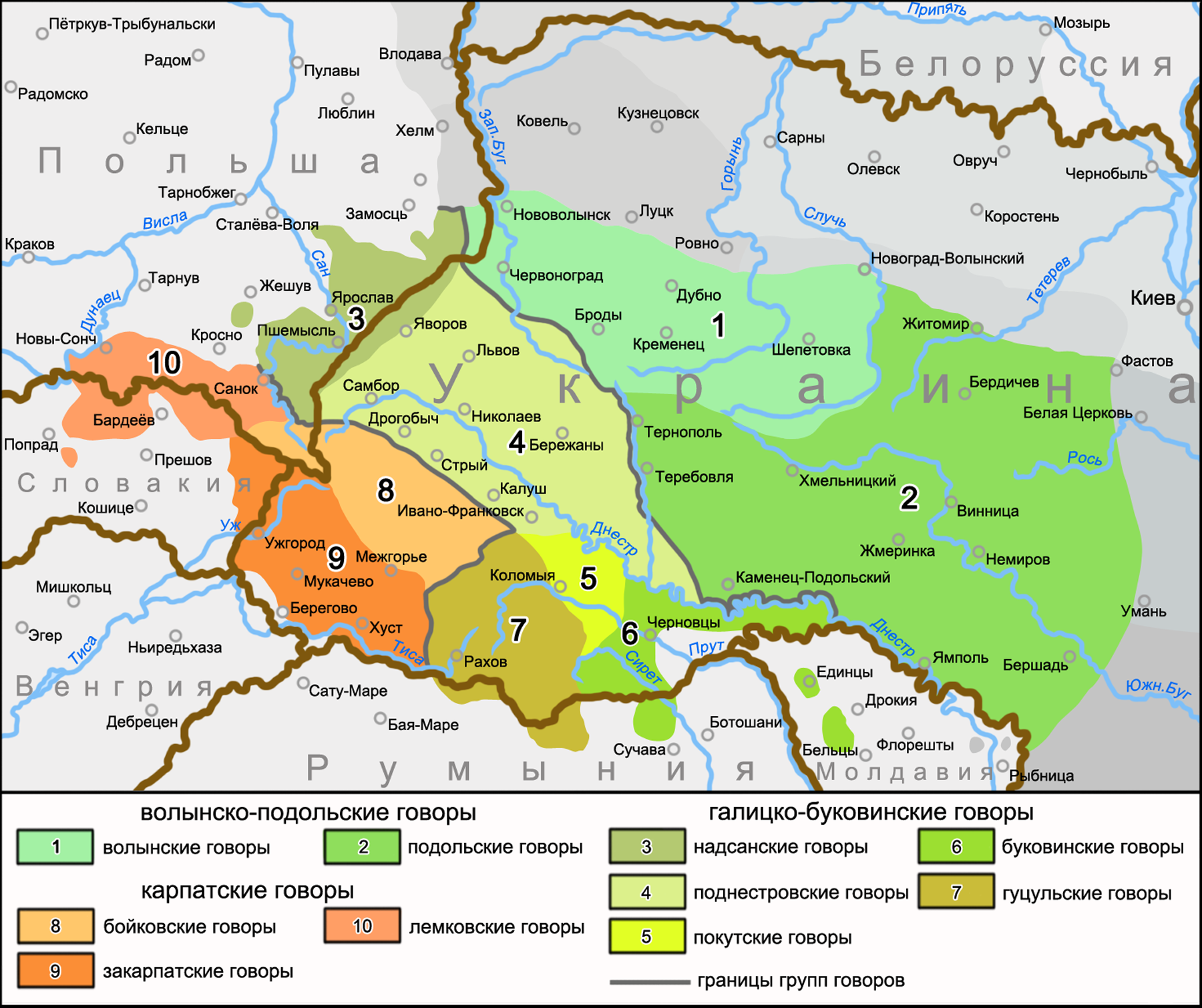
Detailed map of Southwestern Ukrainian dialects according to George Shevelov

Southwestern Ukrainian is broken into three dialect groups, each of which contain multiple dialects:

- Volhynian-Podolian group
  - Volhynian dialect (No.1 on the map)
  - Podolian dialect (No. 2)
- Galician–Bukovinian group
  - Dniestrian (No. 4)
  - Upper Sannian (No. 3)
  - Pokuttia–Bukovina (No. 5-6)
  - Hutsul (No. 7)
- Carpathian group
  - Boyko (No. 8)
  - Transcarpathian (No. 9)
  - Lemko (No. 10)
