= Ușurei =

Ușurei may refer to:

- Ușurei, a village in Răcăria Commune, Rîșcani District, Moldova
- Ușurei, a village in Șușani Commune, Vâlcea County, Romania
