= Hutsul dialect =

Variety of the Ukrainian language

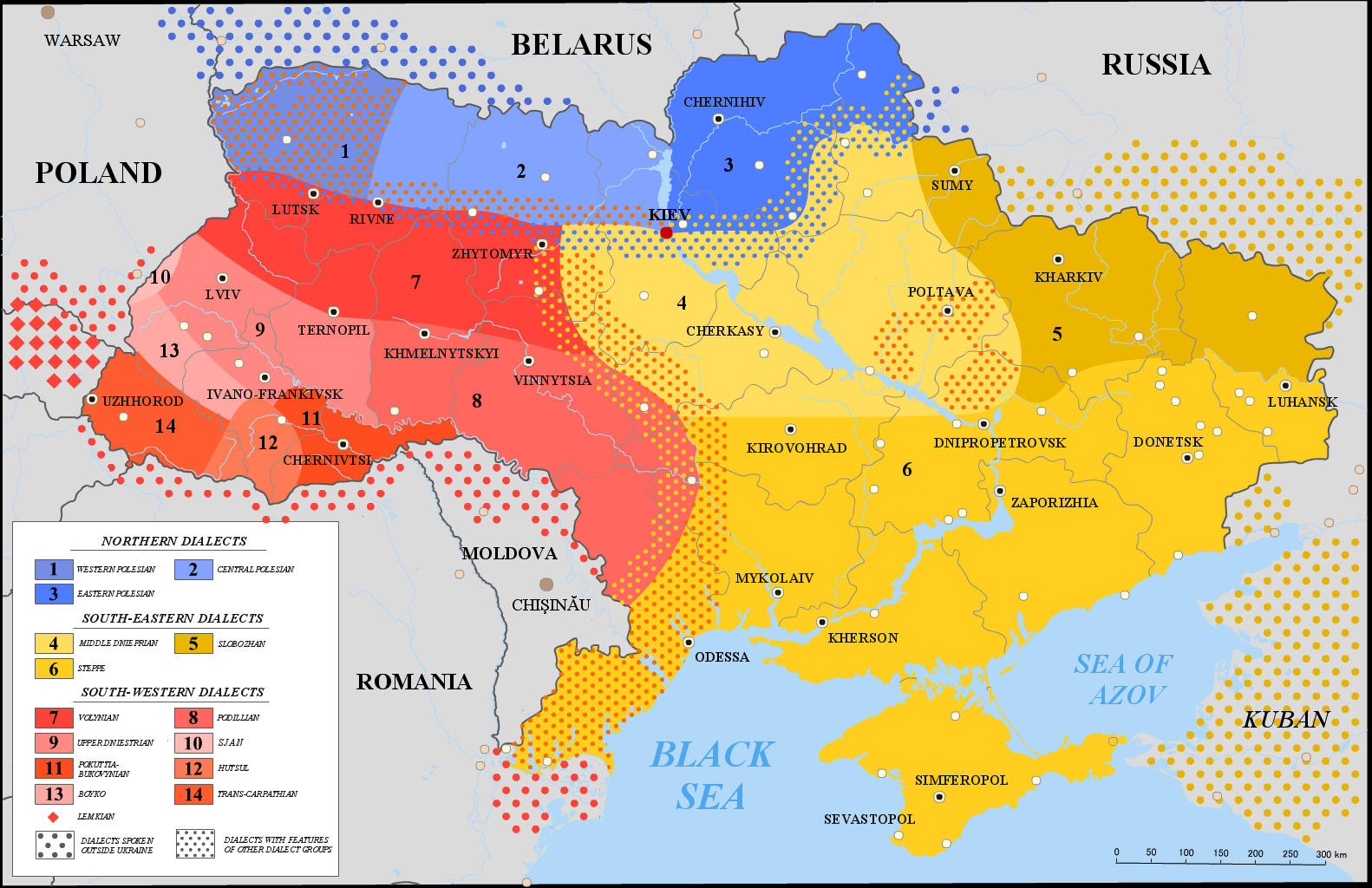
Areas of Ukraine in which Hutsul dialect is spoken are marked with no. 12.

Hutsul dialect (Ukrainian: Гуцульський говір) or Eastern Carpathian dialect (Східнокарпатський говір) is a variety of the Ukrainian language spoken by Hutsuls, a subethnic group living in Western Ukraine. It belongs to the Galician–Bukovinian group of Southwestern Ukrainian dialects.

== Geographic area ==
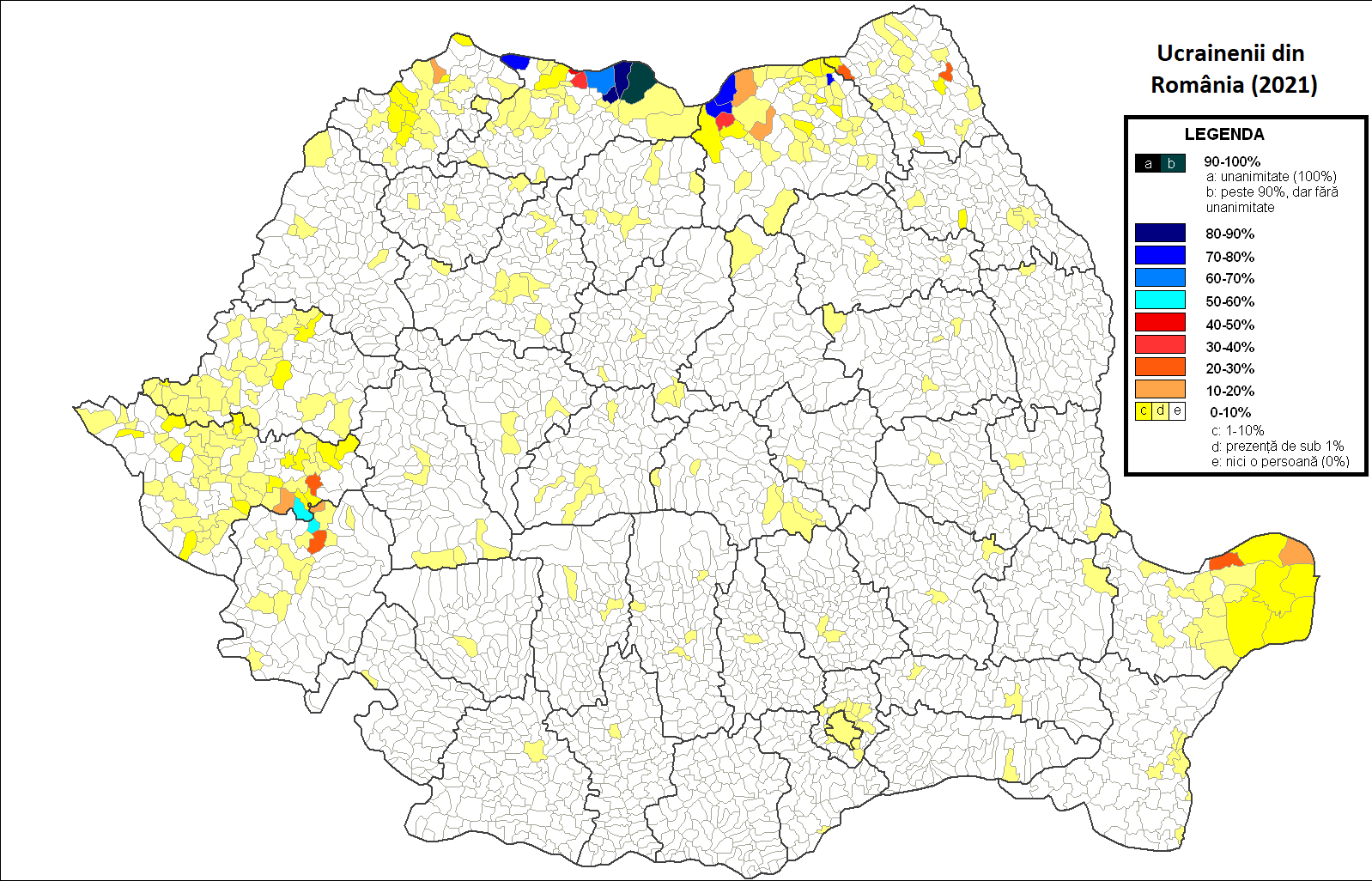
Map of Ukrainian population in Romania with Hutsul areas visible on the northern border

In Ukraine Hutsul dialect is spoken in eastern parts of Zakarpattia Oblast (Rakhiv Raion, western parts of Chernivtsi Oblast (Vyzhnytsia Raion) and southwestern parts of Ivano-Frankivsk Oblast (Verkhovyna, Kosiv, Nadvirna and Kolomyia raions). Outside of Ukraine, the Hutsul dialect is spoken in northern parts of Maramures and Suceava County in Romania.

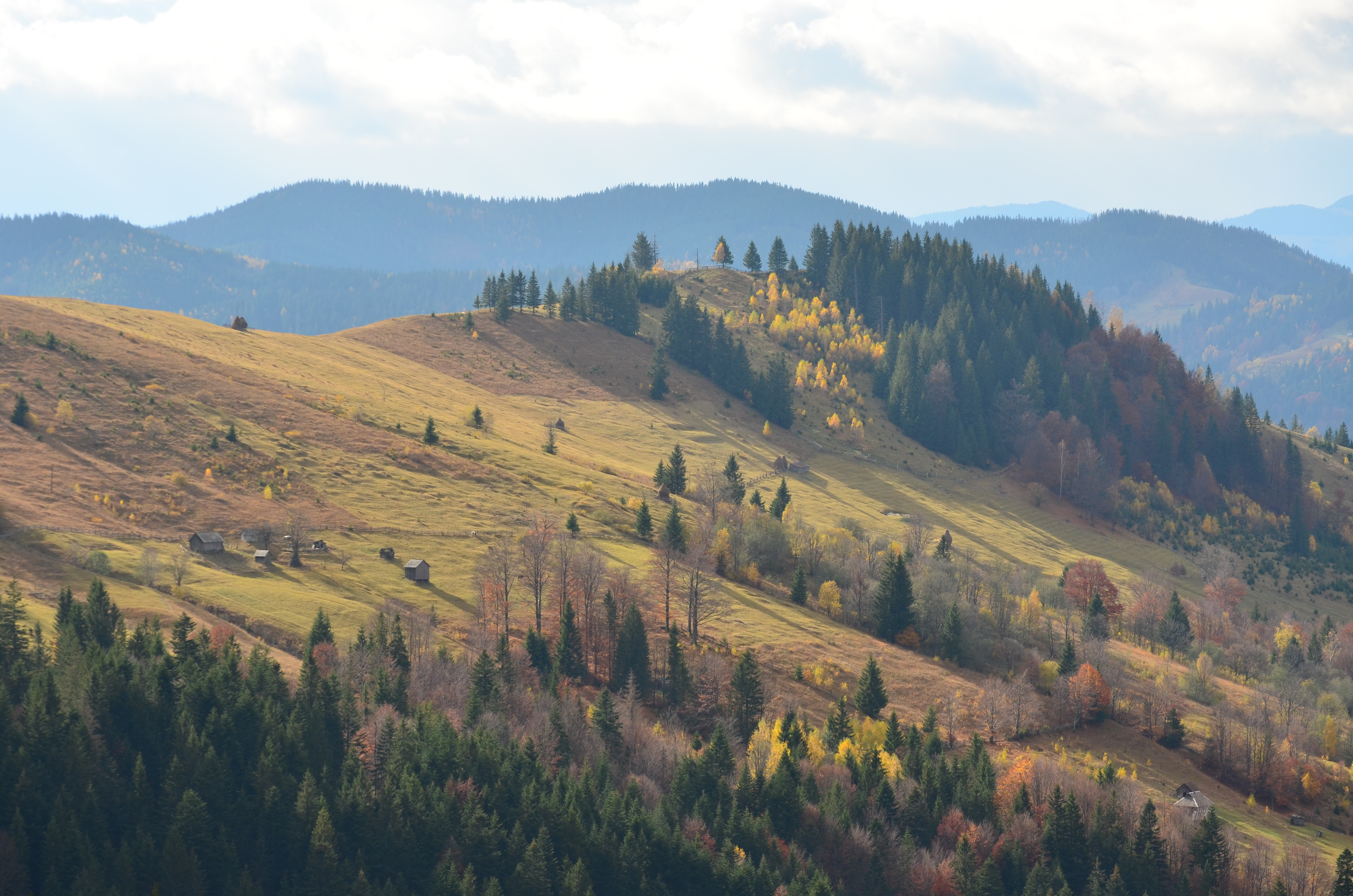
A landscape of Hutsulshchyna

In the west the area of Hutsul dialect borders Transcarpathian dialect, in the north – Boyko and Dniester dialects, in the east – Pokuttia–Bukovina dialect.

Some linguists consider varieties spoken in the areas of Sniatyn and Deliatyn along the Prut river to be a separate Upper Prutian dialect, transitional between Hutsul and Dniester dialects.

== Main features ==
=== Phonetics ===
- Varying development of certain phonemes in stressed and unstressed positions:
  - [e] in stressed position may take the form of [ɐ]: клäн [klɐn], сäрце [ˈsɐrt͡se], берäза [beˈrɐzɐ] (standard Ukrainian - клен [kɫɛn], серце [ˈsɛrt͡se], береза [beˈrɛzɐ];
  - [a] after palatalized consonants is changed in the same manner: ш’и́пка [ʃʲɐpkɐ], йі(е)к [jɐk] (standard Ukrainian - шапка [ˈʃɑpkɐ], як [jɑk]);
  - in unstressed position [a] is realized as [i]: гýслінка [ˈɦuslʲinkɐ], вечéр’іти [ʋeˈt͡ʃɛrʲite], кол’іднéк [kolʲidˈnek];
- [ɪ] is replaced by [e] or, sometimes, [i] in both stressed and unstressed positions: крéла [ˈkrelɐ], жéто [ˈʒeto], бекé [beˈke], вíмн’е [ˈʋʲimnʲe] (standard Ukrainian крила [ˈkrɪɫɐ], жито [ˈʒɪtɔ], бики [beˈkɪ], вимʼя [ˈʋɪmjɐ]);
- prefix ви- is replaced with ві-: вíтратити, віповíсти;
- widespread pronunciation of [ɪ], [ɨ], [u], [y] in place of etymological [o]: вин, вын, вун etc.;
- change of [o] into [ʊ] before stressed [u], [i], sometimes [a]: гуд’íўл’а, кужýх, похувáти;
- alveolar [l];
- palatalization of [r] in various positions: косáр’, вер’х; palatalization of sibilants and affricates: жоўч’, душ’é;
- dispalatalization of [t͡s], [s], [z] in word-final and some other positions: хлóпец, на вýлицу, шчос, кр’із;
- transition of [tʲ] into [kʲ]/[c], [dʲ] into [ɡʲ]/[ɟ]: к’éшко [ˈceʃkɔ], ґ’іт [ɟit] (standard Ukrainian - тяжко [ˈtʲɑʒkɔ], дід [dʲid]);
- assimilation of consonant clusters with [n]: перéнний, мéнник, мéник (standard Ukrainian - передній, мельник).
- in some varieties: moving of the stress on the first syllable (кóмар, дри́жу, нéсу).

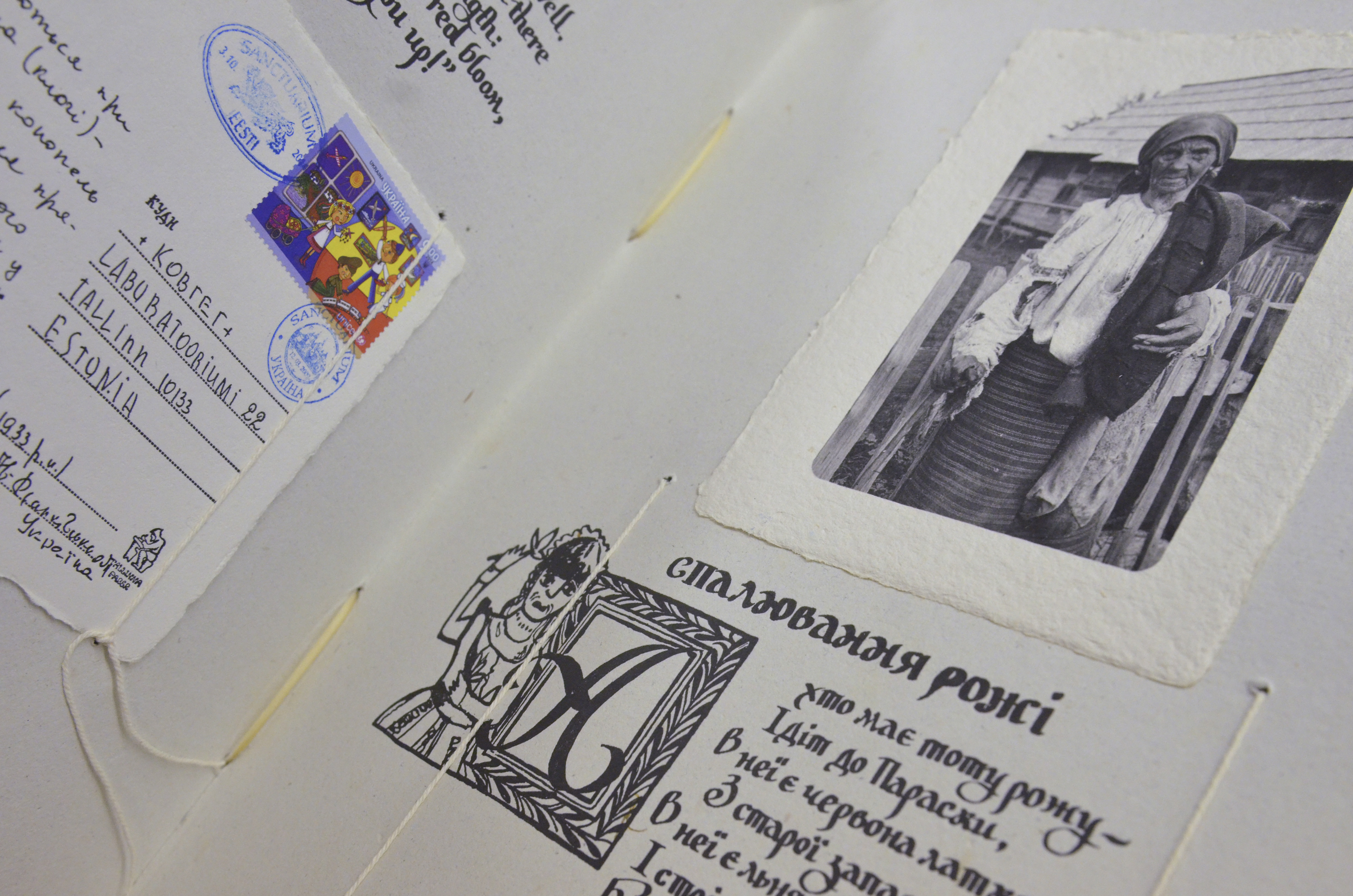
A piece of folk poetry composed in Hutsul dialect in a publication dedicated to Hutsul culture

=== Morphology ===
- forms -им, -их in dative and locative case of plural nouns: кон’им, пол’им, на кон’их, на пол’их;
- nouns ending with -а, -ja in instrumental case have endings -оў, -еў: рукóў, землéў;
- active use of dual forms with numbers 2,3,4: дві йéблуці, три ґ’íўці;
- creation of comparative adjectives with particle май (май здорóвий, май крáшчий);
- absence of epenthetical [lʲ] in verb forms of 1st person single and 3rd person plural in present and future tense: бáвйу, лóмйу, л’ýбйе;
- loss of word-final [t] in 3rd person single of 2nd declension verbs in present: вони́ хóдä, си́д’и;
- shortened ending -т in 3rd person single of 1st declension verbs in present: вони́ знат, співáт;
- verb forms сми (1st person present), бих (1st person past);
- conjunctive mood can be created with the use of particles бих, би: носи́ў бих, проси́елие бисмé;
- future tense can take forms like му ходи́ти or ходи́ти му, меш роби́ти and роби́ти меш;
- past tense - сме ходи́ли, ходи́ли сме;
- creation of personal verb forms with the use of infinitive: йíхайу, йíхайе, йíхайуть, смійáиутси etc.
- enclitic pronouns ми, ти, си.

== In literature ==
Recording of a Hutsul song from the area of Verkhovyna

Elements of Hutsul dialect are present in works of several Ukrainian writers including Hnat Khotkevych, Marko Cheremshyna and Vasyl Stefanyk.
