= Lemko dialect =

Language or dialect of Rusyn

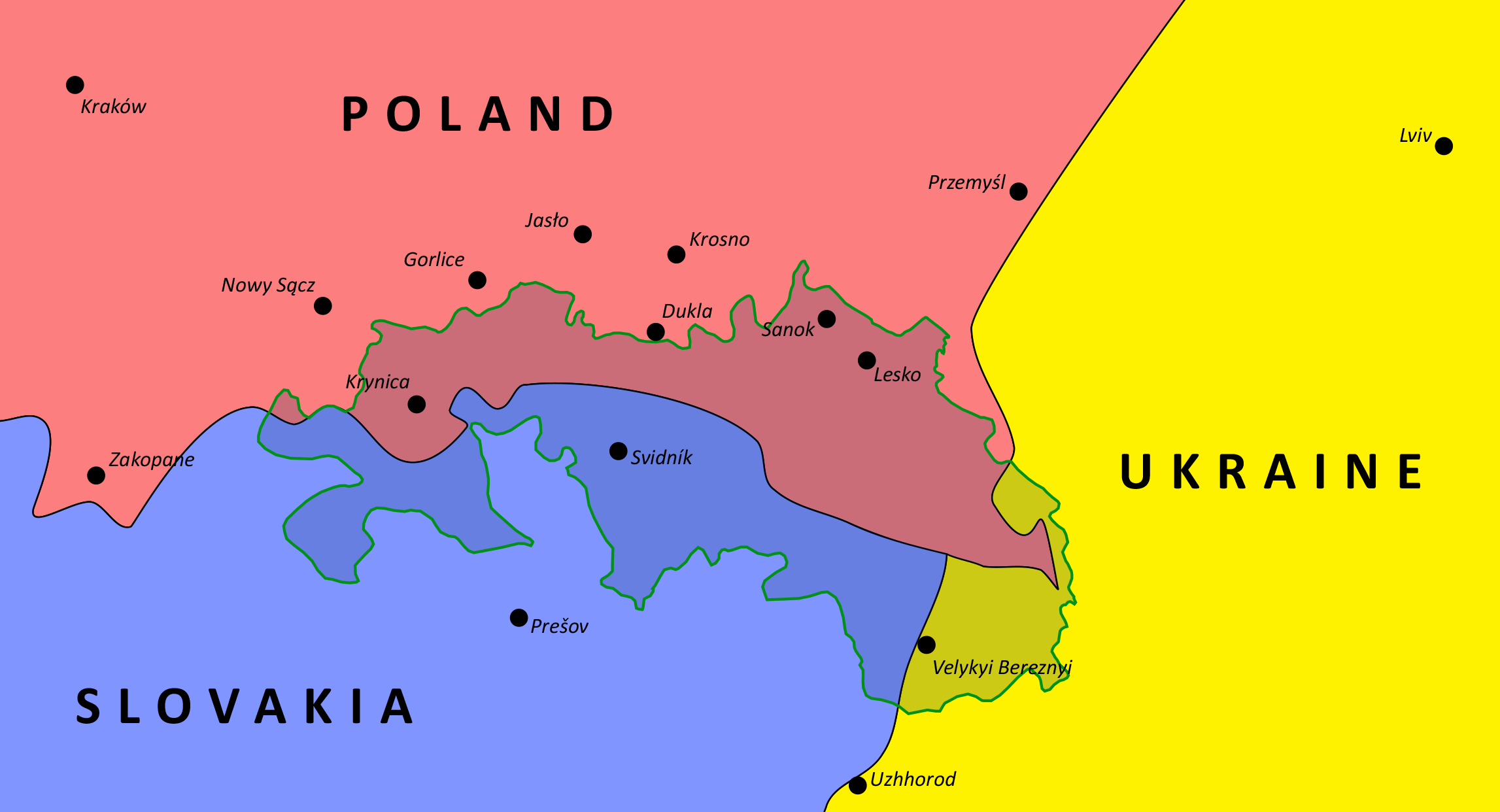
Map of the Lemko Region where Lemko dialect is spoken

The Lemko dialect (Ukrainian: Лемківський говір) or West Carpathian dialect (Ukrainian: Західнокарпатський говір) is a dialect spoken by Lemko people of the Carpathians in the border region of Ukraine, Slovakia and Poland. It is classified either as a dialect of the Rusyn language (by Carpatho-Rusyn sources and historiography), as part of the Southwestern dialects of the Ukrainian language (by Ukrainian sources and historiography), or as a separate language (by Lemko Rusyn autonomist sources and historiography).

== Geography ==
The Lemko dialect is spoken in Western Carpathians, in an area bordered by the Boyko and Transcarpathian dialects in the east, the Slovak language in the southwest and Polish language in the north. An enclave populated by speakers of a dialect similar to Lemko, spoken by a mixed population with roots also outside of the Lemko Region known as the Zamieszańcy ("mixed ones"), was also located in Polish ethnic territory between the towns of Strzyżów and Krosno, specifically in the villages around Bonarówka and Oparówka as well as Pietrusza Wola, and a few smaller separate exclaves. After the Second World War many Lemkos were forcibly resettled to the western regions of Poland or to Ukraine and other parts of the USSR, which resulted in further geographic spread of the dialect.

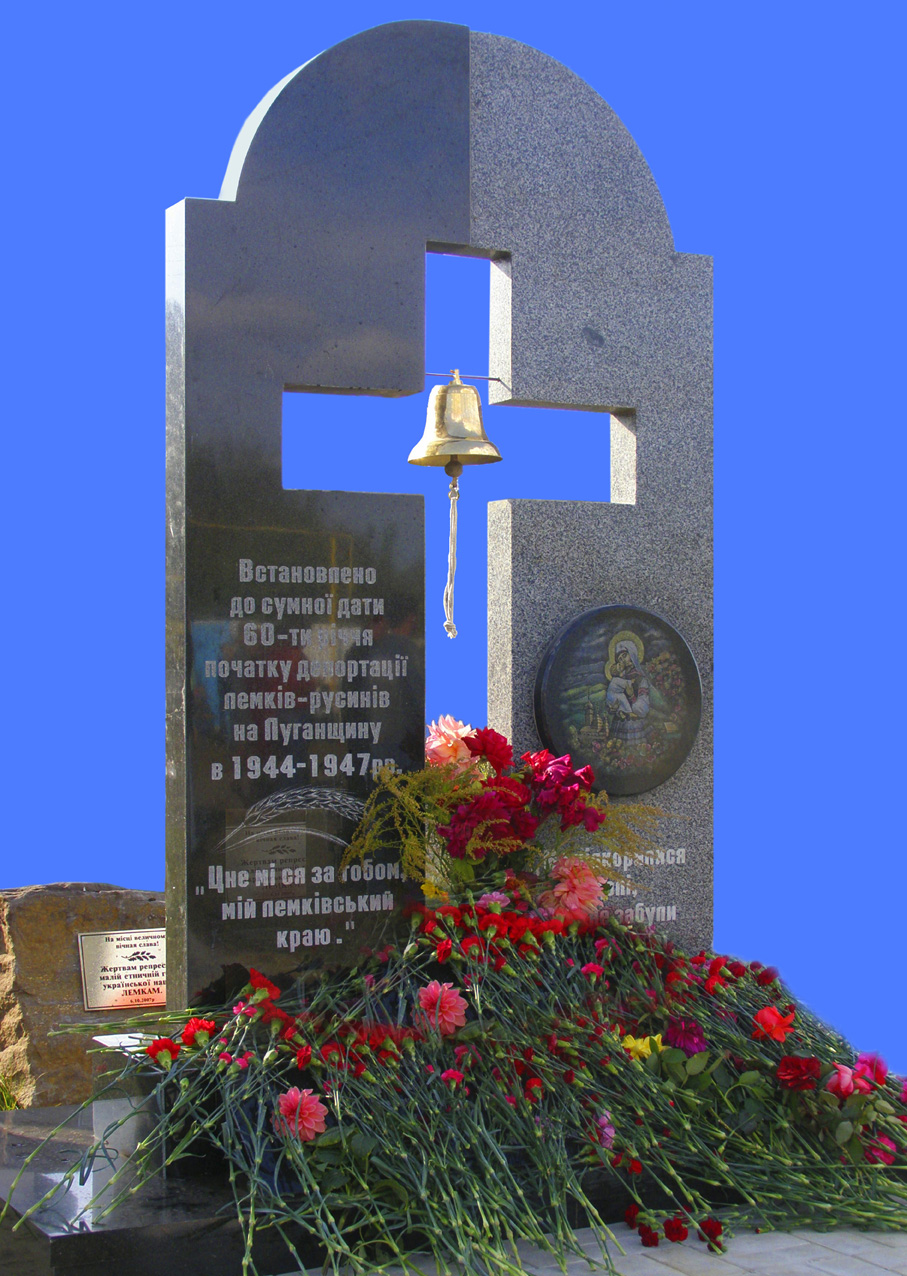
A monument to Lemkos who were deported to Luhansk Oblast, eastern Ukraine, with a quote in the Lemko dialect

== Name ==
The name of Lemko dialect derives from the locally used particle лем (lem), which means "only", "merely", "just". It is cognate with the Slovak word len and Czech word jen, and with the Slovene word le, as well as with the dialectal Polish jeno and ino, all with the same meaning. It is thereby distinguished from the Ukrainian language which uses the phrases лише (lyshe) and тільки (til'ky).

== Main features ==
- Most Lemko dialects have a fixed stress on the penultimate syllable: вóда [ˈʋɔdɐ], пирóги compared to standard Ukrainian водá [ʋɔˈda], пироги́;
- presence of phonemes [ɨ], [ɯ], [y];
- transition of [o] into [ʊ] in both stressed and unstressed positions before syllables with [i], [u], [a] and [u̯]: на дурузі [dʊˈrʊzʲi], путік [ˈpʊtʲik], знуў [znʊu̯], пулула [pʊˈlʊlɐ] (standard Ukrainian - на дорозі [doˈrɔzʲi], потік [poˈtʲik], знов [znɔu̯], полола [poˈlɔlɐ]);
- transition of [e] into [ɪ] before palatalized consonants: вир’х [ʋɪrʲx], типир’ [ˈtɪpɪrʲ] (standard Ukrainian - верх [ʋɛrx], тепер [teˈpɛr]);
- pronunciation of word-final [ɪ] as [ɪi̯], [ei̯]: колий [ˈkɔlɪi̯], гусий [ˈɦusɪi̯], ідий [ˈidɪi̯] (literary Ukrainian - коли [koˈlɪ], гуси [ˈɦusɪ], іди [iˈdɪ]);
- transition of original [e] into [u], [y]: вечÿр [ˈʋɛt͡ʃyr], т’утка [ˈtʲutkɐ] (standard Ukrainian - вечір [ˈʋɛt͡ʃʲir], тітка [ˈtʲitkɐ]);
- development of original cluster -ьr- into -ɪr-, -ɨr-, -ьl- into -ɨl-: гырміт [ˈɦɨrmʲit], дырва [ˈdɨrʋa], хирбет [ˈxɪrbɛt], былха [ˈbɨlxa] (standard Ukrainian - гримить [ɦrɪˈmɪtʲ], дрова [drɔˈʋɑ], хребет [xreˈbɛt], блоха [blɔˈxɑ]);
- intense palatalization of [t͡sʲ], [d͡zʲ], [sʲ], [zʲ], in some varieties [t͡ʃʲ] and [d͡ʒʲ] are only present in palatalized form; widespread replacement of [tʲ], [dʲ] with [t͡sʲ], [d͡zʲ]: ц’агне [ˈt͡sʲɑɦne], дз’’іц’’ми [ˈd͡zʲit͡sʲme] (standard Ukrainian - тягне [ˈtʲɑɦne], дітьми [dʲitʲˈmɪ]); in certain varieties some consonants are palatalized in front of etymological [e]: т’еп’ир [ˈtʲɛpʲɪr], с’ево [ˈsʲɛwɔ] (standard Ukrainian - тепер [teˈpɛr], село [seˈlɔ]); in other varieties [t], [n], [s], [t͡s] are not palatalized in word-final positions (кін [kʲin], вес [ʋɛs], opposed to literary Ukrainian - кінь [kʲinʲ], весь [ʋɛsʲ]), and palatalized [r] is absent;
- devoicing of word-final consonants in many varieties: мет [mɛt] (standard Ukrainian - мед [mɛd]);
- replacement of [l] with [u̯] before labialized and [w] before unlabialized vowels: пўух [pu̯ux], вава [ˈwɑʋɐ], ц’івий [ˈt͡sʲiwɪi̯] (literary Ukrainian - плуг [pluɦ], лава [ˈlɑʋɐ], цілий [ˈt͡sʲilɪi̯]);
- replacement of word-initial [w], [u̯] with [ɦ]: гдова [ˈɦdɔwɐ] (standard Ukrainian - вдова [wdɔˈʋɑ]); replacement of [w], [u̯] before unvoiced consonants with [x], [f]: x коморі, фчора [ˈft͡ʃɔrɐ] (standard Ukrainian - в коморі, вчора [ˈwt͡ʃɔrɐ]);
- archaic ending -ци in masculine plural nouns: парібци, войаци (literary Ukrainian - парубки, вояки);
- neutrum nouns in nominative case end with -ьа: весьíльа, жúтьа (standard Ukrainian - життя);
- ending -ы in adjective and certain pronouns in plural: здоровы;
- ending -ом in single nouns in instrumentative case, as well as in respective adjectives: добром жоном, тобом;
- dual ending -ма in instrumentative case of many nouns and pronouns: тыма, котрыма;
- shortened form -ой in genitive of single feminine adjectives: великой, славной (standard Ukrainian - великої, славної);
- declination of verbs according to muster читам, читаш, читат, читаме, читате (standard Ukrainian читаю, читаєш, читають, читаємо, читаєте);
- in eastern Lemko varieties: absence of [l] between labial consonants and [j] (купйу, робйат);
- creation of future tense with the use of verb бути and past participle: буду робив; sometimes also with infinitive: будéме вйазáти;
- use of particle да instead of де: дахто, дакому (standard Ukrainian - дехто, декому);
- widespread usage of prepositions ік, ґ, іґ, ку, ґу, пред, през etc.;
- in syntax: use of preposition with noun to denote an instrument used for a certain action (орати c пўугом, пише c пером); use of preposition о with nouns in locative or accusative (о н’ім знайу, о два дни, о холоды, о кривих лабах).

== Vocabulary distinctions ==
| Lemko | Standard Ukrainian | English |
|---|---|---|
| бич (bych) | батіг (batih) | whip (see Polish bicz) |
| гомбалка, гомбачка (hombalka, hombachka) | гойдалка (hoydalka) | swing |
| ґрулі (gruli) | картопля (kartoplya) | potatoes |
| жидлик (zhydlyk) | кварта (kvarta) | mug |
| керпці (kerptsi) | постоли (postoly) | leather shoes |
| кошуля (koshulia) | сорочка (sorochka) | shirt (from Polish koszula) |
| криж, марадик, ракош (kryzh, maradyk, rakosh) | копа (kopa) | stack (of hay) |
| кукуріца (kukuritsa) | кукурудза (kukurudza) | maize |
| ладний (ladnyj) | гарний (harnyj) | lovely, nice (see Polish ładny) |
| мишпергач (myshperhach) | кажан (kazhan) | bat (compare Polish gacek) |
| хваст (khvast) | бурʼян (buryan) | weed (from Polish chwast) |
| чотирдесять (chotyrdesiat') | сорок (sorok) | forty (compare Polish czterdzieści) |

== In culture ==
In modern Ukraine the dialect has been popularized through songs by musicians of Lemko origin, most prominently Khrystyna Soloviy and Sofia Fedyna. The Lemko song "Plyve Kacha" has been popularly used by Ukrainians as a requiem for those killed during the Euromaidan, Revolution of Dignity and the Russo-Ukrainian War.
