= Boyko dialect =

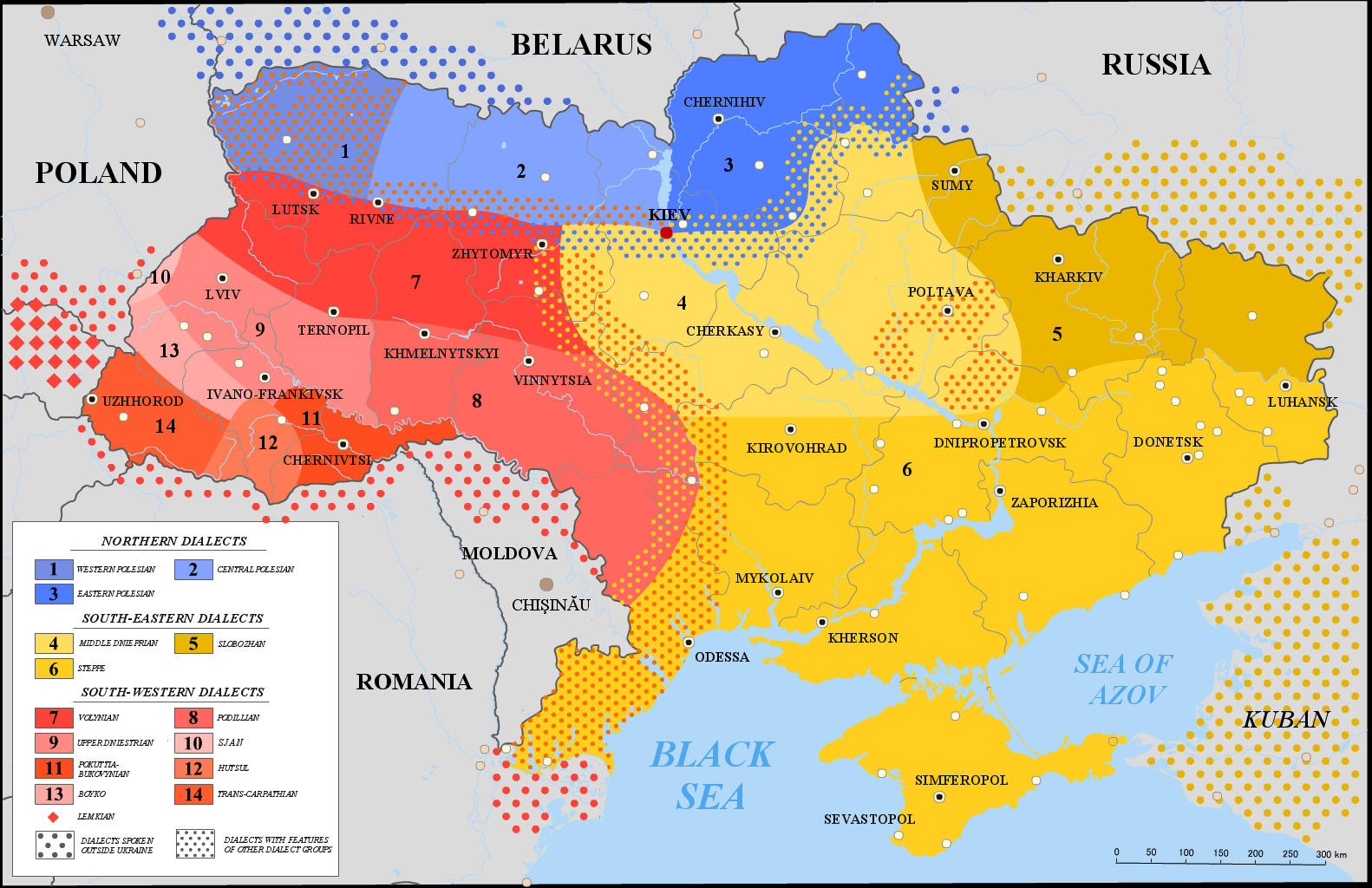
Map of Ukrainian dialects with Boyko dialect marked with no. 13

Boyko dialect (Ukrainian: Бойківський говір), also known as North Carpathian Dialect (Ukrainian: Північнокарпатський говір) is a dialect spoken by Boyko people who live in the Carpathian Mountains of Western Ukraine. It is usually classified among Southwestern dialects of the Ukrainian language.

== Name ==
The name of the dialect is derived from the colloquial expression бо-й-е (boye), which Boykos frequently use in the meaning "yes".

== Geography ==
The Boyko dialectal area borders Upper Dniestrian dialect in the north, Hutsul dialect in the east, Transcarpathian dialect in the south and Lemko dialect in the west. The region where the dialect is common includes the towns of Bolekhiv and Nadvirna.

Elements of Boyko dialect are also present among speakers of an eastern variety of Lemko dialect residing in the area between Rzeszów and Krosno, known as Zamishantsi.

== Main features ==
=== Phonetics ===
- Lack of distinction between [o] and [u] in unstressed position before syllables with close vowels;
- pronunciation of stressed [a] before [u̯] as [ɑ]: даў [dɑu̯], лáўка [ˈlɑu̯kɐ], зáўтра [ˈzɑu̯trɐ];
- lack of palatalization before word-final [i] in verbs like бьíоті [ˈbɨti], ходи́тî [xoˈdɪti];
- palatalization of consonants before [i] deriving from original [o], [e]: н’іч [nʲit͡ʃ], сн’іп [sʲnʲip], с’іл’ [sʲilʲ], с’ім [sʲim];
- palatalization of [t͡s], [s] in compounds -ський, -зький;
- distinction between [ɛ], [ɪ] in unstressed syllables;
- dialectal varieties of [е], [o] before palatalized consonants and [u̯]: тêпêр’ [tɪˈpɪrʲ], отиць [oˈtɪt͡sʲ]; ôс’ін’ [ˈʊsʲinʲ], бôўкати [ˈbʊu̯kɐte];
- transition of [ɪ] into [ɨ], [ɯ]: быкьí [bɨˈkɨ], хыжа [ˈxɯʒɐ]; in some varieties [ɪ] is replaced with [o] o [ɐ]: боў [bou̯], хáжа [ˈxɐʒɐ] (standard Ukrainian - бики [beˈkɪ], був [buu̯], хижа [ˈxɪʒɐ]);
- frequent palatalization of sibilants;
- frequent use of affricate [d͡ʒʲ]: йідж’ [jid͡ʒʲ], дождж’ [dɔʒd͡ʒʲ], мéдж’и [ˈmɛd͡ʒʲɪ], чудж’и́й [t͡ʃʊˈd͡ʒɪi̯];
- transition of word-initial [z] into [dz]: дзвізда;
- transition of [l] into [u̯] after vowels in some varieties: віў [ʋʲiu̯], ст’іў [sʲtʲiu̯], орéў [oˈrɛu̯], горíўка [ɦɔˈrʲiu̯kɐ];
- transformation of cluster [ʃk] into [t͡ʃʲk]: чькола;
- partial devoicing of word-final consonants;
- neutrum nouns in nominative case end with -ьа: весьільа, житьа (standard Ukrainian - життя);
- replacement of [nʲ] with [j] before [k]: старéйкый [stɐˈrɛi̯kɨi̯], малéйкый [mɐˈlɛi̯kɨi̯];
- transition of [b], [v] into [m] when followed by [n]: др’імньíй [drʲimˈnɨi̯], р’íмний [ˈrʲimnɪi̯];
- loss of [j] in intervocal and word-final positions: мôá [mʊˈa], вóс’ко [ˈʋɔsʲkɔ], злы [zlɨ];
- lack of epenthetical [l] after labial consonants: л’ýбйу ['lʲubjʊ], ўхôпйу [wxopˈju];
- different variants of [l] sound: alveolar [l] is most widespread in Boyko varieties spoken in Transcarpathia;
- presence of palatalized [t], [t͡s], [r], [ʃ], [ʒ], [z]: пастирь, шьапка, жьаба, близький;
- stress is commonly preserved in the word root: кáжу — кáжеш — кáже, прóшу — прóсиш, бýла — бýли, нéсла — нéсло — нéсли.

=== Grammar and morphology ===
- Prevalence of ending [a] in genitive case of masculine nouns: стáва, с’н’íга; feminine nouns with former -j- base in genitive have endings [ɪ], [e]: до цер’кви, цер’кве;
- prevalence of ending -ови among masculine and neutral nouns in dative: брáтови, селови;
- endings of single feminine nouns and corresponding adjectives and pronouns in instrumentative - -оў, -еў: межéў, сóлеў, землéў, крýчеў; the common endings of masculine nouns with -ец’, as well as neutral with stem ending with -ц in instrumentative case is -ом (пáл’ц’ом, сóнц’ом);
- presence of masculine plural forms of nouns such as братове, сынóве, столóве, вóўци;
- masculine and neutral plural nouns in dative can have endings -ом, -ум, -ім: сватóм, сéлом, вóлум, брáт’ім, л’ýд’ім, кýр’ім;
- plural nouns in instrumentative case frequently have the ending -ма (-ома): кíн’ма, гроши́ма, кін’ц’óма, братóма, пал’ц’óма, пóл’ома; in certain varieties endings of the type з быкьí, зі ставьí have been preserved;
- in locative case of plural masculine and neutral nouns forms -ох, -ах, -ix prevail: у гос’ц’ох, на л’уд’ох, на сан’іх;
- shortening of personal forms in verbs of 1st declension: знáу, знáут, читáу, читáут, знаш, читаш, пи́таш, бíгаш, знат, чи́тат, бíгат;
- prevalence of complex future forms with infinitive: буду ходити;
- prevalence of ending -ме in present-tense verbs in 1st person single: йдемé, беремé, нóсиме; in imperative mood verbs in 1st person plural take the forms -ме, -іме: ход’íме, стáн’ме; in 2nd person plural - -те, -іте: нес’íте, пиш’íте ;
- use of past forms мáўім, знáўім, писáўім;
- shortened forms of personal pronouns in genitive and dative: н’а, т’а, ми, ти;
- use of directional pronouns нон, нонá, нонó, той, тотá, тотó, in instrumental case plural - ноньíма, тьíма, тотьíма;
- presence of unshortened adjective endings дóбрийі, зльíйі;
- reverse order of formation in numerals: два двáдц’ат’ = 22, три сорок = 43;
- comparative adjective forms are created with the adverb ще: ш’ч’е л’іпш’ий, ш’ч’е гірш’ий, ш’ч’е л’іпш’е, ш’ч’е гірш’е.

=== Lexicon ===
Among archaic terms present in Boyko dialect are words such as бýкарт [ˈbukɐrt] or пожали́ўник [poʒɐˈlɪu̯nɪk] - "bastard", "illegitimate child", вíблиц’а [ˈʋiblɪt͡sʲɐ] - "long pole", дереви́ш’ч’е [dereˈʋɪʃt͡ʃe] - "coffin", дот’áмл’у [dʊˈtʲɑmlʲʊ] - "(I) remember", жали́ва [ʒɐˈlɪʋɐ] - "nettle", змíткы [ˈzmʲitkɨ] - "old shoes", зáк’іл’ [ˈzakʲilʲ] - "yet", з’вір’ [zʲʋʲirʲ] - "ravine", лужáнка [lʊˈʒɑnkɐ] - "forest clearing", н’ай [nʲɑi̯] - "let", "let it be" (particle); пáртиц’а [ˈpartɪt͡sʲɐ] - "ribbon", потурайкьí [potʊrɐi̯ˈkɨ] - "currant", рубáт’а [rʊˈbɑtʲɐ] - "underwear", ýб’іч’ [ˈubʲit͡ʃʲ] - "mountain slope", ўтêрáник [wtɪˈrɑnɪk] - "towel", шáт’а [ˈʃɑtʲɐ] - "clothes", чêл’ад’ [ˈt͡ʃɪlʲɐdʲ] - "people", чêл’ади́на [t͡ʃɪlʲɐˈdɪnɐ] - "person", чêл’áн:ик [t͡ʃɪˈlʲanːɪk] - "man".

== In literature ==
Elements of Boyko dialect are present in the works of Ukrainian writer Ivan Franko.
