= Dniestrian Ukrainian dialect =

Dialect of Ukrainian

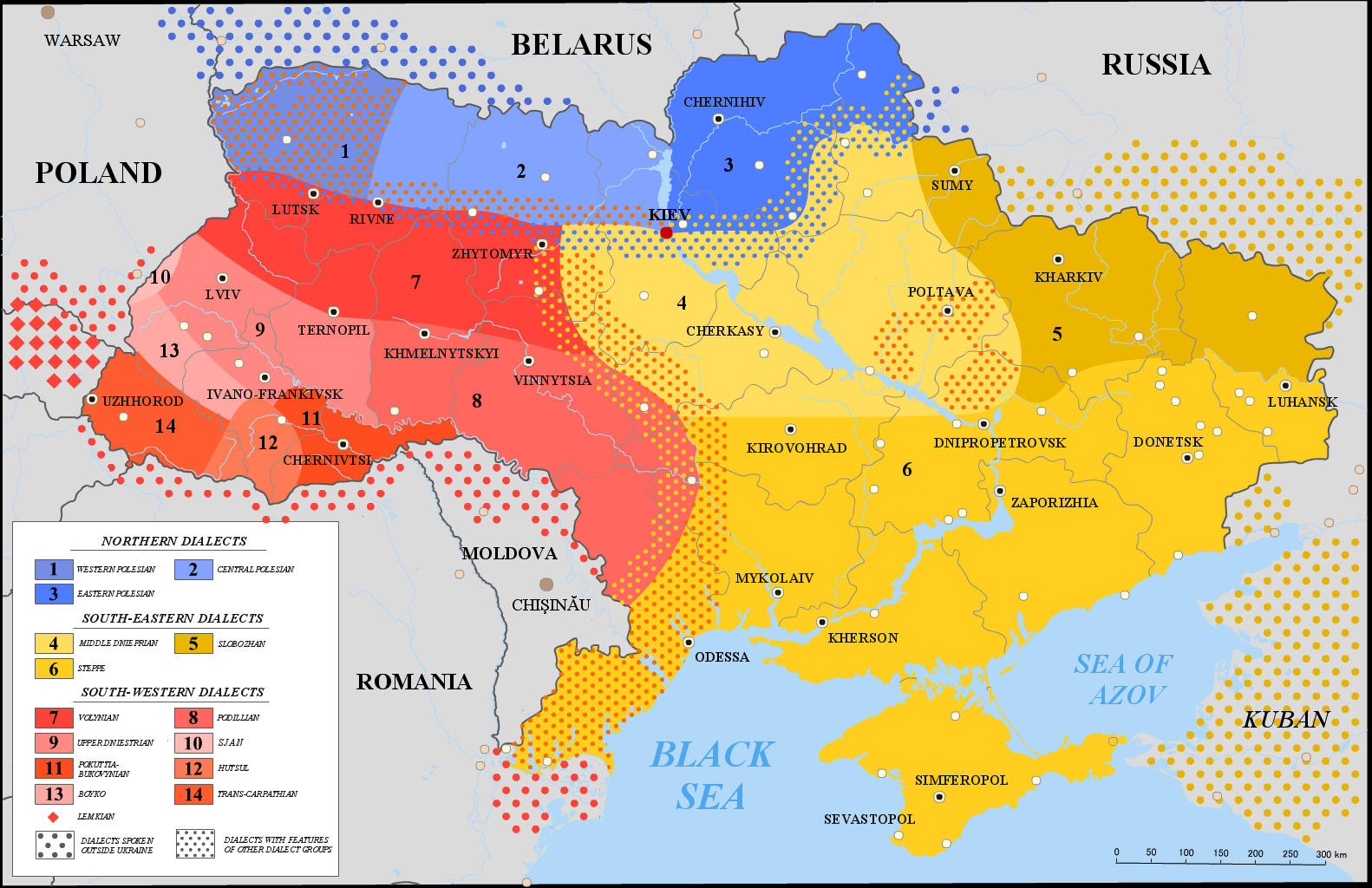
Areas of Ukraine by dialect: in the light red area (number 9) Dniestran dialect is spoken

The Dniestrian Ukrainian dialect (Ukrainian: Наддністрянський говір, romanized: Naddnistrianskyi hovir), Opillia dialect (Ukrainian: опільський говір) or Galician (Halychian) dialect (Ukrainian: галицький говір) is a dialect of Ukrainian spoken in the western part of Ukraine, along the upper flow of the Dniester river. The Dniestrian Ukrainian dialect is typically grouped together with other southwestern dialects of Ukrainian.

== Origins ==
The dialect formed during the 14-16th centuries as a result of interaction between Pokutian-Bukovinian, Sian and western part of Podolian dialects.

== Main features ==
=== Phonetics ===
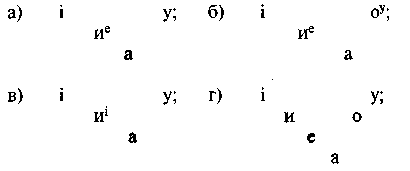
Variation of unstressed vowels in Dniestrian dialect

Main phonetic features which distinguish the Dniestrian dialect from other varieties of Ukrainian are:

- transition of the vowel [a] (derived from old [a], [ɛ̃]) into [e], [ɛ], [ɪ] following palatalized consonants: гарьичий [ɦɐˈrʲet͡ʃɪi̯], дєкувати [ˈdʲɛkʊwɐtɪ], сажі [ˈsaʒɪ], compared to standard Ukrainian - гарячий [ɦɐˈrʲɑt͡ʃɪi̯], дякувати [ˈdʲɑkʊwɐtɪ], сажа [ˈsaʒɐ];
- different formation of personal forms in some verbs, for example любˈять [ˈlʲubjɐtʲ], ловˈять [ˈlɔu̯jɐtʲ] instead of Standard Ukrainian люблять [ˈlʲublʲɐtʲ], ловлять [ˈlɔu̯lʲɐtʲ];
- so-called ukannya - pronunciation of unstressed [ɔ] as [ʊ]: бджула [b(d)ʒʊˈlɑ], скору [ˈskɔrʊ] compared to literary Ukrainian бджола [bd͡ʒɔˈlɑ], скоро [ˈskɔro];
- change of [e] into [ɪ], [i] with softening of preceding consonant in unstressed positions: спечіна [ˈspɛt͡ʃʲinɐ] instead of standard спечена [ˈspɛt͡ʃenɐ];
- widespread use of [w] before word-initial [ɔ], [ʊ] and [i] (derived from [ɔ]): вогірок [woɦʲiˈrɔk], воріх [woˈrʲix] compared to standard Ukrainian огірок [oɦʲiˈrɔk], горіх [ɦoˈrʲix]; in some varieties [w] is replaced with [l]: локунь [ˈɫɔkʊnʲ] instead of standard окунь [ˈɔkʊnʲ]; usage of [j] before word-initial [a], [i] is also widespread: їндик [ˈjindɪk] instead of індик [ˈindɪk];
- softer pronunciation of sibilants in word roots with preservation of original [ɛ]: шестий [ˈʃɛstɪi̯], вечєріти [ʋet͡ʃɛˈrʲitɪ] compared to standard Ukrainian шостий [ˈʃɔstɪi̯], вечоріти [ʋet͡ʃɔˈrʲitɪ];
- softening of consonants in -ки-, -хи- in both stressed and unstressed positions: глибокій [ɦlɪˈbɔkʲii̯], лихєй [lɪˈxʲɛi̯] compared to standard Ukrainian глибокий [ɦlɪˈbɔkɪi̯], лихий [lɪˈxɪi̯];
- shortening of -iy- into -i-: віт [ʋʲit] instead of standard Ukrainian війт [ʋʲii̯t];
- big local variation in pronunciation of certain vowels and vowel combinations: свʼято [ˈsʋjɑtɔ], цвʼях [ˈt͡sʋjɑx] or свато [ˈsʋɑtɔ], цвах [t͡sʋɑx] compared to standard Ukrainian свято [ˈsʲʋʲɑtɔ], цвях [t͡sʲʋʲɑx]; здоровлє [zdoˈrɔu̯lʲɛ], памніть [ˈpɑmnʲitʲ] instead of literary здоровʼя [zdoˈrɔu̯jɐ], памʼять [ˈpɑmjɐtʲ]; some varieties of Dniestrian dialect have an exclusively "hard" [r] - зора [zɔˈrɑ], зорʼя [zɔrˈjɑ], in others it can be palatalized, like in standard Ukrainian - зоря [zɔˈrʲɑ];
- unlike in most other Ukrainian varieties, devoicing of consonants at the end of the word and before other unvoiced consonants is widespread in Dniestrian dialect;
- disappearance or replacement of [w] in word-initial positions and [u̯] in consonant clusters: пав [pɑu̯], міти [ˈmʲitɪ], дамно [dɐmˈnɔ], рімний [ˈrʲimnɪi̯] compared to normative Ukrainian впав [wpɑu̯], вміти [ˈwmʲitɪ], давно [dɐu̯ˈnɔ], рівний [ˈrʲiu̯nɪi̯]; at the same time, "hard" [l] at the end of a syllable may be replaced with [u̯]: попіў [ˈpɔpʲiu̯], стіў [sʲtʲiu̯], гоўка [ˈɦɔu̯kɐ] unlike standard попіл [ˈpɔpʲiɫ], стіл [sʲtʲiɫ], голка [ˈɦɔɫkɐ].
- widespread change of [ʒ], [z], [tʲ], [dʲ], [k], [xʋ] in some words into [d͡ʒ], [d͡z], [c], [ɟ], [ɡ] and [f] respectively: саджє [ˈsɑd͡ʒʲɛ], дзерно [d͡zerˈnɔ], дзелений [d͡zeˈlɛnɪi̯], скіна [sʲciˈnɑ], наґія [nɐˈɟijɐ], гадюґа [ɦɐˈdʲuɡɐ], фалити [fɐˈlɪtɪ], форий [ˈfɔrɪi̯] compared to standard Ukrainian сажа [ˈsɑʒɐ], зерно [zerˈnɔ], зелений [zeˈlɛnɪi̯], стіна [sʲtʲiˈnɑ], надія [nɐdʲijɐ], гадюка [ɦɐˈdʲukɐ], хвалити [xʋɐˈlɪtɪ], хворий [ˈxwɔrɪi̯];
- unsystematic development of old trъt clusters into -ир, -ри, -ро depending on the word form: кирниця [kerˈnɪt͡sʲɐ], кривавий [krɪˈʋaʋɪi̯], дрива [dreˈʋɑ], брови [ˈbrɔʋɪ] compared to standard Ukrainian криниця [krɪnˈɪt͡sʲɐ], кривавий, дрова [drɔˈʋɑ], брови;
- shortening of soft consonants in forms of neutral nouns: жикє [ʒɪˈcɛ], насінє [nɐˈsʲinʲɛ] in contrast to життя [ʒɪtʲːa], насіння [nɐˈsʲinʲːɐ] in standard Ukrainian;
- lack of palatalization of word-final [t͡s]: хлопиц [ˈxlɔpet͡s], жнец [ʒnɛt͡s] compared to standard Ukrainian хлопець [ˈxlɔpet͡sʲ], жнець [ʒnɛt͡sʲ];
- pronunciation of vowels in some roots differs from standard Ukrainian: дюра [dʲʊˈrɑ], видро [ʋedˈrɔ], зазуля [zɐˈzulʲɐ] compared to literary діра [dʲiˈrɑ], відро [ʋʲidˈrɔ], зозуля [zɔˈzulʲɐ]; assimilation in consonant clusters such as -лн-, -рн- is also widespread: мел:ик [ˈmɛlːɪk], мен:ик [ˈmɛnːɪk], терлиця [terˈlɪt͡sʲɐ] instead of standard pronunciation мельник [ˈmɛlʲnɪk], терниця [terˈnɪt͡sʲɐ];
- in some local varieties of Dniestrian dialect final consonants [ɦ] and [i̯] are eliminated: порі [poˈrʲiː], сні [sʲnʲiː], гроше [ˈɦrɔʃeː] compared to standard Ukrainian поріг [poˈrʲiɦ], сніг [sʲnʲiɦ], грошей [ˈɦrɔʃei̯];
- palatalized consonants [zʲ], [sʲ], [t͡sʲ], [d͡zʲ] in Dniestrian dialect are normally pronounced softer than in other dialects and in literary Ukrainian;
- many pronouns, nouns and verbs in Dniestrian dialect have their accents on different syllables than in standard Ukrainian: мóго [ˈmɔɦo], твóго [ˈtʋɔɦo], хóджу [ˈxɔd͡ʒʊ], прóшу [ˈprɔʃʊ], трýна [ˈtrunɐ], кочéрга [koˈt͡ʃɛrɦɐ], пíду [ˈpidʊ] compared to standard Ukrainian могó [moˈɦɔ], твогó [tʋoˈɦɔ], ходжý [xoˈd͡ʒu], прошý [proˈʃu], трунá [trʊˈna], кочергá [kɔt͡ʃeˈrɦɑ], підý [piˈdu].

=== Grammar and word structure ===
Many words attain different forms in Dniestrian dialect than in standard Ukrainian:

- endings of feminine single nouns in instrumental case: землеў [zemˈlɛu̯], душеў [dʊˈʃɛu̯], головоў [ɦoloˈʋɔu̯], ногом [noˈɦɔm], солем [ˈsɔlem] (standard Ukrainian - землею [zemˈlɛjʊ], душею [dʊˈʃɛjʊ], головою [ɦɔlɔˈʋɔjʊ], ногою [nɔˈɦɔjʊ], сіллю [ˈsʲilʲːʊ]); in genitive case: ріли [rʲiˈlɪ], земли [zemˈlɪ], ночи [ˈnɔt͡ʃe], любови [lʲʊˈbɔwe] (standard Ukrainian - ріллі [rʲilʲːi], землі [zemˈlʲi], ночі [ˈnɔt͡ʃi], любові [lʲʊˈbɔwi]); in genitive plural: бабіў [bɐˈbʲiu̯], козіў [koˈzʲiu̯], козуў [ˈkɔzʊu̯] (standard Ukrainian баб [bab], кіз [kʲiz]);
- endings of masculine single nouns in dative: братови [ˈbrɑtɔwɪ], коневи [koˈnɛwɪ], конови [koˈnɔwɪ] (standard Ukrainian братові [ˈbratɔwʲi], коневі [kɔˈnɛwʲi]); in instrumental: коном [koˈnɔm] (standard Ukrainian конем [koˈnɛm]); in locative у кінци [kʲinˈt͡sɪ] (standard Ukrainian у кінці [kʲinʲˈt͡sʲi]); in dative plural: конім [koˈnʲim], конем [koˈnɛm], коном [koˈnɔm] (in standard Ukrainian коням [koˈnʲam]); in instrumental plural: гостями [ɦosʲˈtʲame], гостєми [ɦosʲˈtʲɛme], гостєма [ɦosʲˈtʲɛmɐ], гостіма [ɦosʲˈtʲimɐ] (in standard Ukrainian only гостями); in single locative plural: на грудьох [ɦrʊˈdʲɔx], на дверох [dʋeˈrɔx] (standard Ukrainian на грудях [ɦrʊˈdʲax], на дверях [dʋeˈrʲax];
- certain neutrum single nouns in genitive: теляті [teˈlʲɛtʲi], телятʼа [teˈlʲɛtʲɐ], телята [teˈlʲɛtɐ] (standard Ukrainian теляти [teˈlʲatɪ]); in dative: теляту [teˈlʲɛtʊ], телятʼу [teˈlʲɛtʲʊ] (standard Ukrainian - теляті [teˈlʲatʲi]); in instrumental: телятьом [teˈlʲɛtʲom], телятом [teˈlʲɛtom] (standard Ukrainian телям [teˈlʲɑm]);
- shortening of endings in adjectives: добри [ˈdɔbrɪ], молоді [ˈmɔlodʲi] (standard Ukrainian - добрий [ˈdɔbrɪi̯], молодій [mɔlɔˈdʲii̯]); assimilation in comparative adjectives: молоч:и [moˈlɔt͡ʃːɪ] (standard Ukrainian - молодший [mɔˈlɔd͡ʒʃɪi̯]);
- different structure of many numerals: оден [oˈdɛn], їден [jiˈdɛn], єден [jeˈdɛn] (in standard Ukrainian - один [oˈdɪn]), штири [ˈʃtɪrɪ] (standard Ukrainian - чотири [t͡ʃɔˈtɪre), одинайціть, єдинайцік (literary Ukrainian - одинадцять); in instrumental case: двума [dʋʊˈmɑ] (standard Ukrainian двома [dʋɔˈmɑ]); complex numerals піўтретя, піўчетверта (literary Ukrainian - пів на третю, пів на четверту), девʼїдесєть, девидесєк (standard Ukrainian - девʼяносто), двіста, двасто (in standard Ukrainian - двісті);
- dative forms of pronouns ми, ти (standard Ukrainian мені, тобі); locative pronoun form него (standard Ukrainian - його); instrumental forms неў, тоў (literary Ukrainian - нею, тою); directional pronoun тамтой (in standard Ukrainian only той);
- different verb forms: infinitive печи, стрихчи (standard Ukrainian пекти, стригти); present 1st person form лєю, лєїш (standard Ukrainian ллю. ллєш); 3rd person ending ходит, ходят (standard Ukrainian ходить, ходять); parallel usage of present past person plural verbs несемо and несем, ходимо and ходим (standard Ukrainian несемо, ходимо); lack of ending in 2nd person present singular of some verbs: дась, їсь (standard Ukrainian даси, їси); usage of future form буду браў (standard Ukrainian - буду брати), past forms ходиў, ходиўїм, ходивем, робили, робилисмо (in standard Ukrainian only ходив, робили); subjunctive mood forms даў бим, даў бис (standard Ukrainian - дав би);
- widespread usage of particular suffixes and affixes: -май, -мак, -кут, -уємци, -иск(о), -анк(а), -альник.

=== Lexical features ===
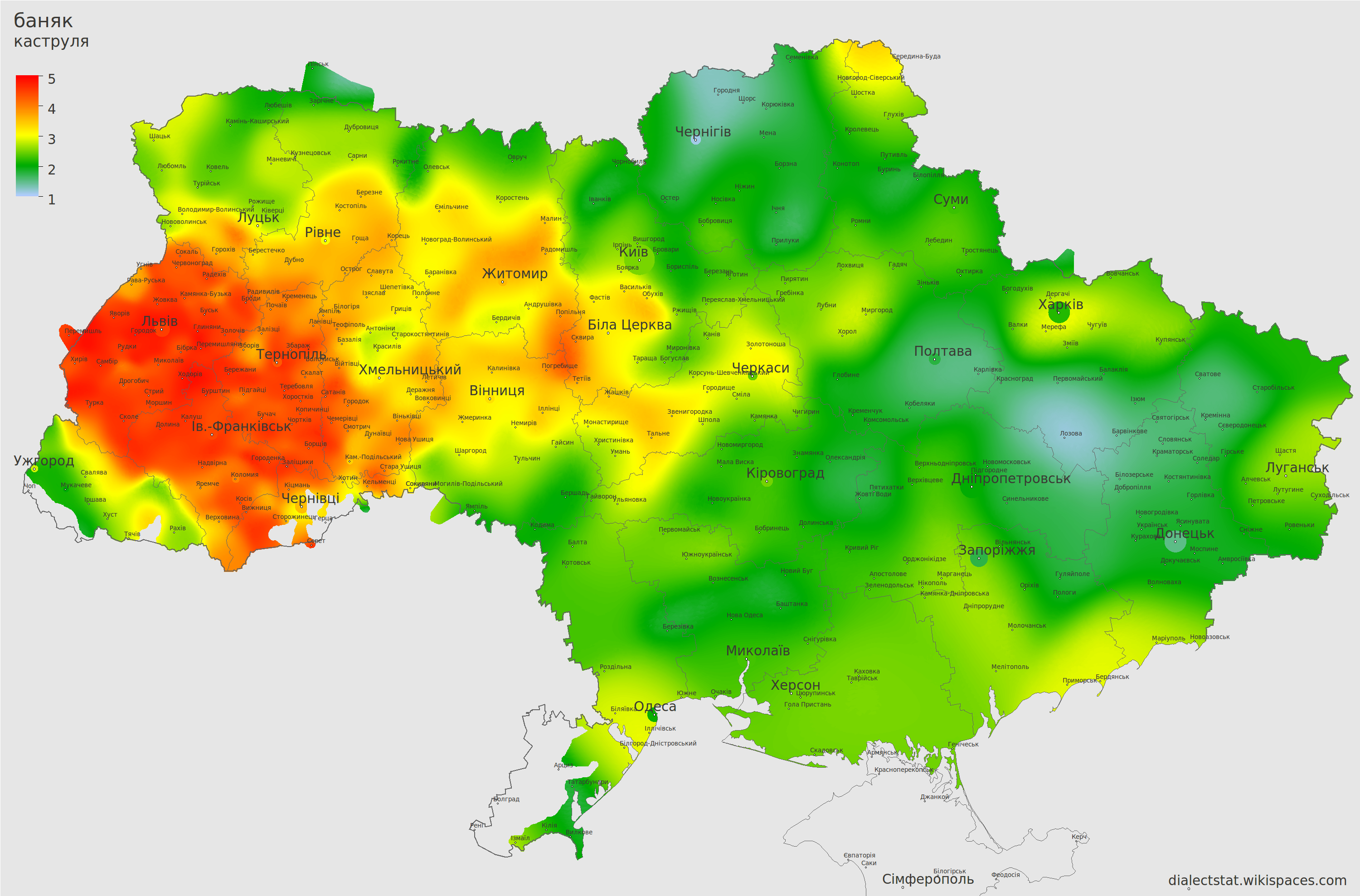
Areas with the most common usage of the word баняк (banyak) in Ukraine

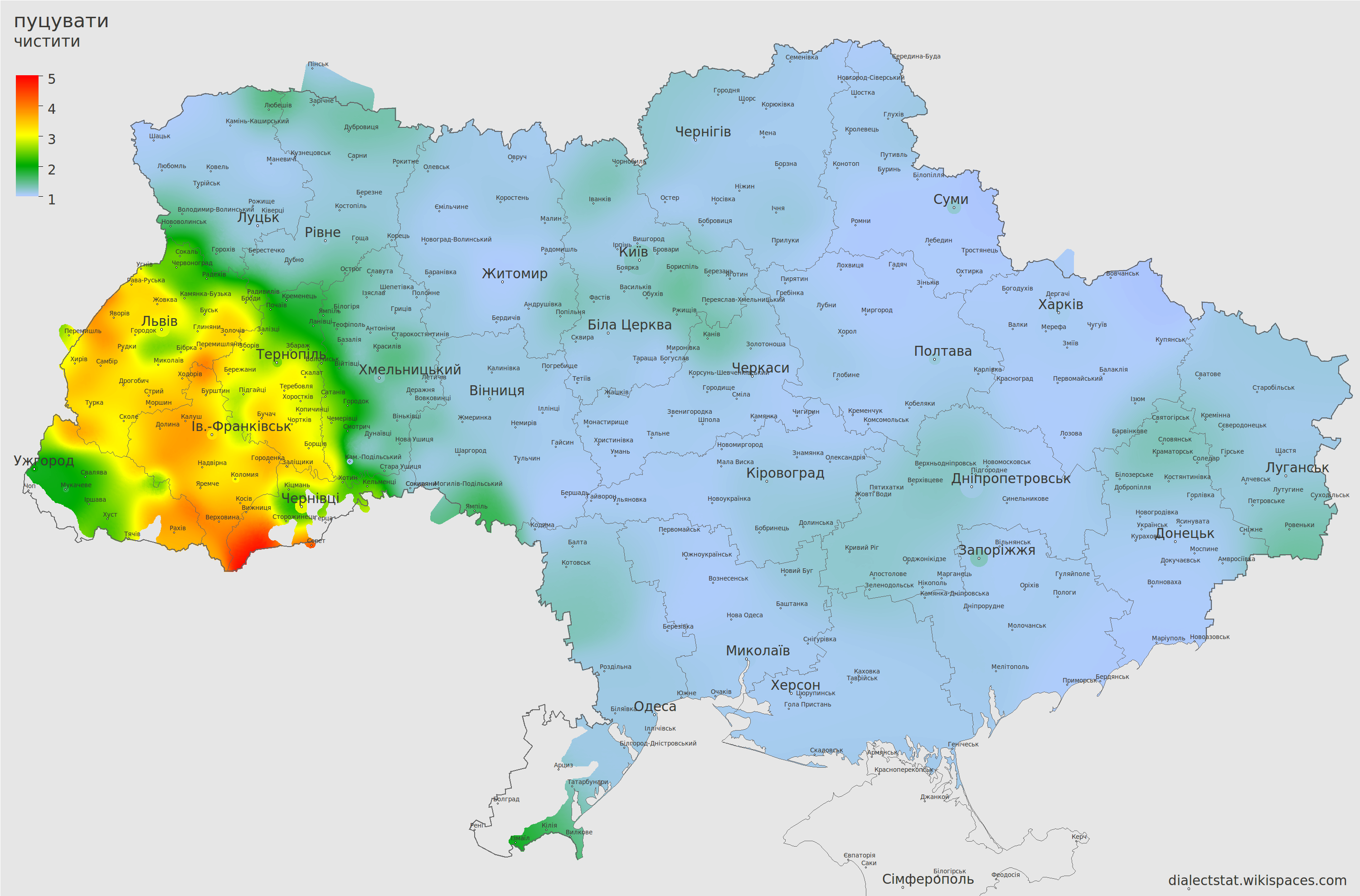
Usage of the word пуцувати (putsuvaty)

During the period of Austrian rule inhabitants of Galicia and neighbouring Bukovyna adopted numerous German words, many of which are now seen as archaisms. Some words, which are characteristic of the Dniestrian dialect and differ from standard Ukrainian are:

Dniestrian Ukrainian	Standard Ukrainian	English
баняк (banyak)	каструля (kastrulya)	sauce pan
бульба (bulba)	картопля (kartoplya)	potato
бузьок (buzyok)	лелека (leleka)	stork
видіти (vydity)	бачити (bachyty)	to see (compare Polish widzieć)
дека (deka)	ковдра (kovdra)	blanket (from German Decke)
довбач (dovbach), довбак (dovbak)	дятел (dyatel)	woodpecker
кавалок (kavalok)	кусок (kusok), шматок (shmatok)	piece (from Polish kawałek)
кнайпа (knaypa)	корчма (korchma)	bar, inn (from German Kneipe)
кугут (kuhut)	півень (piven)	rooster
машінґвер (mashingver)	кулемет (kulemet)	machine gun (from German Maschinengewehr)
писок (pysok)	рот (rot)	mouth
пуцувати (putsuvaty)	чистити (chystyty)	to clean (from German Putzen)
рура (rura)	труба (truba)	pipe (from German Rohr)
твар (tvar)	обличчя (oblychchya)	face
файний (fajnyj)	гарний (harnyj)	lovely, nice (from Polish fajny)
фіранка (firanka)	завіска (zaviska)	curtain (from German Vorhang)
цера (tsera)	шкіра (shkira)	skin

== Subdialects ==
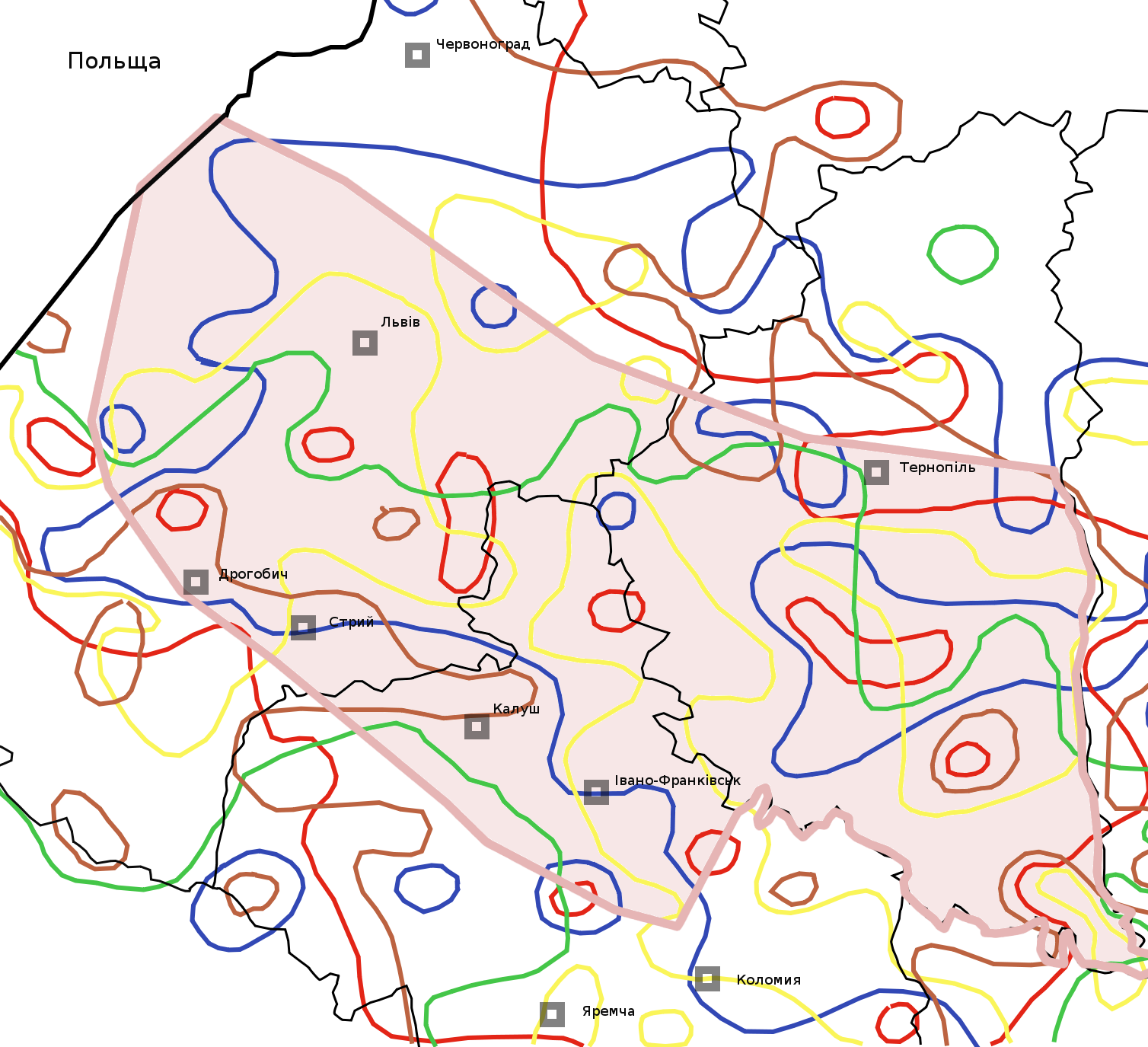
Area and main isoglosses of Dniestrian dialect

The so-called Batiuk group of subdialects, which is spoken to the southwest of Lviv, is transitional to Sian dialect. They are characterized by the transitions [e]>[ɪ],[i], [o]>[u] in unstressed positions.

The group of varieties spoken south of the Dniester is transitional to Pokutian dialects and is characterized by palatalization of coronal consonants before [i]<[o]; transitions [sʲtʲ]>[sʲc], presence of palatalized [r], future forms of verbs with infinitive (буду ходити), noun endings конéви, -нéм, землéў, but на кони́, пóли, зимли́, differences in stress rules and lexicon.

Northeastern varieties have many common features with Volhynian dialect, such as non-palatalized [r], use of prothetic [ɦ] instead of [w], [j] (горáти, ги́ндик).

== See also ==
- Naddnistrianshchyna
