= Răcăria =

- Commune
- Location within Moldova
- Coordinates: 47°54′06″N 27°36′59″E
- Country: Moldova
- District: Rîșcani District

Government
  - Mayor: Valentina Nadulișneac

Population (2014)
  - Total: 1,603
- Time zone: UTC+2 (EET)
  - Summer (DST): UTC+3 (EEST)

Răcăria is a commune in Rîșcani District, Moldova. It is composed of two villages, Răcăria and Ușurei.

== Population ==
According to data from the 2014 census, the commune has a population of 1,603 inhabitants. Of these, 1258 (78.5%) were Ukrainians, 260 (16.2%) Moldovans and 78 (4.9%) Russians.

At the 2004 census, there were 1,883 inhabitants. 458 in Ușurei and 1425 in Răcăria.

== Climate ==
Răcăria experiences a temperate-continental climate with an average annual temperature of 10 °C (50 °F). The average temperature in July is 20 °C (68 °F), while in January it is around −5 °C (23 °F). The region receives annual rainfall ranging from 400 to 550 mm. Summers are warm and winters are freezing, snowy, and windy. Temperature variations are typical of the northern Moldovan climate, typically varying from 22°F to 81°F (-6°C to 27°C) and rarely dropping below 6°F (-14°C) or exceeding 90°F (32°C).

== Răcăria village ==
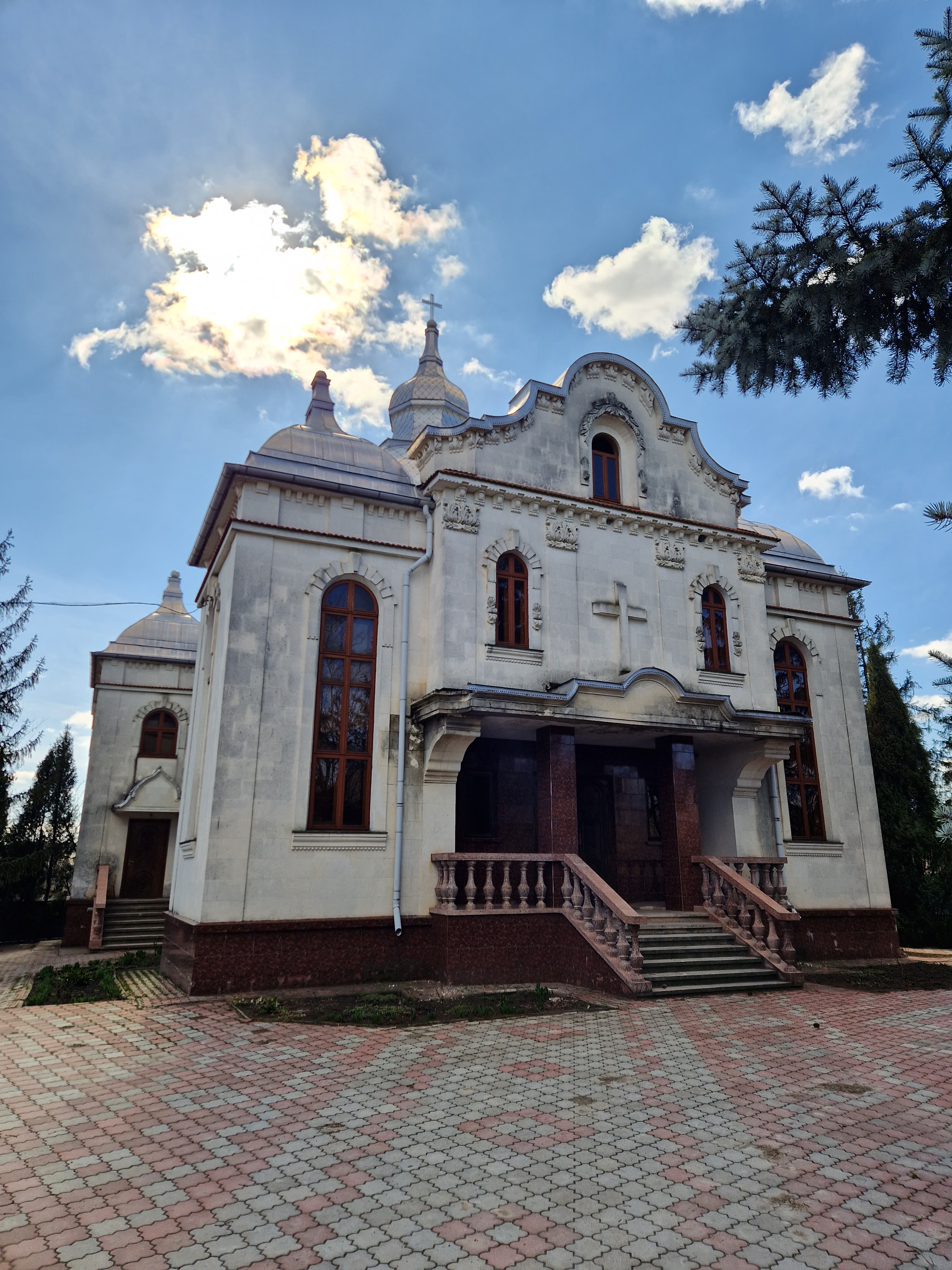
Baptist church

=== History ===
The first documented mention of Răcăria village dates to 1823.

=== Demographics ===
The ethnic composition of the village, according to the 2004 population census:

Ethnic Group	Population	Percentage
Ukrainians	1,155	81.05%
Moldovans / Romanians	245	17.19%
Russians	21	1.47%
Bulgarians	1	0.07%
Gagauz	1	0.07%
Others	2	0.14%
Total	1,425	100%

== Ușurei ==
Ușurei village was founded in 1925.

According to the 2004 census, it had 458 inhabitants, of whom 402 (87.8%) were Ukrainians, 31 (6.8%) Moldovans and 21 (4.6%) Russians.

== Bibliography ==
- Constantin Manolache et al., Basarabia în date: 1812-1918, vol. 3: Localități și lăcașuri sfinte. Chișinău: Editura USM, 2024, ISBN 978-9975-62-832-7
