= Upper Sannian dialect =

Dialect of the Ukrainian language

- Надсянський говір
- Region: Sian Lowland
- Language family: Indo-European: Slavic; East Slavic; Ukrainian; Southwestern Ukrainian; Galician–Bukovinian; Upper Sannian dialect

Language codes
- ISO 639-3: –
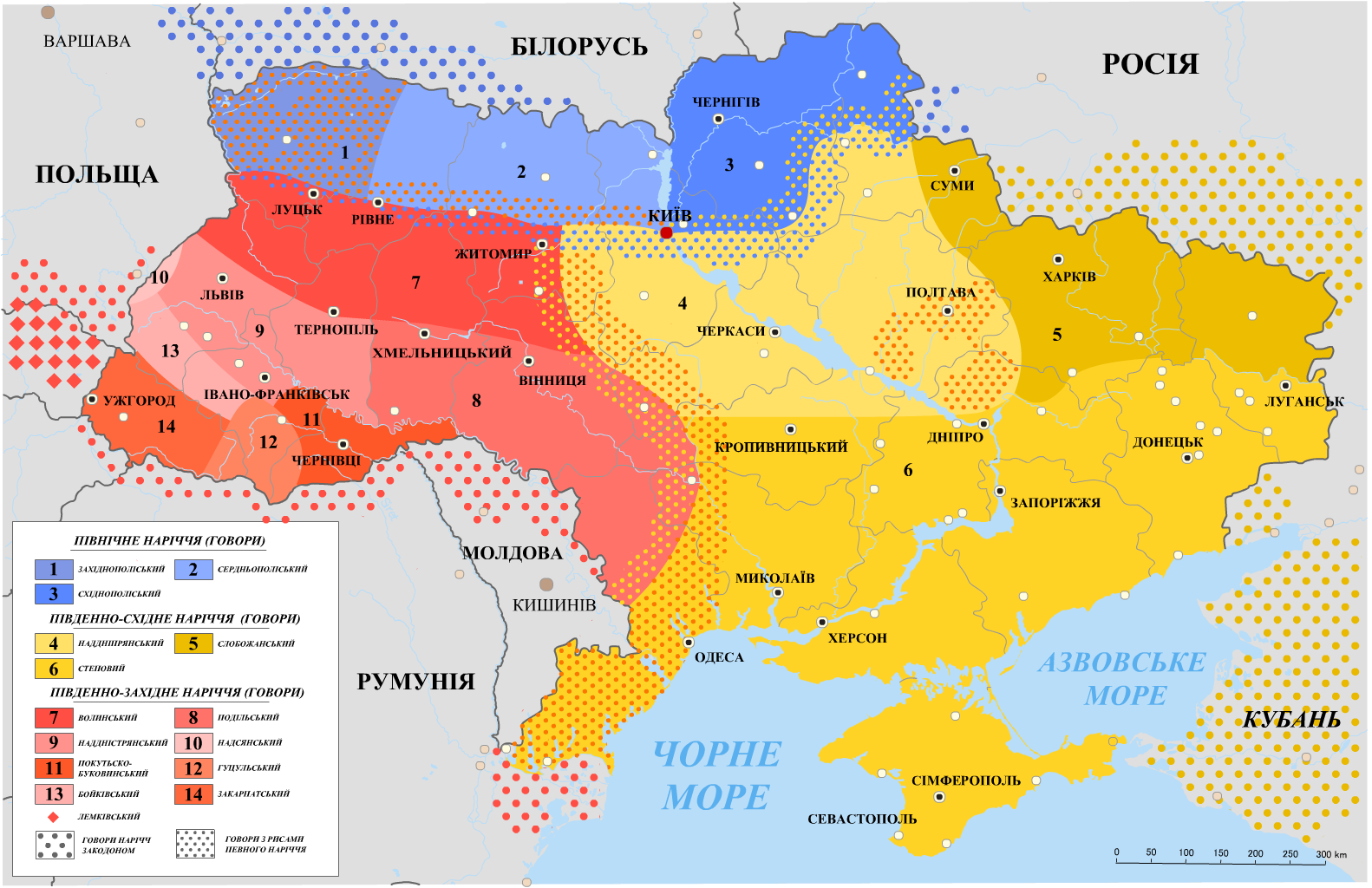
- Upper Sannian (10)

The Upper Sannian dialect (Ukrainian: Надсянський говір, romanized: Nadsianskyi hovir) is one of the dialects of the Ukrainian language, spoken in the Sian Lowland along the border with Poland. Historically spoken well within Poland, most of its speakers were deported to the Soviet Union as part of Operation Vistula. The dialect is part of the Intangible Cultural Heritage of Ukraine since 23 December 2022. It is part of the Galician–Bukovinian dialect group of the Southwestern Ukrainian dialects.

== Geography ==
The Upper Sannian dialect is among the most archaic dialects of Ukrainian, and is influenced by several influences from Polish, Czech, Romanian, and Hungarian, owing to its location. Prior to Operation Vistula, the dialect's borders were the Strviazh and the village of Halychany. Since Operation Vistula, many of its features have been lost. It may still be spoken as far south as Dobromyl.

== Main features ==
Among the primary features of the Upper Sannian dialect is the practice of ukannye, in which /ɔ/ is commonly pronounced as /u/ (рубóта, сукíра). The dialect preserves a "narrowed" [i] (дітіна) and the phoneme [ɨ]. Other notable differences from standard Ukrainian include the pronunciation of В as /ɦ/ instead of /v/, Е as /a/ instead of /ɛ/ (вачір), and Ф as /x/ instead of /f/, among others. The pronunciation of [a] after palatalized consonants is closer to [e] (дьекую, пйеть).

== In literature ==
One notable writer in the Upper Sannian dialect was poet Osyp Makovei, and his works have been preserved in the village of Malniv, where efforts are underway to maintain the dialect.
