= Chłopomania =

Populist movement of Right-Bank Ukraine

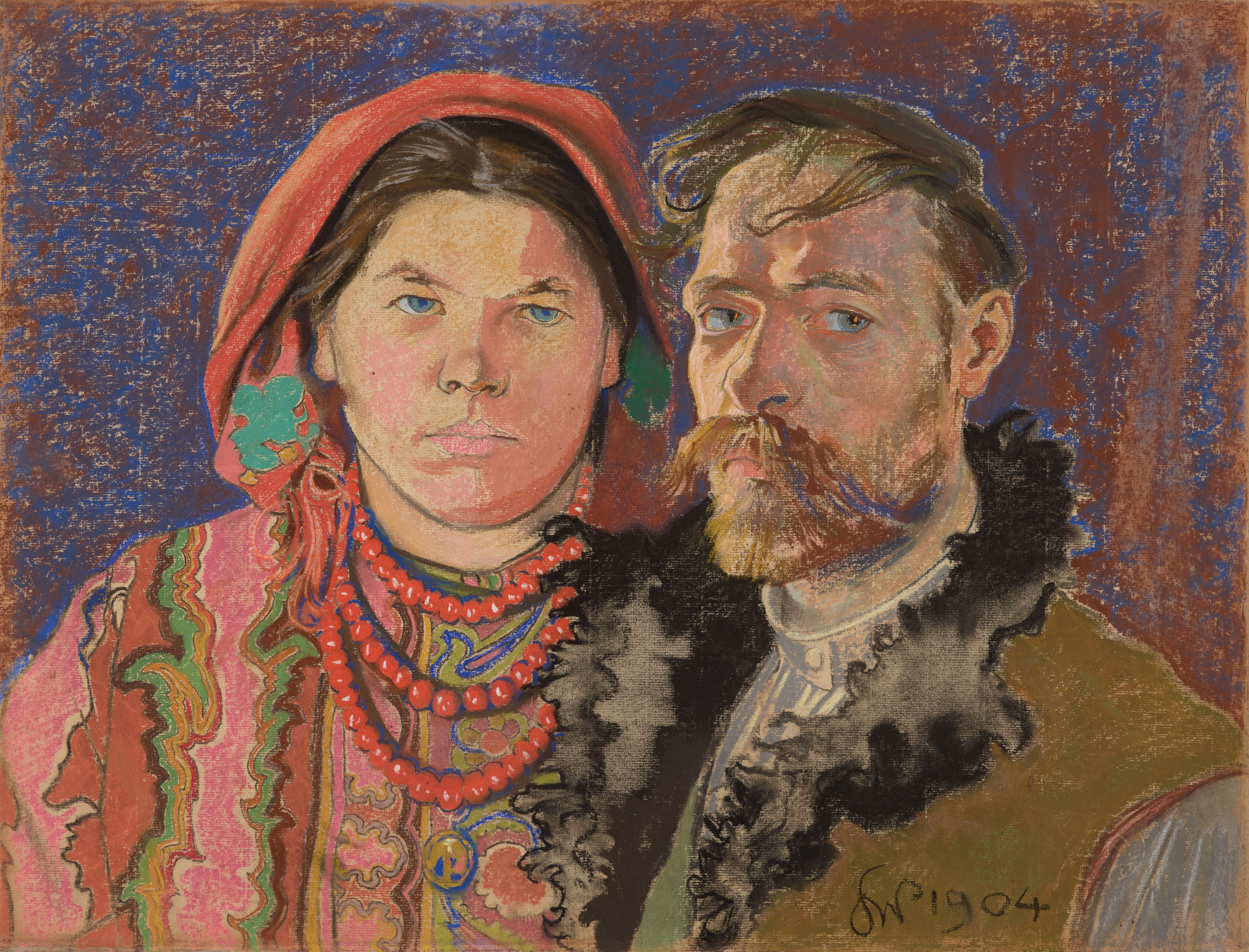
Painter and playwright Stanisław Wyspiański, self-portrait with peasant wife Teofilia Pytko, 1904

Chłopomania (Polish: [xwɔpɔˈmaɲa]) or Khlopomanstvo (Ukrainian: Хлопоманство [xlopoˈmɑnstwo]) are historical and literary terms inspired by the Young Poland modernist movement and the Ukrainian Hromady. The expressions refer to the intelligentsia's fascination with, and interest in, the peasantry in late-19th-century Galicia and right-bank Ukraine.

Though originally used in jest, with time the renewed interest in folk traditions influenced the national revivals in Poland and Ukraine, both ruled by foreign empires. "Peasant-mania", a manifestation of both neo-romanticism and populism, arose during Galicia's rule by Austria-Hungary and touched both Poles and Ukrainians. It also manifested itself in the Russian Empire in forms of Narodniks, where it strongly contributed to the shaping of modern Ukrainian culture. Chłopomania also contributed to formation of Hromadas (communities of Ukrainian intelligentsia).

== Etymology ==
The terms literally mean "peasant-mania", being portmanteaus of Slavic chłop / xлоп, which stands for 'peasant', and Hellenic -mania, in the senses of 'enthusiasm' or 'craze'.

== History ==
The political situation of the region led many intellectuals (Poles and Ukrainians) to believe that the only alternative to decadence is getting back to the folk roots: moving out of large cities and mixing with "simple men". Focusing on chłopomania within Polish culture, Romanian literary historian Constantin Geambaşu argues: "Initially, the Cracovian bohemians' interest in the village followed purely artistic goals. Preoccupied with the idea of national freedom, the democratic Polish intellectuals were made aware of the necessity to attract and enlist the peasantry's potential in view of [Poland's] independence movement. The notion of social solidarity is formed and consolidated as a solution to overcome the impasse faced by Polish society, especially given the failure of the January 1863 insurrection."

Chłopomania spread into Carpathian Ruthenia and the Russian Empire, touching the westernmost parts of Ukraine (Right-bank Ukraine, Podolia etc.). This section of the movement merged into the larger Ukrainophile current, which brought together partisans and sympathizers of Ukrainian nationalism irrespective of cultural or ethnic background. Russian scholar Aleksei I. Miller defines the social makeup of some chłopomania groups (whose members are known as chłopomani or khlopomany) in terms of reversed acculturation: "Khlopomany were young people from Polish or traditionally Polonized families who, due to their populist convictions, rejected social and cultural belonging to their stratum and strove to approach the local peasantry." Similarly, Canadian researcher John-Paul Himka describes the Ukrainian chłopomani as "primarily Poles of Right Bank Ukraine", noting that their contribution was in line with a tradition of "Ukrainophile" cooperation against the Russians and the Russophiles. In reference to the cultural crossover between the two ethnic versions of chłopomania, French historian Daniel Beauvois noted that "in certain numbers", chłopomani from within the Polish gentry contributed to "reinforcing the Ukrainian movement". Miller however focuses on the movement's role in exacerbating tensions between Ukrainians, Poles and the Russian administrators. He writes: "The government could not but rejoice at the fact that some khlopomany renounced their Catholic faith, converted to Orthodoxy, and refused to support the Polish national movement. However, the Polish ill-wishers were quick to draw the government's attention to the subversive flavor of the khlopomany's social views and their pro-Ukrainophile orientation. The authorities were more often than not inclined to pay heed to these accusations, being guided more by the instinct of social solidarity with Polish landowners than by the strategy of national confrontation with the Poles."

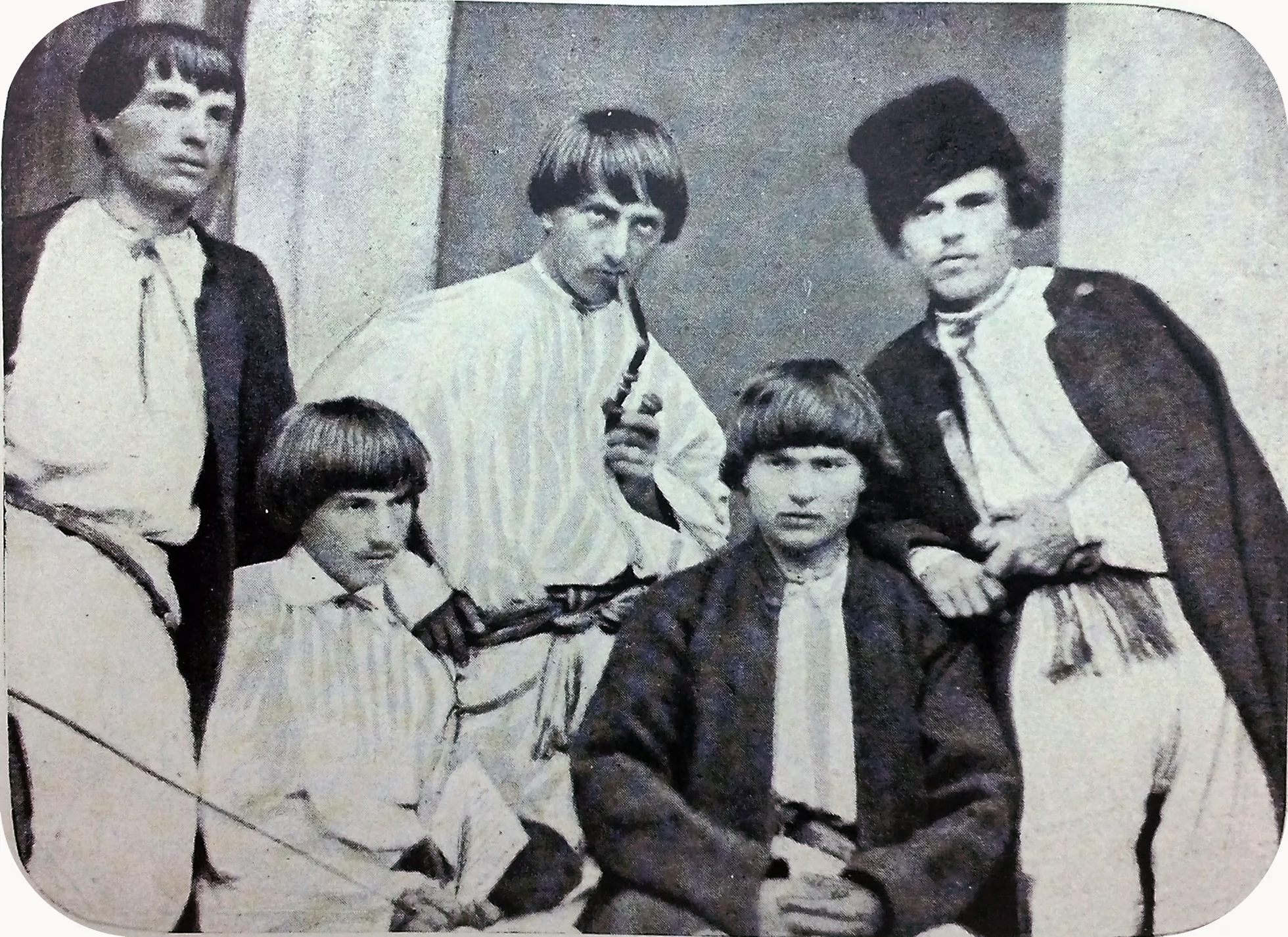
Volodymyr Antonovych (sitting on the right) with a group of fellow khlopomany, c. 1860

According to Himka, the earliest chłopomani, active in the early 1860s, included Paulin Święcicki, who dedicated much of his career to advancing the Ukrainian cause. Among the best-known representatives of this circle of intellectuals are Stanisław Wyspiański (whose The Wedding is occasionally associated with chłopomania as its standard manifesto). In 1900 Wyspiański married the mother of his four children Teodora Pytko from a village near Kraków. In November of the same year he participated in the peasant wedding of his friend, poet Lucjan Rydel in Bronowice. Other prominent figures include intellectuals associated with the Ukrainian magazine Osnova, primarily Volodymyr Antonovych and Tadei Rylsky, as well as poet Pavlo Chubynsky.

Scholars have noted links between chłopomania and currents emerging in regions neighboring Galicia, both inside and outside Austria-Hungary. Literary historian John Neubauer described it as part of late 19th century "populist strains" in the literature of East-Central Europe, in close connection to the agrarianist Głos magazine (published in Congress Poland) and with the ideas of Estonian cultural activists Jaan Tõnisson and Villem Reiman. Neubauer also traces the inspiration of chłopomania to Władysław Reymont and his Nobel-winning Chłopi novel, as well as seeing it manifested in the work of Young Poland authors such as Jan Kasprowicz. According to Beauvois, the participation of various Poles in the Ukrainian branch of the movement was later echoed in the actions of Stanisław Stempowski, who, although a Pole, invested in improving the living standard of Ukrainian peasants in Podolia. Miller also notes that the movement had echoes in areas of the Russian Empire other than Congress Poland and Ukraine, highlighting one parallel, "albeit of a much lesser dimension", in what later became Belarus. The notion of chłopomania was specifically linked by Geambaşu with the Sămănătorist and Poporanist currents cultivated by ethnic Romanian intellectuals from the Kingdom of Romania and Transylvania.

== See also ==
- Ukrainophilia
