= Teofil Kostruba =

Ukrainian historian, theologian, literary critic (1907–1943)

- Теофіль Коструба
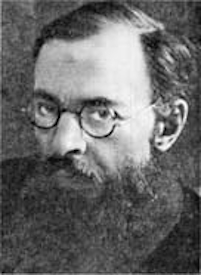
- Born: Teofil Petrovych Kostruba; 26 May 1907; Stara Yahilnytsia, Austria-Hungary (now Ukraine)
- Died: 3 March 1943 (aged 35); Lviv
- Education: Lviv University
- Occupations: Historian, theologian, literary critic

Teofil Petrovych Kostruba (Ukrainian: Теофіль Петрович Коструба, 26 May 1907 – 3 March 1943) was a Ukrainian historian, theologian, literary critic.

== Biography ==
Teofil Kostruba was born on 26 May 1907 in Stara Yahilnytsia, now Nahirianka rural hromada of the Chortkiv Raion of the Ternopil Oblast in Ukraine. He was the brother of Petro Kostruba.

Due to a serious illness, he was forced to leave his studies at the Chortkiv Gymnasium, but during 1924–1928 Kostruba was engaged in self-education and was active in public life. In 1930, he took the matriculation exams at the Academic Gymnasium in Lviv as an external student. In 1939, he graduated from the Philosophical and Theological Faculty of Lviv University (Kostruba's master's thesis was dedicated to the charters of Prince Lev).

He was a member of the historical and source studies and old and new Ukrainian history commissions of the Shevchenko Scientific Society. In 1936–1937, on his initiative, an unofficial seminar on the history of Ukraine was held for Ukrainian students at Lviv University.

In 1940, Metropolitan Andrei Sheptytskyi secretly ordained Kostruba a priest, who from then on lived in the monastery of St. Onufriy in Lviv. Before his death, Kostruba took monastic vows under the name Teodosii. He died on 3 March 1943 in Lviv, where he was buried at the Lychakiv Cemetery.

== Works ==
Kostrubi's knowledge of 11 languages allowed him to translate into modern Ukrainian a considerable number of ancient historical sources, including: the description of Scythia found in Herodotus, "Galician–Volhynian Chronicle", "Primary Chronicle" (several of his works have been published). In 1938, he compiled a handy bibliography of Ukrainian history. At the same time, Kostruba collaborated with the editors of Catholic publications, including the magazines "Postup" and "Khliborobskyi Shliakh" and the newspaper "Nova Zoria", as well as co-publisher of the almanac "Za Velych Natsii", editor of several issues of "Literaturna Skarbnytsia", "Dobra Knyzhka" (Lviv), and "Ukrainska Knyzhka" (Zhovkva).

Main monographs:

- Materiialy do istorii m. Chortkova (1929),
- Hetman Ivan Skoropadskyi (1708–1722) (1932);
- Volodymyr Velykyi – budivnychyi ukrainskoi derzhavy (1937);
- Pravoslavne dukhovenstvo (1937);
- Uniia y pravoslavia v ukrainskii istorii I pol. ХІХ st. (1937);
- Istoriia Ukrainy. Kn. 1–4 (1938);
- Naidavnisha zghadka pro Boikivshchynu (Z pochatku ХІ stolittia). (1938);
- Nashi muchenyky za Uniiu (Yak Moskovshchyna nyshchyla Uniiu) (1938);
- Narysy z tserkovnoi istorii Ukrainy Х–ХІІ st. (1939, 1955);
- Vira nashykh predkiv (1946);
- Narys istorii Ukrainy (1961);
- Yak Moskva nyshchyla ukrainsku tserkvu (1961).
