= Yulian Nazarak =

Ukrainian soldier, poet, painter (1893–1916)

- Юліан Назарак
- Born: 1893; Cherkavshchyna, Austria-Hungary (now Ukraine)
- Died: 16 September 1916 (aged 22–23); Volyn

Yulian Nazarak (Ukrainian: Юліан Назарак; 1893 – 16 September 1916) was a Ukrainian soldier (desiatnyk, khorunzhyi), poet, painter.

== Biography ==
Yulian Nazarak was born in 1893 in Cherkavshchyna, now Nahirianka rural hromada, Chortkiv Raion, Ternopil Oblast, Ukraine.

He studied at the Lviv Academic Gymnasium. From 1911 he periodically studied at the Kraków Academy of Arts, but did not graduate.

At the beginning of World War I, he joined the ranks of the Ukrainian Sich Riflemen. He was one of the organizers and a member of the "Presova kvartyra". In the spring of 1915, during the Battle of Makivka, he was wounded.

He was active in the "Artystychna horstka" riflemen's art society and also played in an amateur theater.

He died on 16 September 1916 at the front (Volyn).

== Works ==
Author of the libretto for the one-act comic opera "Shturm na polukipky" (1915, music by Mykhailo Haivoronskyi), to which he wrote the rifle songs "Khloptsi, aliarm!", "Slava, slava, otamane!", "Nema v sviti krashchykh khloptsiv" (published in collections of arrangements of rifle songs by B. Vakhnianyn, B. Kudryk, Z. Lysko, Y. Yaroslavenko, and others).

=== Creativity ===
In 1909, he began painting oil paintings (which were exhibited in the Lviv store of the "Dostava" Union), portraits, figurative compositions, and landscapes.

Main works: "Prometei", "M. Kotsiubynskyi", "Barabannyi vohon artylerii pid Semykivtsiamy" and "Bii pid Rakovtsem" (both 1916; the former is kept in the National Museum of Lviv, and the latter is now destroyed; it was also kept in the same institution until 1952; exhibited in Vienna (1906), Lviv (1916, 1934); recognized by art critics as the first expressionist works of Ukrainian Galician painting).

In 1915, a portrait of Nazarak was painted by Yulian Butsmaniuk.

== Honoring ==
On 24 August 2014, a monument to Nazarak was unveiled in his native village.
