= Ulashkivtsi Monastery =

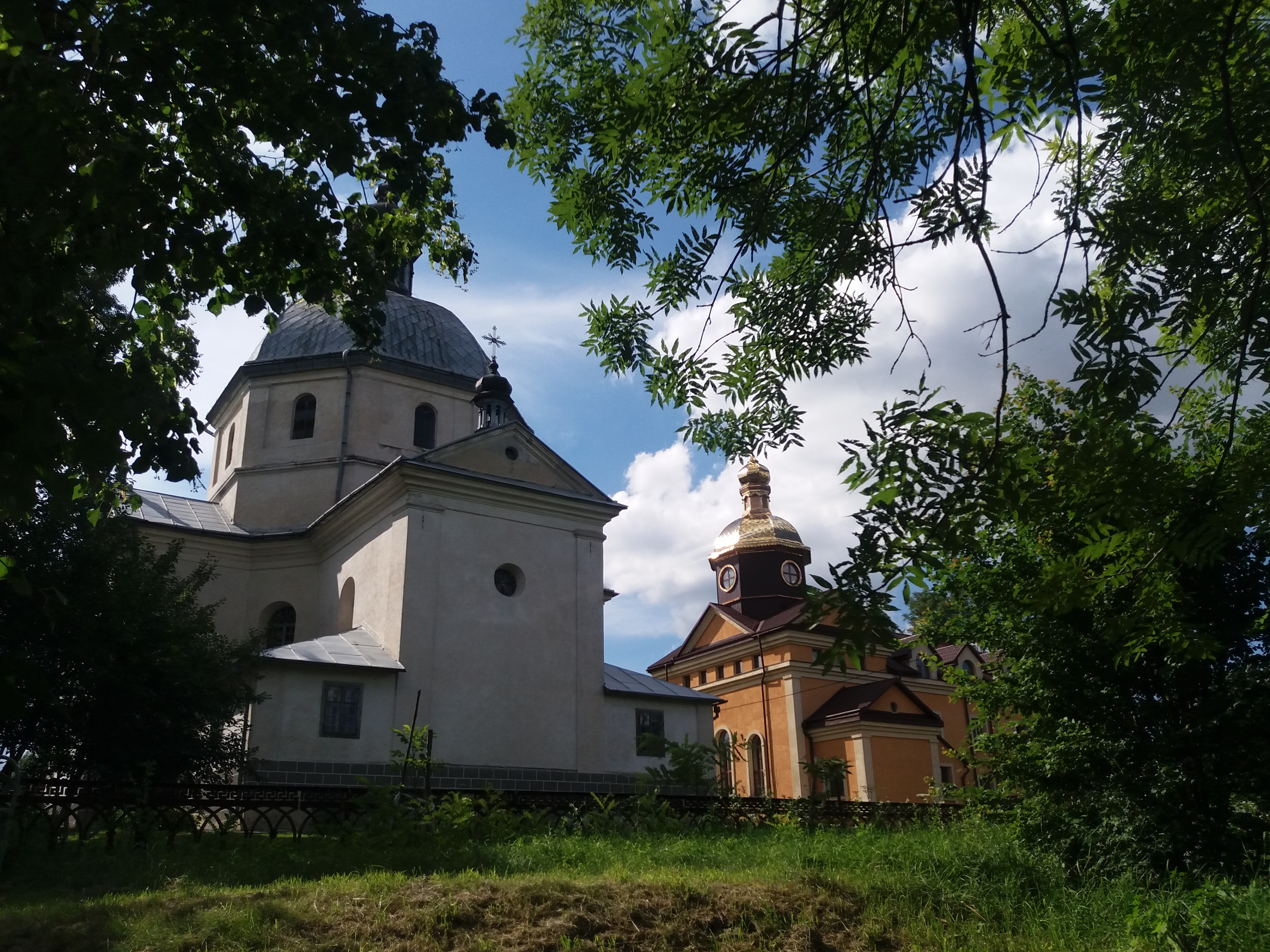
Church of St. John and Monastery of the Nativity of the Virgin Mary of the Order of St. Basil the Great

The Monastery of the Nativity of the Virgin Mary (Ukrainian: Улашківський монастир) of the Order of St. Basil the Great is a parish and church of the Greek Catholic Church of the Buchach Diocese of the Ukrainian Greek Catholic Church in Ulashkivtsi in Chortkiv Raion, Ternopil Oblast.

The church and bell tower of the monastery have been declared architectural monuments of local significance (protection numbers 1755/1, 1755/2).

== History ==
According to legend, monks who arrived in the Zvyniach in 1240 settled in the Ulaskivtsi caves in 1315, where they continued their monastic life. The monastery operated from the 14th century until 1946, after which it resumed its work in 1990. From the 18th century, it has belonged to the Ukrainian Greek Catholic Church.

In 1738, the monastery buildings were constructed, and in 1856, the monastery church was built according to the design of Adalbert Gaaar. In 1739, the monastery was joined to the Order of St. Basil the Great. In 1765, the Raciborski family donated a miraculous icon of the Blessed Virgin Mary, modeled after the Belz (Częstochowa) Virgin Mary, to the church.

In 1946, the Soviet authorities closed the monastery and sent the monks into exile. During the Soviet period, the church was used as a warehouse, and the monastery as a dormitory and club. In 1990, the monastery resumed its activities.

Between 1995 and 2002, the monastery served the parish of the village of Mylivtsi and the hamlet of Zhmykiv. In 2008, construction began on a new building for the monastery.

The temple houses miraculous icons of the Holy Virgin of Ulaskivtsi and John the Baptist. It also contains the relics of John the Baptist, the holy martyr Yosafat Kuntsevych, and fragments of the Life-Giving Cross of the Lord.

The monastery and its parish have the status of a place of pilgrimage. The parish has a brotherhood, a sisterhood, and an Altar Guild. The monastery owns buildings, a church, a bell tower, the ruins of an ancient cave monastery, and farm buildings. The Way of the Cross has been set up on the parish grounds.

== Hegumens ==
- Vitalii Brylynskyi (1740 taken to Russia)
- Pakhomii Nehrebetskyi
- Yosafat Lozynskyi
- Viktor Yarembkovskyi
- Lev Podsonskyi
- Ilarion Lontovskyi
- Onufrii Kryzhanovskyi (†24.03.1793)
- Makarii Tatarkevych (†20.03.1826 in Ulashkivtsi)
- Avksentii Kulynych
- Inokentii Kundrat
- Pavlo Drevnytskyi
- Ihnatii Nahurskyi (†3.10.1866 in Ulashkivtsi)
- Samuil Charnorutskyi
- Izydor Korzhynskyi
- Amvrozii Tarchanyn
- Leontii Osmiliovskyi
- Yuliian Telishevskyi (†10.01.1883 in Ulashkivtsi)
- Modest Bushchak (†9.03.1896 in Ulashkivtsi)
- Myron Khmilevskyi
- Markiian Shkirpan
- Arkadii Murii
- Jeremiah Lomnytskyj
- Myron Khmilevskyi
- Yosyf Pelenskyi
- Makarii Karovets
- Yevstakhii Turkovyd
- Pasyv Kisil
- Vartolomei Seniuta
- Vissarion Fidyk
- Sylvestr Zhuravetskyi
- Yeromin Halabarda
- Yuliian Datsii
- Veniamyn Rozhin
- Pankratii Savytskyi
- Pavlo Olinskyi
- Andrii Yavdoshchak (1990—1991)
- Teodosii Kretsul (1991—2016)
- Vlasii Futs (2016—2024)
- Ivan Petryshak (from 2024)

== See also ==
- Grotto of Saint Onuphrius, Ulashkivtsi
