= Zygmunt Haupt =

Polish writer and painter

- Born: March 5, 1907; Ułaszkowce, Galicia
- Died: May 10, 1975 (aged 68); Winchester, Virginia, United States
- Occupation: Writer
- Writing career
- Notable work: Pierścień z papieru

Zygmunt Haupt (5 March 1907 – 10 May 1975) was a Polish writer and painter.

== Biography ==
He was born in Ułaszkowce, Podole. His father Ludwik was a school inspector and his mother was a teacher. Initially he attended a school in Tarnopol. In 1925 he graduated from Kopernik gymnasium (high school) in Lwów and later studied engineering and architecture at the Lwów Politechnic. After the death of his father in 1928, he went to Paris, where he studied urban studies in 1931-1932 at Sorbonne. He started to write and paint there. After return to Lwów he became active in local cultural life.

In 1939 he was mobilized into the army and fought during the Invasion of Poland in the 10th Brigade of Motorized Cavalry of colonel Stanisław Maczek. After the Soviet invasion of Poland Haupt fled to Hungary and later to France. He survived the siege of Dunkirk and was evacuated to England. He served in the Polish army until 1946.

At the end of the war, Haupt married American Edith Norris from New Orleans, whom he met in Great Britain. They married in London and later moved to New Orleans, New York and Washington, settling in Virginia, where he lived the rest of his life. For three decades he contributed stories, articles, and memoirs in Polish to several periodicals, including the Paris-based emigre journal Kultura.

Awards that he received were Kultura's 1962 prize for literature, and the 1971 award of the Koscielski Foundation of Geneva for his contributions to Polish literature.

During his lifetime, Haupt published only one book, Pierścień z papieru (Paper Ring) in 1963 in Paris. After suffering a heart attack, Haupt died 10 May 1975 in the hospital in Winchester, Virginia. He was buried in New Orleans.

== Works ==
- Pierścień z papieru (1963) - short story collection
- Szpica. Opowiadania, warianty, szkice (1989) - short story collection
- Baskijski diabeł (2007) - large collection of short stories and reports
- Z Roksolanii (2009) - collection of early writings, journalism, drawings
