= Dolyna, Chortkiv Raion =

Rural locality in Ternopil Oblast, Ukraine

Dolyna Долина
- Location in Ternopil Oblast
- Coordinates: 48°56′43″N 25°43′8″E
- Country: Ukraine
- Oblast: Ternopil Oblast
- Raion: Chortkiv Raion
- Hromada: Nahirianka Hromada
- Established: 16th century
- Time zone: UTC+2 (EET)
  - Summer (DST): UTC+3 (EEST)
- Postal code: 48509

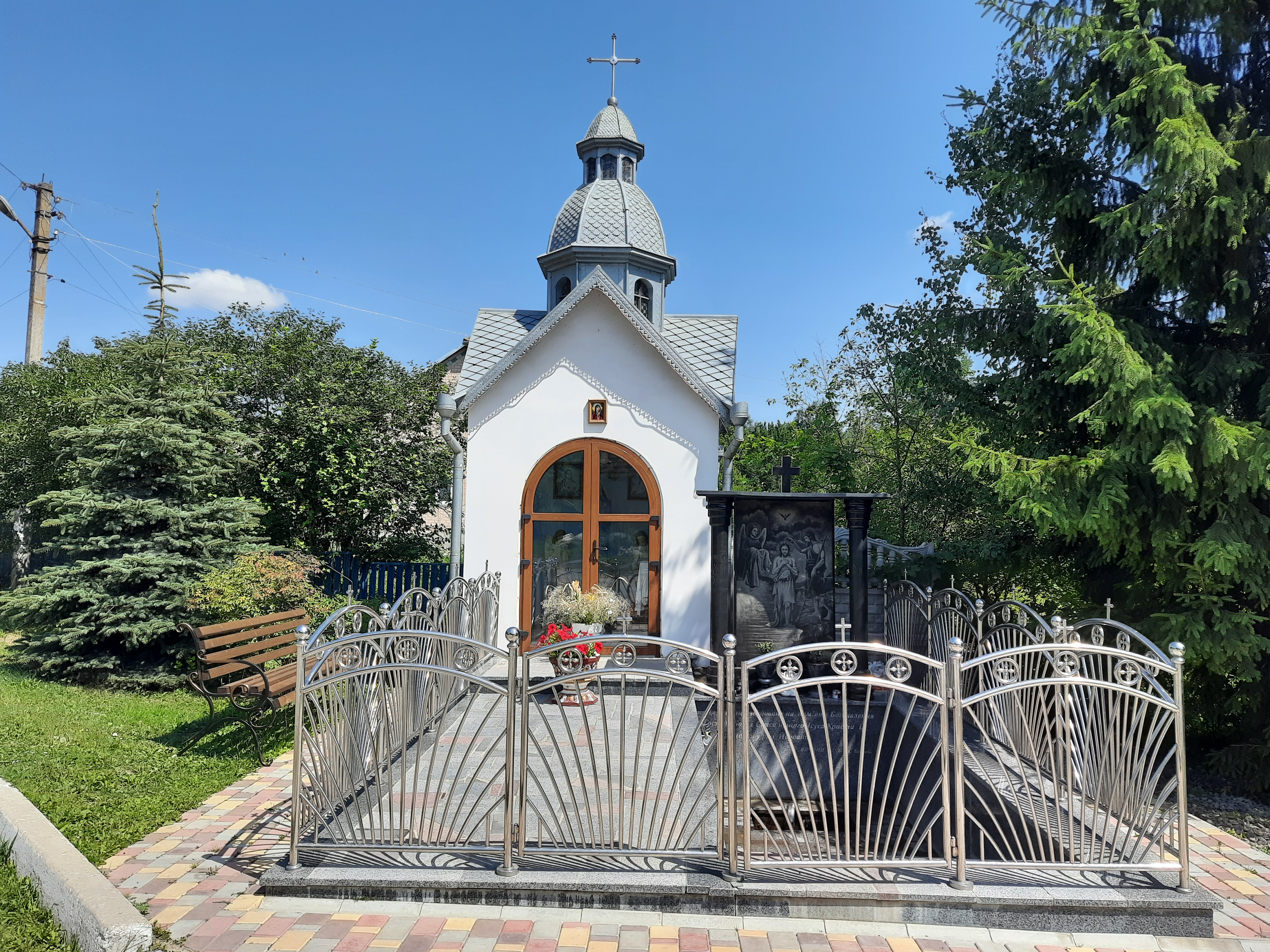
Chapel in the village of Dolyna Chortkiv district, Ternopil region

Dolyna (Ukrainian: Долина) is a village in Ukraine, Ternopil Oblast, Chortkiv Raion, Nahirianka rural hromada. In 1961–1991, the village belonged to Shulhanivka.

== History ==
The village has been attested to since at least the mid-16th century.

== Religion ==
There are three chapels in the village, including one of the Mother of God (founded by Liubomyr Khrustavka and his family, 2012).
