= Naddnistrianshchyna =

Ethnographic region in Ukraine

Naddnistrianshchyna (Ukrainian: Наддністрянщина), also Podnistrovia, Naddnisteria, Podnistrianshchyna or Podnistria, is a Ukrainian ethnographic region located within several present-day oblasts of western Ukraine (Vinnytsia, Lviv, Ivano-Frankivsk, Ternopil, Khmelnytskyi, Chernivtsi) in the upper and middle reaches and basin of the Dniester River.

In Ukrainian historiography, the geographical term Naddnistrianshchyna is used to refer to the now Ukrainian territories that were part of Austria-Hungary – parts of the Kingdom of Galicia and Lodomeria and of the Duchy of Bukovina.

== See also ==
- Dniestrian Ukrainian dialect
- Dnieper Ukraine
- Grotto of Saint Onuphrius, Ulashkivtsi
