= Paulin Święcicki =

Polish and Ukrainian writer and translator (1841–1876)

Paulin Święcicki (Ukrainian: Павлин Свєнціцький, Pavlyn Svientsitskyi; 1841–1876) was a Polish-Ukrainian writer, journalist, playwright and translator. He was writing under such pseudonyms like "Павло Свій", "Сєльський", "Sorjan", and others. In Kiev he belonged to those who were known as "Polish Rusyns" (Ukrainian: поляко-русинів) and were looking to find a common ground between Ruthenia and Poland.

Active in Austro-Hungarian Galicia, Święcicki was one of key figures in Ukrainian national revival. He is mostly known as a founder and editor-in-chief of a Polish-Ukrainian Sioło monthly. His fascination with Ukrainian folk lore also earned him the title of a precursor of the chłopomania trend in Galician culture of late 19th century.

Born in Varshytsia (today, a neighborhood of Kalynivka) in the Kiev Governorate of the Russian Empire (present-day Vinnytsia Oblast, Ukraine), he was an heir to an old family of lesser szlachta, or Polish landed gentry. He graduated from a prestigious gymnasium at Kamenets-Podolsk and then the St. Vladimir Imperial University (Kiev). An ethnic Pole, early in his youth he became interested in Ukrainian language, culture and folk traditions. Following the crushing of the January Uprising of 1863 he fled from Russian repressions to Austro-Hungarian Kingdom of Galicia and Lodomeria (Galicia, in brevity) and settled in its capital city of Lemberg (modern Lviv, Ukraine). In contrast to the Russian-held part of partitioned Poland, in Galicia neither Polish nor Ukrainian languages were being suppressed or banned. Thanks to that Święcicki could devote himself to extensive studies of Ukrainian language and also became a teacher at one of local Ukrainian colleges.

A fan of Taras Shevchenko's poetry since his student years, Święcicki became one of the first to translate his poems to Polish language. Already in 1864 Święcicki started working for the local Ukrainian Theatre. He wrote numerous Ukrainian-language fables and dramas. He also tried to fill in the cultural gap in Ukrainian culture by translating to that language many foreign screenplays, notably Shakespeare's Hamlet and Józef Korzeniowski's (1797–1863) play Cyganie (Gypsies).

Also in 1864 he founded the Sioło journal. A social, literary and historical magazine, Sioło was published in both Polish and Ukrainian. The journal promoted the idea of Polish-Ukrainian cooperation, promotion of Ukrainian culture and fight for freedom of the Ukrainians (whose culture and language were at that time considered by the tsarist authorities to be Lesser Russian, that is but a sub-group of the Russian nation). The magazine also published also historical documents, notably the Nestor's Chronicle. Although Sioło existed only for four years (until 1867), it was highly influential in promotion of Ukrainian national revival, notably among the intelligentsia of Lwów, at that time one of the major academic centres of Central Europe.

In later years he published three novels in both Polish and Ukrainian versions: Przed laty, Opowieści stepowe and Wspomnienia. According to Serhiy Yefremov, Święcicki's treatise on Ukrainian literature in 19th century is considered to be the first review of modern Ukrainian language literature. However, it were his Ukrainian language fables that earned him his name in contemporary literature.

In 1869 Święcicki became an instructor of Middle Ukrainian (Ruthenian) language in Lviv Academic Gymnasium.

== Publications ==
- Odmiana Zaimkow; Rzecz Jeczykowo-Porownawcza

== See also ==
- Stanisław Stempowski
