= Zabolotivka =

Rural locality in Ternopil Oblast, Ukraine

Zabolotivka Заболотівка
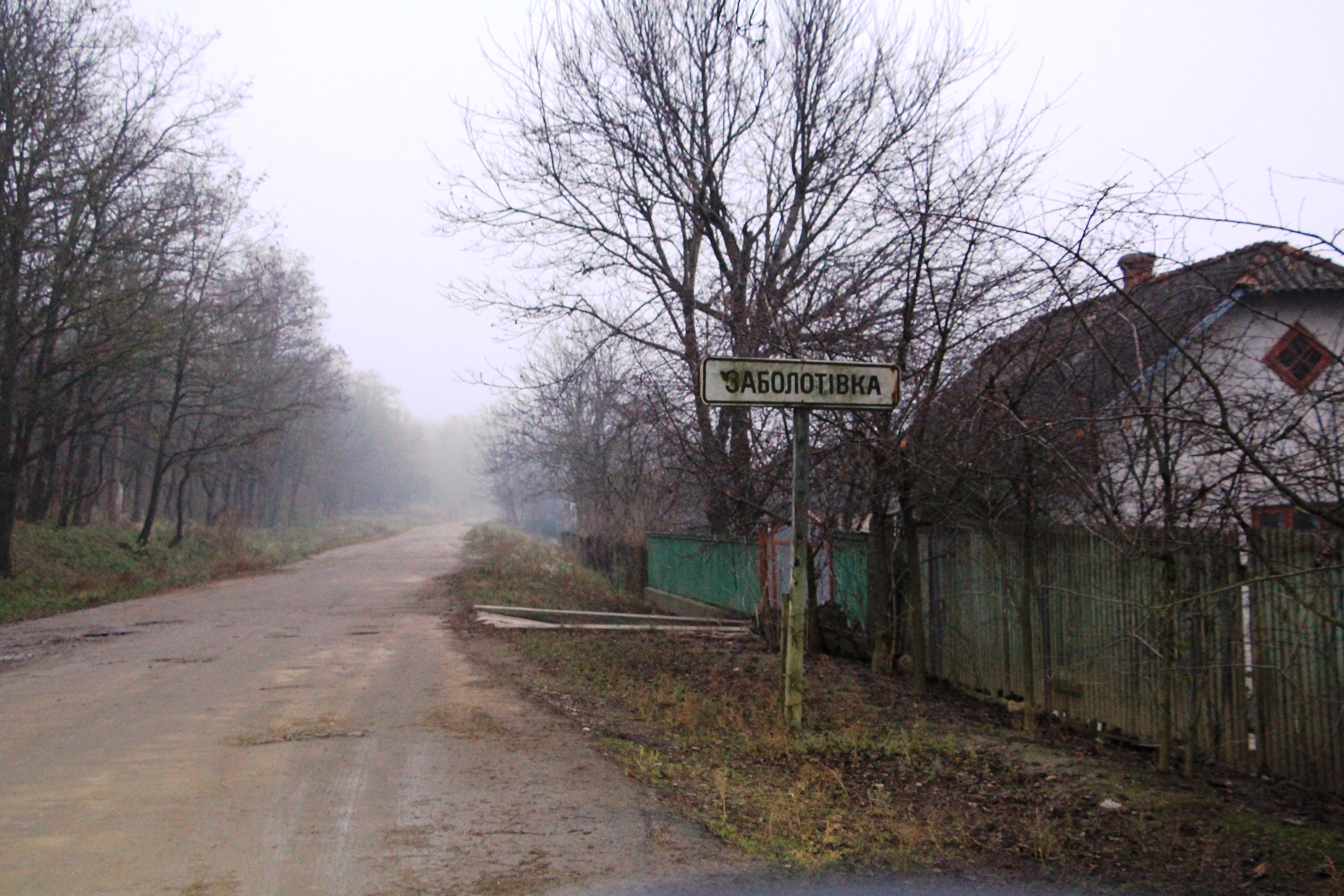

- Location in Ternopil Oblast
- Coordinates: 48°53′11″N 25°50′16″E
- Country: Ukraine
- Oblast: Ternopil Oblast
- Raion: Chortkiv Raion
- Hromada: Nahirianka Hromada
- First mention: 1584
- Time zone: UTC+2 (EET)
  - Summer (DST): UTC+3 (EEST)
- Postal code: 48573

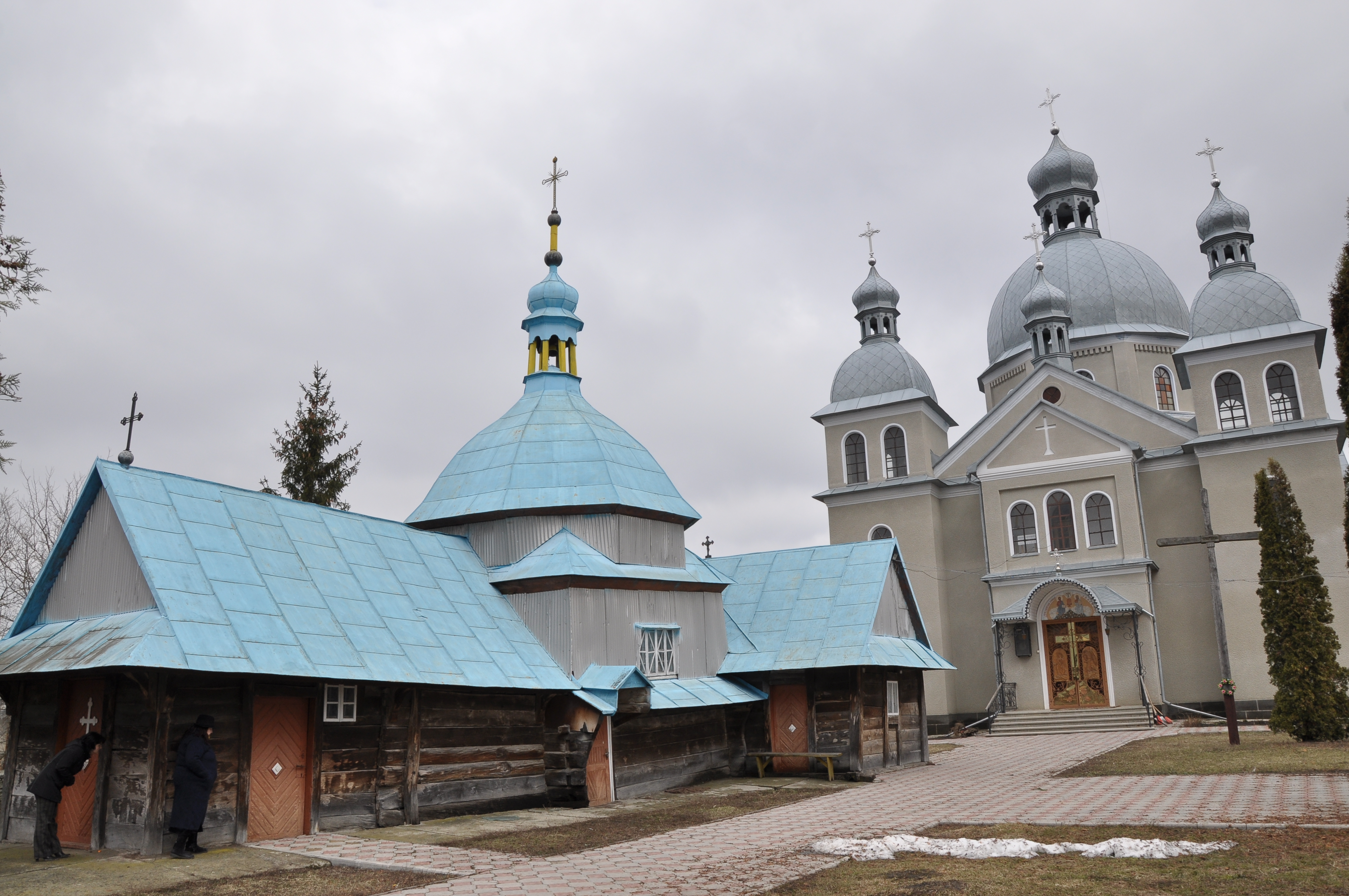
The old and new churches of the Holy Trinity in Zabolotivka

Zabolotivka (Ukrainian: Заболотівка) is a village in Nahirianka rural hromada, Chortkiv Raion, Ternopil Oblast, Ukraine.

== History ==
The first written mention of the village is from 1584.

== Religion ==
- old church (1584, wooden; completed in 1646 and 1674, restored in 1890)
- new Church of the Holy Trinity (1998; architects – the couple Bohdan and Yaroslava Dudiak's; painted by artists Mykhailo and Yurii Nykolaichuk's, Volodymyr Atamanchuk, Volodymyr Nykoliuk, and Oleh Fedoriv)
