= Cherkavshchyna =

Rural locality in Ternopil Oblast, Ukraine

Cherkavshchyna Черкавщина
- Church of the Assumption

- Location in Ternopil Oblast
- Coordinates: 49°0′5″N 25°41′29″E
- Country: Ukraine
- Oblast: Ternopil Oblast
- Raion: Chortkiv Raion
- Hromada: Nahirianka Hromada
- First mentioned: 1453
- Time zone: UTC+2 (EET)
  - Summer (DST): UTC+3 (EEST)
- Postal code: 48540

Cherkavshchyna (Ukrainian: Черкавщина) is a village located in the Nahirianka rural hromada of Chortkiv Raion, Ternopil Oblast, Ukraine.

== History ==
The first written mention dates from 1453.

== Religion ==
- Church of the Assumption (UGCC, 1732, wooden, moved in 1936 from Tudoriv, Chortkiv Raion)
- Roman Catholic church

== People ==
- Yulian Nazarak (1893–1916), A Ukrainian poet, soldier, and a chorunzhy of the Legion of Ukrainian Sich Riflemen. On 24 August 2014, a monument to him was unveiled in the village (initiated by Mykhailo Skrypnyk, a native of the village).
