= Sosulivka =

Rural locality in Ternopil Oblast, Ukraine

Sosulivka Сосулівка
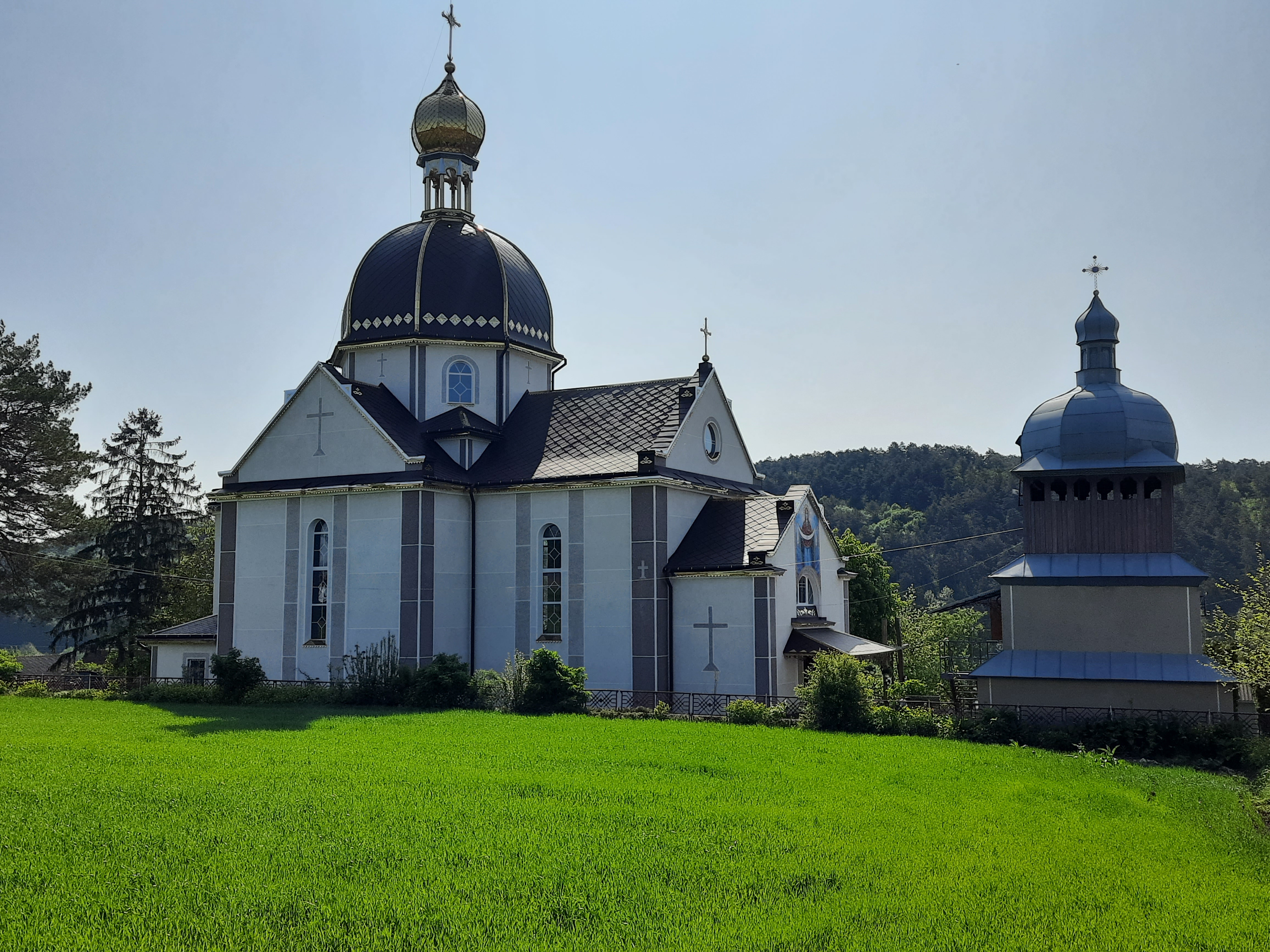
- Church of the Intercession of the Blessed Virgin Mary (1856), village of Sosulivka Chortkiv district, Ternopil region

- Location in Ternopil Oblast Sosulivka (Ternopil Oblast)
- Coordinates: 48°55′06″N 25°50′04″E
- Country: Ukraine
- Oblast: Ternopil Oblast
- Raion: Chortkiv Raion
- Hromada: Nahirianka Hromada
- Time zone: UTC+2 (EET)
  - Summer (DST): UTC+3 (EEST)
- Postal code: 48579

Sosulivka (Ukrainian: Сосулівка) is a village in Nahirianka rural hromada, Chortkiv Raion, Ternopil Oblast, Ukraine

== History ==
The settlement was founded around the 15th century.

== Religion ==
- Church of the Intercession (1856, OCU, brick)
- Church of the Intercession (2002, UGCC, brick)

== People ==
- Ivan Hapiak (born 1950), Ukrainian painter
- Pavlo Kachur (born 1953), Ukrainian scientist, public and political figure
- Mykhailo Derii (born 1956), Ukrainian businessman, public figure
- Pavlo Kachur (born 1953), Ukrainian scientist, public and political figure
- Borys Pohryshchuk (born 1971), Ukrainian businessman, Doctor of Economics, Professor
- Myron Sendziuk (born 1946), Ukrainian economist, scientist, associate professor
- Zenovii Kholodniuk (born 1961), Ukrainian businessman, public and political figure
- Hryhorii Shashkevych (1809–1888), Ukrainian public, political, educational and church figure, chairman of the Rus District Council, ambassador to the Austrian Parliament
