= Grotto of Saint Onuphrius, Ulashkivtsi =

Natural feature of Ukraine

Grotto of Saint Onuphrius
- Грот святого Онуфрія
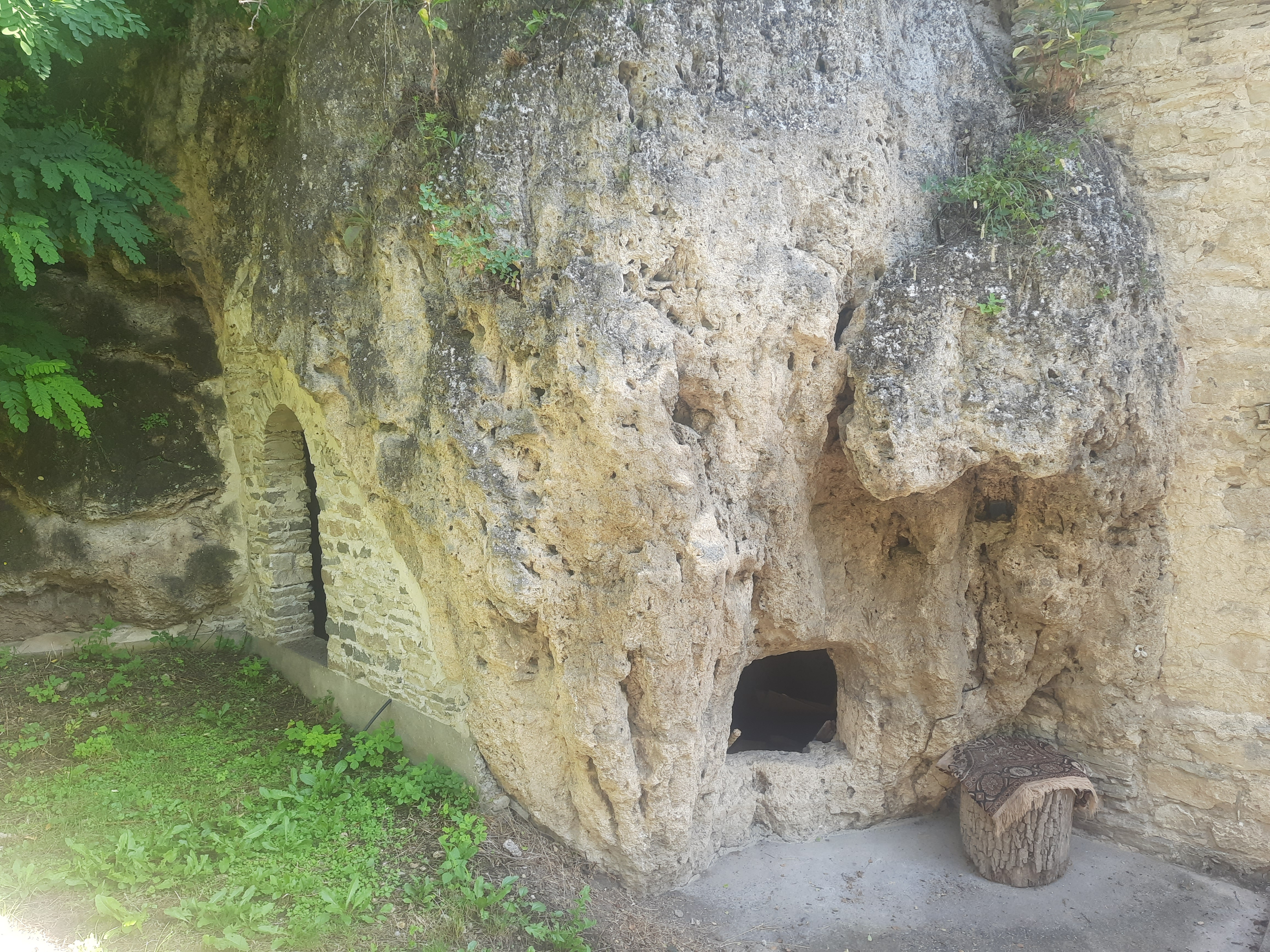
- Grotto of Saint Onuphrius
- Interactive map of Grotto of Saint Onuphrius
- Location: Ulashkivtsi, Ternopil Oblast, Ukraine
- Coordinates: 48°54′06″N 25°48′06″E

The Grotto of Saint Onuphrius (Ukrainian: Грот святого Онуфрія) is a unique geological monument of nature, archeology, and history of the left bank of Middle Podnistrovia. It is in Ulashkivtsi in the Nahirianka rural hromada, Chortkiv Raion, Ternopil Oblast.

== General information ==
It lies in the western outskirts of the village on the first floodplain terrace of the right bank of the Seret River, on a rocky travertine ledge of the mountain 4 meters below its top (Pid kliashtorom tract), above which is the monastery of the Basilian Fathers). The northeastern part of the rocky outcrop in the ravine is washed by the right bank of an unnamed stream. The grotto can be reached from the northwestern part of the mountain slope. Before the entrance to the grotto there is a sloping triangular plateau formed as a result of accumulation of deluvium deposits.

It is mentioned in scientific publications by such Polish and Ukrainian researchers as Mieczysław Orłowicz, Ivan Krypiakevych, Bohdan Ridush and others, who reported that there is a grotto associated with the cult of St. Onuphrius.

In 2011–2012, the grotto was investigated and examined by archaeologist, speleologist, researcher of antiquities, fortifications and toponymy Volodymyr Dobrianskyi. During his research, it was found that the grotto was formed in the limestone tuff of travertine. Such geological formations did not occur in marine but in continental conditions. According to the main morphological class, this grotto was formed in a cascade as a result of travertine build-up, in which the process of its karstification took place – later, the processes of formation of the travertine rock and the grotto were influenced by weathering and water erosion.

It has been established that 70 meters north of the grotto, in the slope of the ravine from which the spring flows (there is a figure of St. John the Baptist near it), a flint oblong-pyramidal plate made by chipping nucleos was found. This tool dates back to the Late Paleolithic-Mesolithic period.

In the spring of 2013, Volodymyr Dobrianskyi discovered and investigated a multilayered settlement 250–300 meters west of the grotto, located in the village suburb, which bears the toponymic name Khatky. It is located on a triangular promontory near the deep slopes of the steep bank of the right bank of the Seret River. During the survey, it was found that the settlement was completely destroyed by modern buildings. Unfortunately, the cultural layer was traced only in private gardens located along the slopes of the ravine. Antiquities of the Trypillian, Komarivska, and Goligradska cultures were discovered, studied, and examined here.

In all likelihood, in pre-Christian times there was a pagan sanctuary here, the existence of which is evidenced by a preserved limestone menhir that was specially brought here from a distance. It lies to the north of the grotto at the top of a travertine cliff, near which a spring flows. The menhir is now replaced by a water catchment basin and a statue of John the Baptist. Later, approximately in the XV-XVI centuries, a Christian skete appeared on the site of this sanctuary. Therefore, this small travertine grotto is the forerunner and the beginning of Christian monastic life, which developed and was formed in the village of Ulashkivtsi for several centuries. Its functional purpose is a hermitage. The adherents of this doctrine embodied the practice of hesychasm. This phenomenon in Podnistrovia is also embodied in the Greek Catholic rite, which is unique in the cultural space of the Catholic world, associated with the cult of St. Onuphrius the Great. Therefore, we argue that this is a unique region, which has no analogues not only in Ukraine but also in other neighboring and foreign countries. The philosophy of Hesychasm was also embodied in everyday life, architecture, and other manifestations of the cultural life of the left bank of Middle Podnistrovia and Galicia in the 16th and 19th centuries.

== Sources ==
- Добрянський В. Про результати археологічних обстежень пам'яток голіградської культури (XI-VI ст. до н. е.) на півдні Тернопільської області // Наукові записки Національного заповідника «Замки Тернопілля». — Збараж: «Вік», 2013. — No. 3. — С. 58–63.
- Добрянський В. Геологічне формування печер на Західному Поділлі та їх антропогенне використання: історія вивчення, дослідження і збереження //Археологія і фортифікація Середнього Подністров'я. III Всеукраїнська науково-практична конференція Кам'янець-Подільського музею-заповідника — Кам'янець-Подільський: ПП «Медобори-2006», 2013. — С. 45–50.
- Добрянський В. Природні карстові порожнини Західного Поділля як оборонно-фортифікаційні об'єкти // Наукові записки Національного заповідника «Замки Тернопілля». — Збараж: «Вік», 2013. — No. 3. — С. 118–124.
- Добрянський В. Печерні християнські скити Західного Поділля // Богословсько-філософські пошуки людини в історичному контексті: Збірник матеріалів II Християнських постових читань. — Львів: ЛПБА УПЦ КП, 2014. — С. 139–154.
- Добрянський В. Печерні християнські скити Лівобережжя Середнього Дністра // Наукові записки Національного історико-етнографічного заповідника «Переяслав» / IV Єфремівські читання «Релігійне життя Переяславської землі (ІХ-ХХІ ст.)», присвячені 1025-літтю хрещення Русі: збірник наукових статей. 2015. — Випуск 9 (11). — С. 143–152.
- Добрянський В. Археологічно-спелеологічне обстеження гроту Святого Онуфрія в с. Улашківцях Тернопільської області // Наукові записки Національного історико-етнографічного заповідника «Переяслав» / IV Єфремівські читання «Релігійне життя Переяславської землі (ІХ-ХХІ ст.)», присвячені 1025-літтю хрещення Русі: збірник наукових статей. 2016. — Випуск 10 (12). — С. 31–35.
