= Mukhavka =

Rural locality in Ternopil Oblast, Ukraine

Mukhavka Мухавка
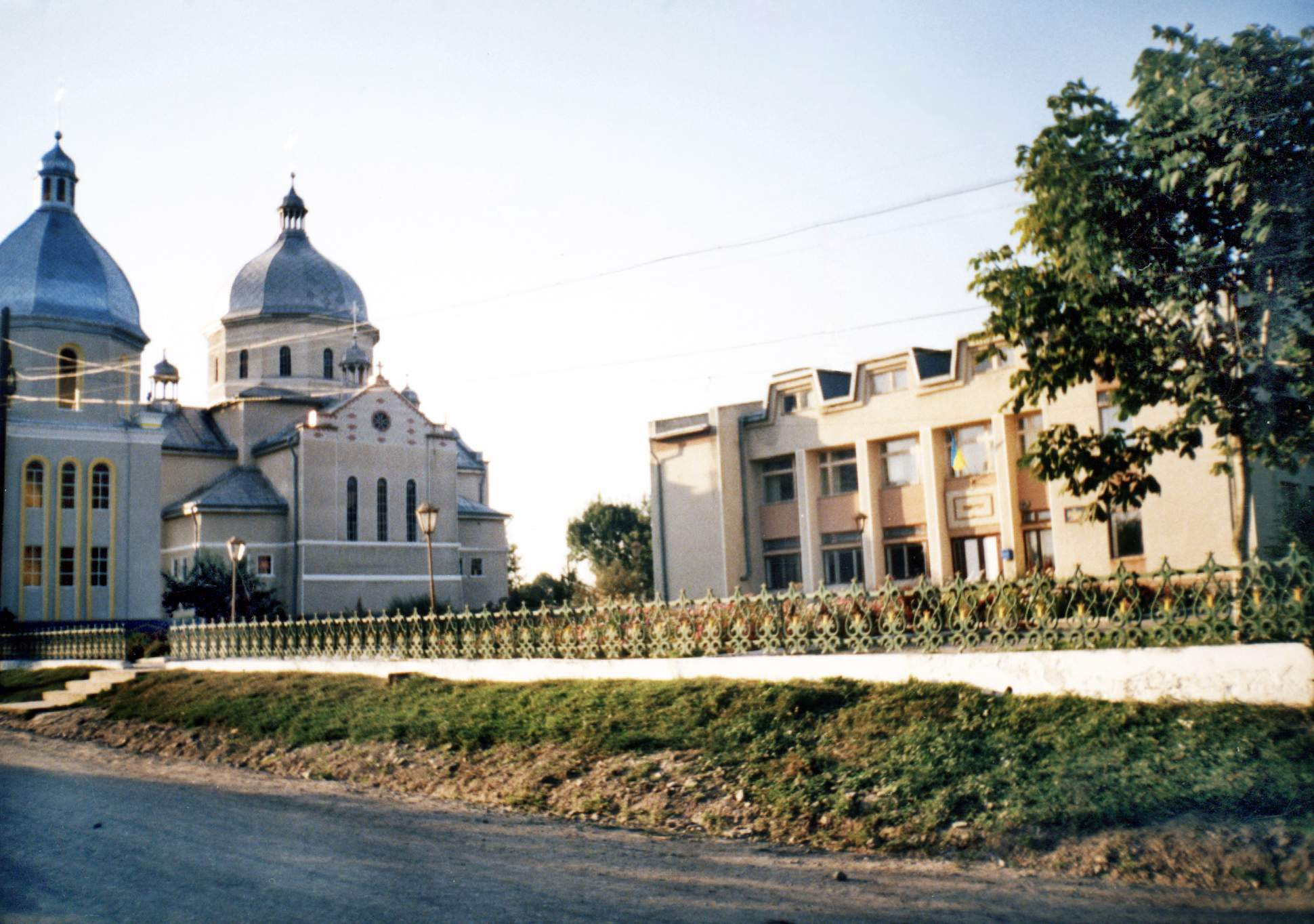

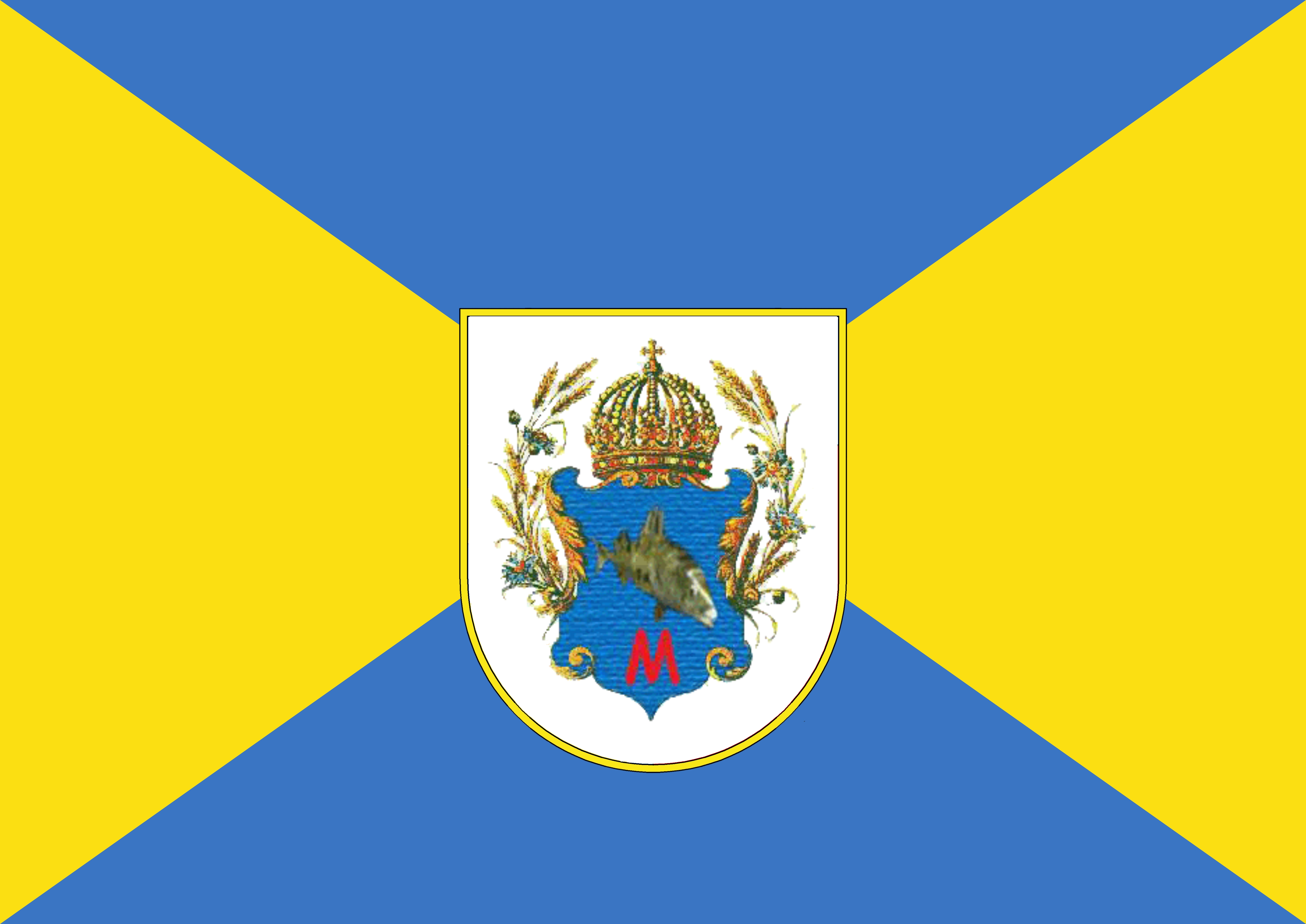
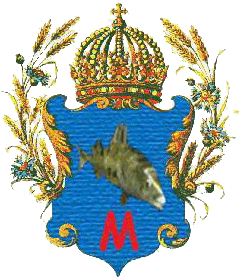
- Flag Coat of arms

- Location in Ternopil Oblast
- Coordinates: 48°54′7″N 25°43′31″E
- Country: Ukraine
- Region: Ternopil Oblast
- Area: Chortkiv Raion
- Community: Nahirianka Hromada
- First mentioned: 1469
- Time zone: UTC+2 (EET)
  - Summer (DST): UTC+3 (EEST)
- Postal code: 48544

Mukhavka (Ukrainian: Мухавка, Polish: Muchhawka, German: Mukhavka) is a village in Nahirianka rural hromada, Chortkiv Raion, Ternopil Oblast, Ukraine. The administrative center of the former Mukhav village council. According to the Polish and Austrian documents "List of populated places of the Ternopil District in 1867", the villages of Zhabyntsi, Pulyak and Stavky belonged to the village of Muhavka.

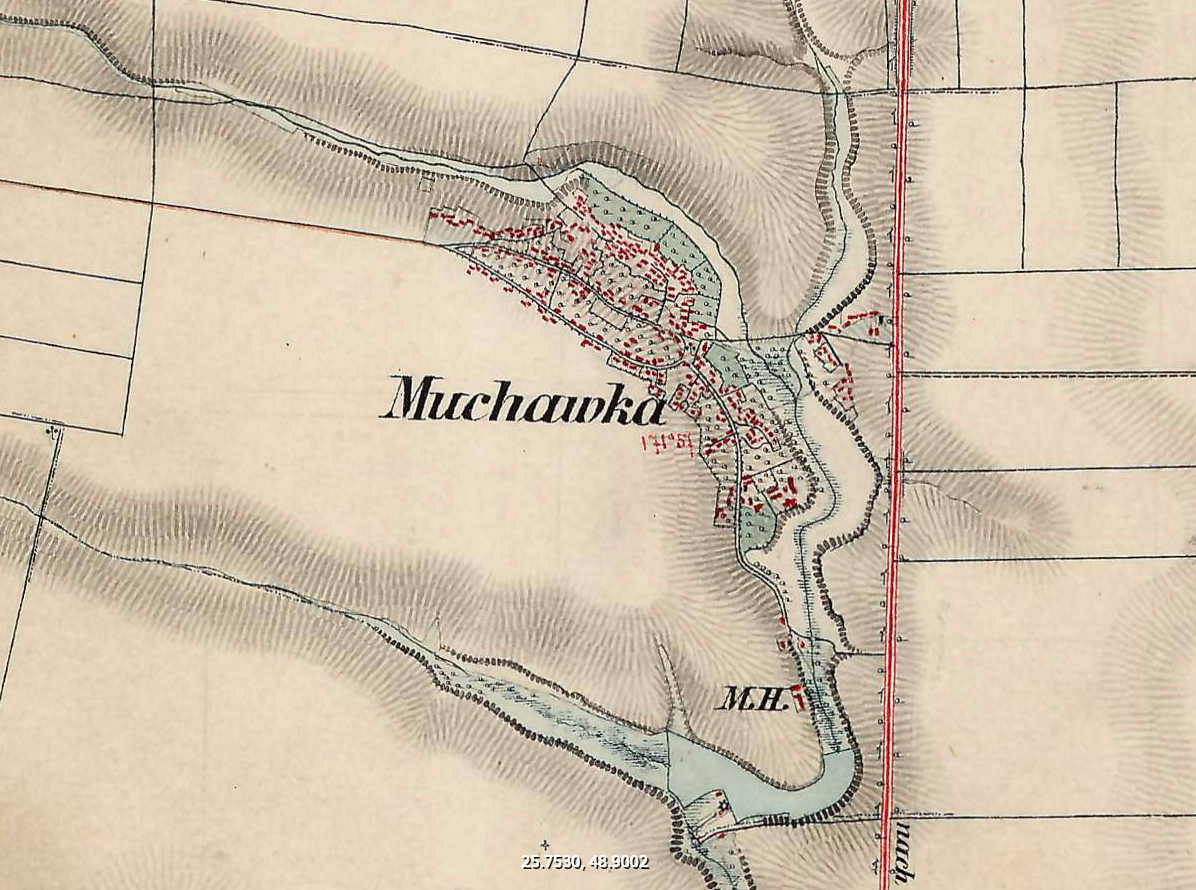
Mukhavka on the topographic map of Galicia and Bukovina in 1861–1864

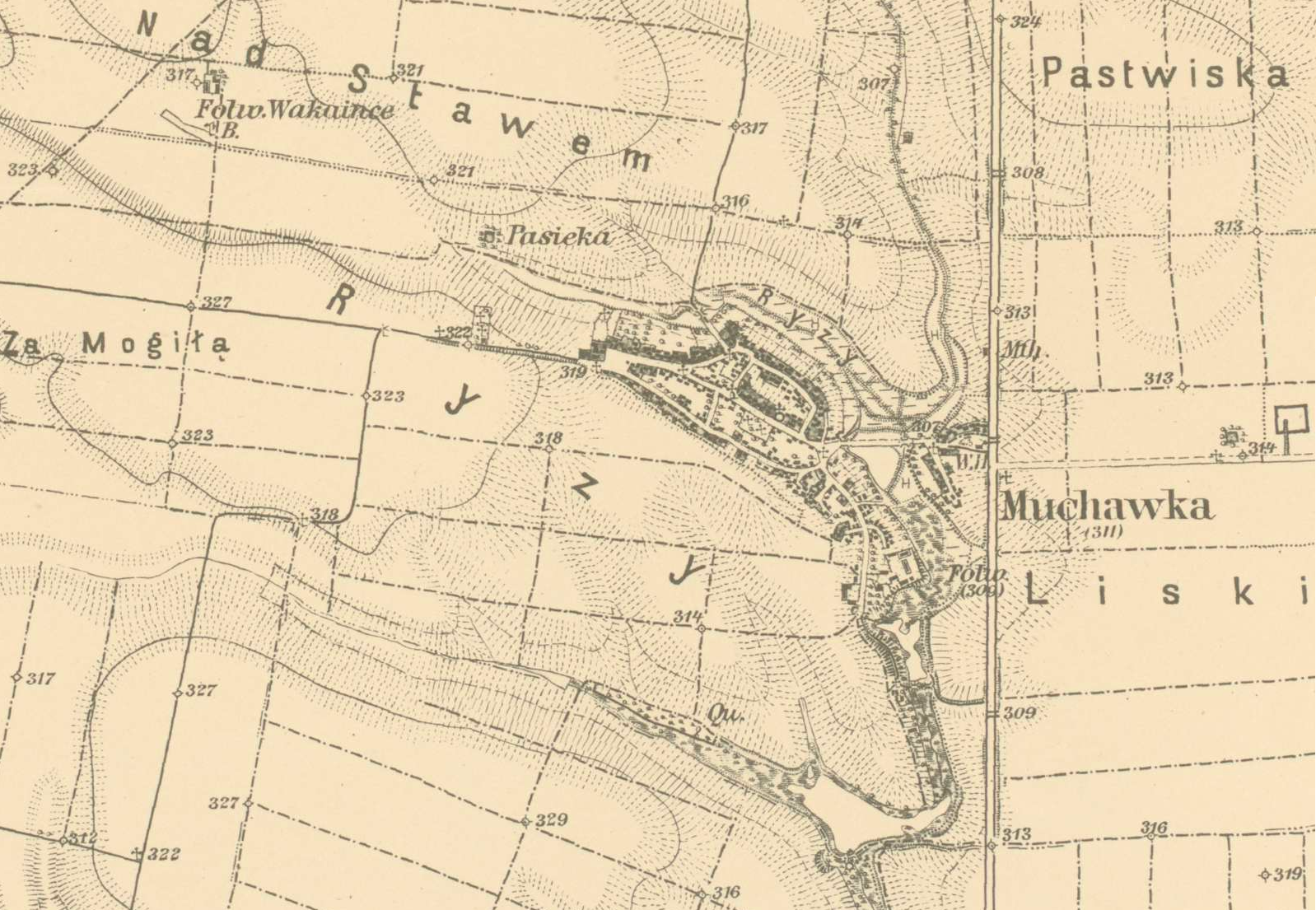
Mukhava on the topographic map of the Kingdom of Galicia and Volhynia in 1869-1887

Mukhavka on the topographic map of the Kingdom of Galicia and Lodomeria in 1884

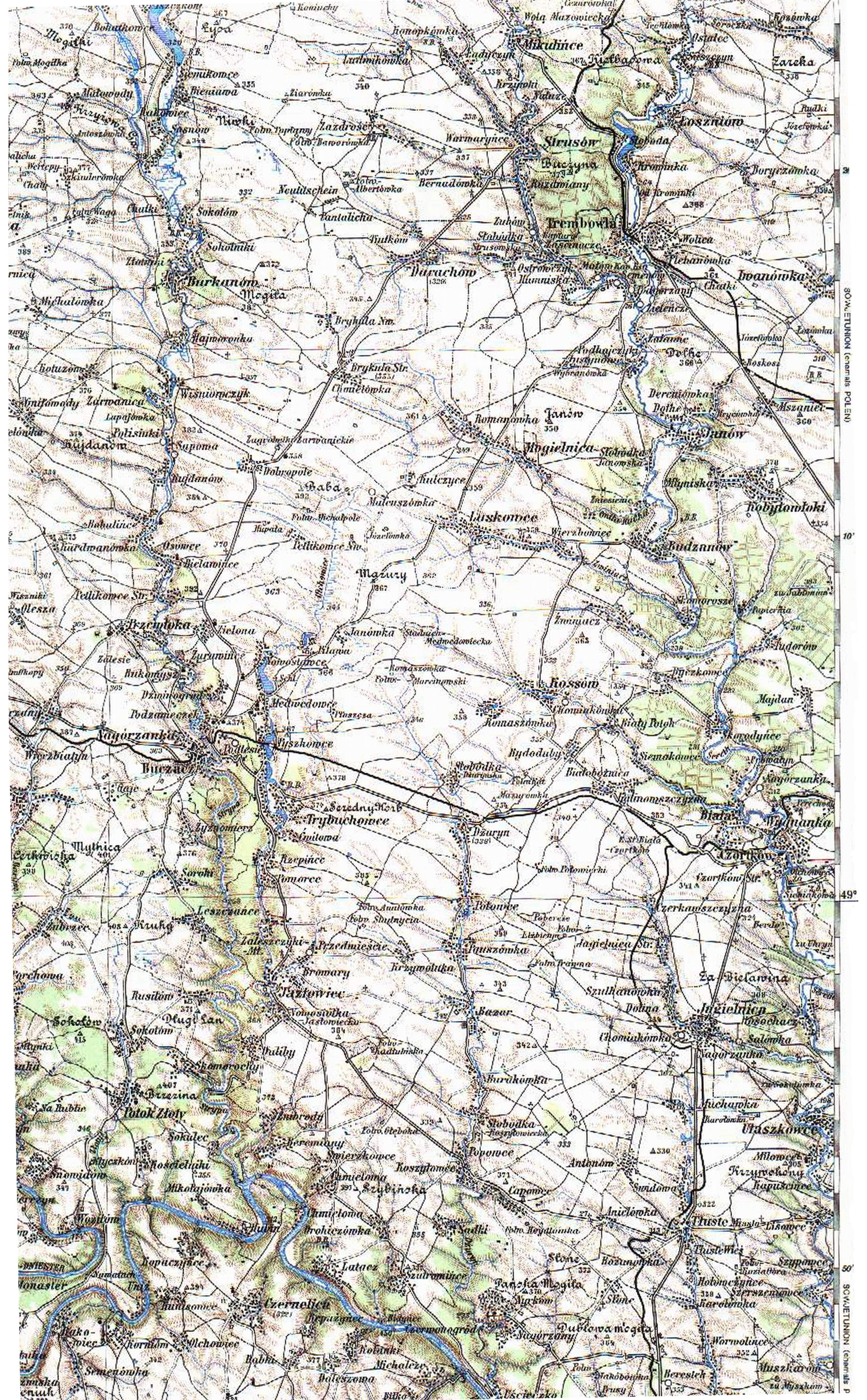
Mukhavka on the topographic map of the Kingdom of Galicia and Lodomeria in 1902

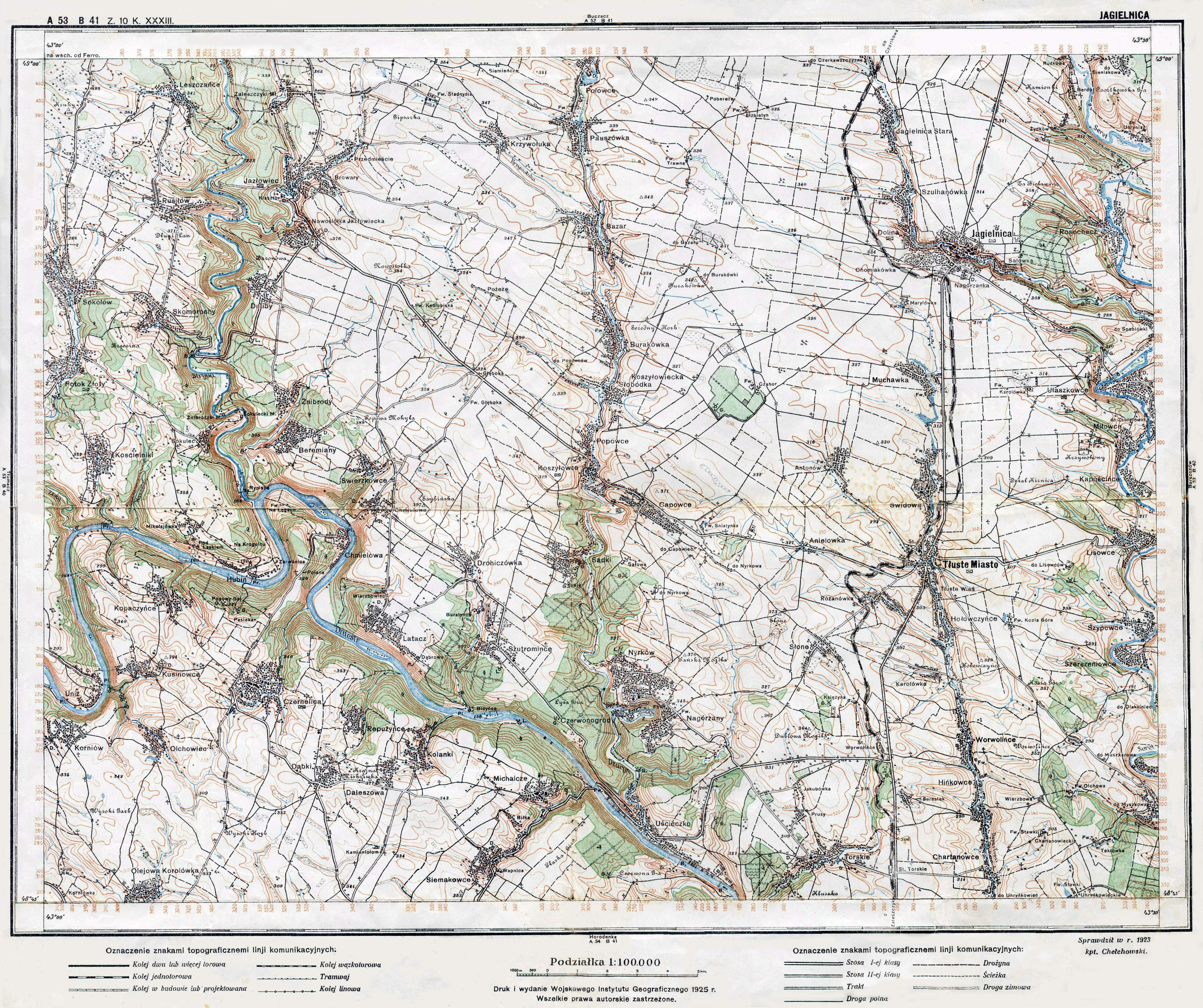
Mukhavka on the topographic map of the Polish Republic in 1923

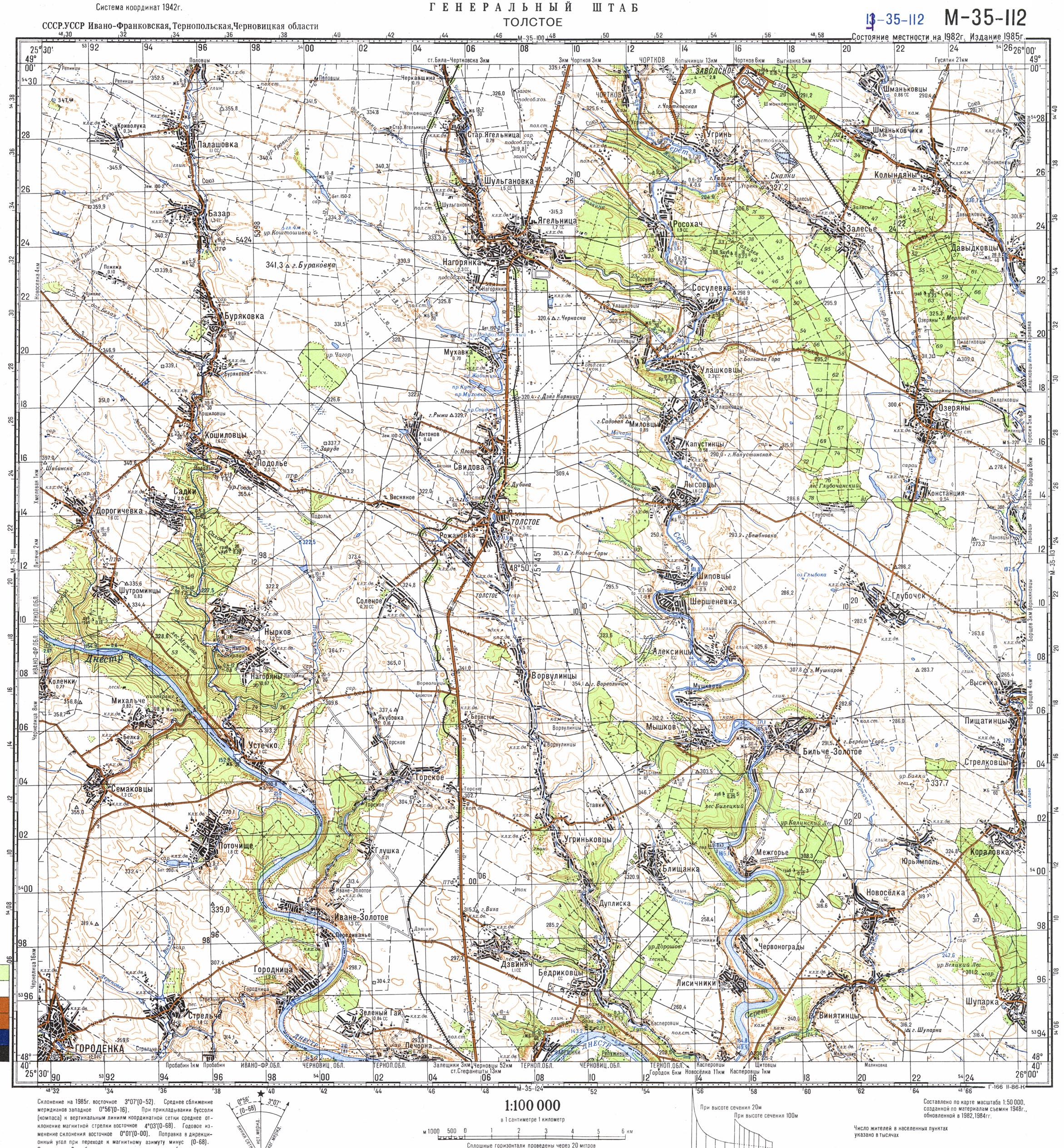
Mukhavka on the map of the General Staff of the USSR, 1948. Square m-35-112

The village of Mukhavka is known from written sources since 1448.

== Etymology ==
The most likely version of the origin of the name of the village of Mukhavka is that the name of the village is associated with the river Tupa (Dupla).

According to this version, the name of the village of Mukhavka comes from the large number of flies that lived in the river Tupa (Dupla). This version has a right to exist, since the river Tupa (Dupla) is a small river that is an ideal place for the reproduction of flies.

It is possible that the name of the village comes from this – Mukhavka.

This version is also supported by the fact that there are many other names of settlements in the Ukrainian language that are associated with flies. For example, the villages of Mukhlyaki, Mukholovka, and Mukhy.

== Geography ==
The village of Muhavka is located on both banks of the Tupa River (Dupla, Pol. Dupa), the right tributary of the Seret River, the basin of the Dniester River. A cascade of 13 ponds has been created on the Tupa River, in front of the village, in the village itself and behind the village.

The distance to the district center — the city of Chortkiv — is 15 km, to the administrative center of the community — the village of Nahiryanka — 4 km. The road passes through the M19 and E85 international highway.

=== Localities ===
- Mukhavka is a village. On the right bank of the Tupa River are parts of the villages of Center, Dolishnya, Obranivka and Filvarok, on the left - Voloshchyna.
- Zhabyntsi is a hamlet (until 1970), located 1 km south of the village. In 1952, the farm had 5 yards and 15 inhabitants. In the mid-1970s, the inhabitants of the farm moved to the village of Mukhavka.
- Pulyak is a hamlet (until 1947), located 1.3 km south of the village. Mykhailo Pulyak's farm, the manor's mill and the miller's house were on the farm. In 1947, M. Pulyak's son Ivan and grandson Stepan were sentenced to 25 years in prison. I. Pulyak returned in 1953, his grandson in 1958; settled in the nearby village of Khomyakivka.
- Stavky (Wakaince) is a hamlet (until 1950) located 1.4 km northwest of the village. In 1949, the farm had 7 yards and 45 inhabitants.

== History ==
=== Ancient times ===
Archaeological sites from the ancient times have been found near the village of Mukhavka.

- Mukhavka I settlement
- Mukhavka II settlement
- Mukhavka III ground burial

=== Middle Ages ===
In the 15th century, the village of Mushkavka was owned by the Buczacki family.

The first written mention of the village dates back to 1469.

In the 16th century, the village of Mushkavka passed into the ownership of the Lanckoroński family.

According to the "Geographical Dictionary of the Kingdom of Poland and Other Slavic Countries" as of 1565, Iagilnicia and probably the surrounding villages, including the village of Mushkavka, were owned by the Lanckoroński family.

The ownership of the village of Mushkavka by the Lanckoroński family can be traced back to the following centuries, in particular, according to archival documents of the 18th century "List of Lanckoroński estates in 1770" and "List of taxes paid by the inhabitants of the village of Mushkavka to the Lanckoroński family in 1775", in the 19th century in the book "Cadastral description of the village of Mushkavka" of 1847 it is mentioned that the village of Mushkavka is owned by Count Jan Lanckoroński, in the book "Directory of all places located in the Kingdom of Galicia and Lodomeria, as well as in the Grand Duchy of Krakow and the Principality of Bukovina" of 1885 it is mentioned that the village of Mushkavka is owned by Count Karol Lanckoroński.

Spis katastralny wsi Muchawka 1847 rok Wieś Muchawka	Cadastral Description of the Village of Mukhavka 1847 Mukhavka Village
Wieś Muchawka położona jest w powiecie Czortkowieckim, na terenie wsi Jagiełnica. Wieś ma powierzchnię 804 morgi. Ludność wsi wynosi 1000 osób. W wsi znajduje się cerkiew prawosławna, szkoła i 2 karczmy. Ziemie wsi Muchawka są własnością Jego Wysokości hrabiego Jana Lanckorońskiego. W wsi znajdują się następujący właściciele działek gruntowych: · Jego Wysokość hrabia Jan Lanckoroński - 600 mórg; · Jan Krawiec - 100 mórg; · Michał Krawiec - 50 mórg; · Jan Iwanczuk - 50 mórg; · Michał Iwanczuk - 50 mórg. Wieś Muchawka ma następujące dochody: · z dzierżawy ziemi - 1000 złotych; · z podatków - 500 złotych. Wydatki wsi Muchawka: · na utrzymanie cerkwi prawosławnej - 200 złotych; · na utrzymanie szkoły - 100 złotych; · na utrzymanie karczm - 200 złotych. Czysty zysk wsi Muchawka wynosi 500 złotych.	Mukhavka village is located in Chortkiv district, in the territory of Yagilnytsia volost. The village has an area of 804 morgs. The population of the village is 1,000 people. The village has an Orthodox church, a school, and 2 taverns. The lands of Mukhavka village are owned by His Highness Count Jan Lanckoroński. The following owners of land plots are registered in the village: · His Highness Count Jan Lanckoroński - 600 morgs; · Ivan Kravets - 100 morgs; · Mykhailo Kravets - 50 morgs; · Ivan Ivanchuk - 50 morgs; · Mykhailo Ivanchuk - 50 morgs. Mukhavka village has the following incomes: · from land rent - 1,000 zloty; · from taxes - 500 zloty. Mukhavka village expenses: · for the maintenance of the Orthodox church - 200 zloty; · for the maintenance of the school - 100 zloty; · for the maintenance of the taverns - 200 zloty. The net profit of Mukhavka village is 500 zloty.

According to the "Geographical Dictionary of the Kingdom of Poland and Other Slavic Countries, "Vol.6", published in 1885, on pages 790-791, it is stated that the village of Muhavka belonged to the estate complex of the village of Jagielnytsia, also known as Jagielnytsia key, which the Liantskoronski family owned until 1939

Muchawka, wś, pow. czortkowski, nad rz. Dupą, o 6 km. na płd. od Jagielnicy i tyleż na płd. od Tłustego, przy gościńcu rządowym lwowskozaleszczyckim, graniczy na wschód z Ułaszkowcami i Milowcami, na płd. ze Swidową, ną zach. z Antonowem, na płn. z Nagorzanką, przedmieściem Jagielnicy, leży w najlepszej podolskiej glebie; oprócz zwykłych zboż udaje się tu doskonale kukurydza i tytuń, którego znaczne plantacye utrzymują włościanie dla pobliskiej fabryki tytoniu w Jagielnicy; obszar dwor. grun. orne 872, łąk 94 pastw. 9; włośc. grun. orne 1376, łąk 68, pastw. 2 kw., mr.; ludn. rzym. kat. 222, par. w Jagielnicy, gr. kat. 680, par. Świdowa, szkoła filialna o 1 nauczycielu, kasa pożyczk, z kapit. 1600 zł. a. w. Sąd pow. Czortków, urząd poczt. Jagielnica. Należy z całym kluczem ułaszkowieckim do Karola hr. Lanckorońskiego.	Mukhavka, a village in the Chortkiv district, on the Tupa River, about 6 km south of Yagilnytsia and exactly south of Tluste, on the state road Lviv-Zalishchyky, borders on the east with Ulashkivtsi and Milivtsi, on the south with Svidova, on the west with Antonov, on the north with Nahyrianka, a suburb of Yagilnytsia, lies in the best Podolian land; in addition to ordinary cereals, corn and tobacco grow very well here, large plantations of which are maintained by the peasants for the neighboring tobacco factory in Yagilnytsia; overview of the territory: arable land 872, meadows 94 pastures. 9; arable land in the volost 1376, meadows 68, pastures 2 square morgs; population: r-kat. 222 to the parish in Yagilnytsia, gr.-kat. 680 to the parish in Svidova, a branch school with 1 teacher, a credit union with a capital of 1600 zlotys. district court in Chortkiv, post office in Yagilnytsia. Belongs with the entire Ulashkivtsi key to Count Karol Lanckoroński.
Słownik geograficzny Królestwa Polskiego i innych krajów słowiańskich. T.6, s.790-791	Geographical Dictionary of the Kingdom of Poland and other Slavic territories. Vol. 6, p. 790-791

The Yagilnicza estate encompassed the lands around the towns of Yagilnytsia and Ulashkivtsi, as well as the villages of Antonów, Chomyakivka, Dolina, Nahyrianka, Mukhavka, Swidova, Sosulivka, Stara Yagilnytsia, Rosokhach, Saliwka, Shulhanivka, and Zabolotivka. It consisted of 14 manors. The manors in the villages of Stara Yagilnytsia, Rosokhach, Sosulivka, Mukhavka, Swidova, and Antonów were leased out.

Two distilleries, a brewery, several water mills, bakeries, and a brickyard operated on the territory of the Yagilnicza estate. In the village of Muhawka itself, there was a distillery and a water mill.

According to the administrative division of the 16th century, the village of Mukhavka belonged to the Kamieniec Podolski county of the Podolia voivodeship.

Under the Treaty of Buchach (1672), the village of Mukhavka was under the rule of the Ottoman Empire from 1672 to 1684 and belonged to the Chortkiv nahie of the Kamieniec Podolski eyalet of the Podolia pashalik.

After the First Partition of Poland in 1772, the village of Mukhavka belonged to the Austrian possessions of the Habsburgs in the Holy Roman Empire (from 1804, the Austrian Empire, from 1867, Austria-Hungary). It belonged to the Zalishchyky, later Chortkiv district of the "kreisy".

In 1809-1815, the village of Mukhavka belonged to the Russian Empire as one of the villages of the Chortkiv district of the Ternopil region.

In 1867-1918, the Mukhavka community (gmina) belonged to the Chortkiv district of the crownland of the Kingdom of Galicia and Lodomeria, part of the Austrian Empire, from 1867, Austria-Hungary.

=== XX Century ===
In 1907, elections were held in the village of Mukhavka, from the 69th district, to the Vienna Parliament. 356 votes out of 404 valid and 407 cast out of 442 registered voters from the village of Mukhavka (including voters from the village of Antoniv) were received by the pro-Ukrainian candidate Dr. A. Kolessa, other candidates: Dr. Jan Socha, Polish national candidate; Dr. A. Mahler, Zionist candidate; K. Wojewoda, radical Polish candidate; Ks. D. Biliński, Moscovite candidate; J. lir. Baworowiki, conservative Polish candidate and W. Hładysz, Russian socialist received the remaining 48 votes.

During World War I, a resident of Mukhavka, Volodymyr Kotsyuk, volunteered for the Ukrainian Galician Army (UGA).

In 1918, the village of Mukhavka became part of the West Ukrainian People's Republic (ZUNR).

During the Polish-Ukrainian War, on June 7, 1919, during the offensive known in history as the Chortkiv Offensive, with a blow through the village of Muhavka, the UHA broke through the Polish front and captured Yagilnytsia, and the next day liberated Chortkiv. An excerpt from "Memoirs of the Liberation War of the Ataman Alexander Hnizdovsky", which describes the battles that took place through the village of Mukhavka.

In 1920, the village of Mukhavka was annexed to the Polish Republic, and the property was transferred under the management of the Polish state.

Since August 1, 1934, Muhavka belonged to the gmina of Svidova, Chortkiv County, Ternopil Voivodeship.

From 1939 to 1941 and from 1944 to 1991, the village of Mukhavka belonged to the Chortkiv district of Ternopil region of the Ukrainian Soviet Socialist Republic.

During 1939-1941, 19 residents of the village were held in the Chortkiv NKVD prison, of whom 3 were tortured and executed - Vasyl Barytsky, Karl Okhvat and Mykola Strotsen.

From July 1941, during World War II, the village of Mukhavka was under German occupation. On April 14, 1944, the village of Mukhavka was liberated, together with other neighboring villages of Tluste, Antoniv, Yagilnytsia, Shulganivka, and Stara Yagilnytsia.

According to the report of the district research commission (district research commission) dated 07/01/44, there was a camp for Jewish people (ghetto) in the village of Mukhavka, which housed about 200 people, who were almost all killed during 1941-1944 (State Archive of the Russian Federation, fund R-7021, description 75, case 107, sheet 324 back, pages 95–96, 98).

During World War II, 36 residents of the village were killed or went missing.

In 1943-1945, an underground printing house operated in Mukhavka, which published the newspaper "Svoboda".

Until the mid-1950s, armed struggle of the OUN-UPA underground continued in the village. Stepan Barytsky, Ivan Burynyuk, Yosyp Vynarchuk, Stepan Vozhnyi, Mykhailo Zhegus, Petro Kokhan, Ivan Suchelnytskyi and many others fought in the UPA units.

=== New times ===
In 1992, a symbolic grave was erected for all those who fought for the independence of Ukraine. A steel cross with the inscription "Glory to the fighters who fell for the freedom of Ukraine" was erected on the grave, and a chapel of the Mother of God (1908) was built nearby. The grave was consecrated on August 24, 1992, in honor of the first anniversary of Ukraine's Independence Day.

In 1994, a train stop was opened in the village of Mukhavka. This was facilitated by the former school director Grushchych P.T., the head of the village council Berezovsky G.R., and the People's Deputy of Ukraine Mr. Metyuk. A small stop with a platform was built in Mukhavka, and electricity was supplied. On August 19, on Spas, the train connecting Ternopil - Chernivtsi stopped for the first time in the village of Mukhavka.

Girls in embroidered shirts met him with bread and salt, and the head of the village council Mr. Berezovsky awarded the locomotive driver with a wreath of periwinkle.

In 1998, the memorial cross in honor of the abolition of serfdom was completely restored (it was originally wooden). This cross was destroyed twice. The first time, partially in 1943, after which it was placed on a low pedestal; in 1948, the cross was completely destroyed. In 1968, the cross was partially restored.

Since December 1, 2020, Mukhavka has been part of the Nagoryanska rural community.

== Religion ==
Greek Catholic Church

It is likely that there was a church in the village of Mukhavka at the beginning or in the middle of the 18th century. This church was wooden and was dedicated to St. Paraskeva.

1779 - The first known image of the Church of St. Paraskeva in the village of Mukhavka on a topographic map of the Kingdom of Galicia and Volhynia in 1779-1783.

1784 - The first written mention, in the publication of the UGCC "Schematism of the All-Holy Clergy of the Greek Catholic Diocese of Stanislaviv in 1887", about the keeping of a separate metric for the village of Mukhavka at the Church of St. Paraskeva: records of birth, baptism, marriage and death.

- Church of St. Paraskeva Ternovska (UGCC, wooden, 1860). Since 1990, it has been transferred to the status of a Worship Chapel, in which the "Parental Icon" museum was opened in 2012.
- Church of St. Paraskeva Ternovska (UGCC, stone, 1926). In 2002, a two-storey stone bell tower was built next to the church.
- Chapel of Jesus Christ (2013).
- Chapel of the Mother of God (2013).

Roman Catholic church

- Catholic Church (not operating, 1938).

Church of Saint Paraskeva of Ternovska (UGCC, wooden, 1860)	Church of Saint Paraskeva of Ternovska (UGCC, stone, 1926)	Catholic Church (non-functioning, brick, 1938)

== Monuments ==
- Taras Shevchenko Monument (1959).
- Memorial to Soldiers from the Local Area Who Died in World War II (1969).
- Figure of Saint Yuri, near the old wooden church, where there was once a cemetery (on the territory of the present park, opposite the school).
- A symbolic grave with a chapel of the Mother of God and an iron cross dedicated to the Fighters for the Freedom of Ukraine.
- A memorial cross dedicated to the abolition of serfdom.

Memorial to Soldiers from the Local Area Who Died in World War II	Figure of Saint Yuri	A symbolic grave to the Fighters for the Freedom of Ukraine

== Education, social sphere, economy ==
School

According to written sources, a school has been operating in the village of Mukhkavka since the second half of the 19th century:

- Under Austro-Hungary:
  - 1870 — the first written mention of a primary school in the village of Mukhavka (szkoła trywialna), with teacher Marcin Gocko (Gocko Marcin).
  - 1891 — a one-class school with Ukrainian language of instruction (93 children).
  - 1910 — a modern school building was built.
  - 1913 — a two-class school with Ukrainian language of instruction.
- Under the Polish Republic:
  - 1924 — a two-class school with Polish language of instruction.
  - 1927 — a three-class school, bilingual (Ukrainian, Polish).
- Under the Ukrainian Soviet Socialist Republic:
  - 1949 — the school was reorganized into a seven-year school.
  - 1952 — the first graduation of Mukhavka seven-year school.
  - 1958 — the school building was expanded.
  - 1961 — the first graduation of eight-year school.
  - 1964 — Another school building was built.
- Under independent Ukraine:
  - 1991 — the school was reorganized into a nine-year school.

Social sphere

Since the end of the 19th and early 20th centuries, branches of the following societies have been operating in the village: «Prosvita», «Sich», «Lug», «Sokol» (1934), «Skala» (1934 р.),«Silsky Gospodar», «Union of small-scale nobility» (1939 р.), «Association of Folk Schools» (1937 р.).

Girls from the village: Zosya Smityukh, Yustia Strotsen, Dominika Strotsen, and others were members of the organization "Soyuz Ukrainok" (1938).

In the 1890s, a «Prosvita» reading room was founded, which had a library (destroyed during World War I).

The village of Mukhavka also had branches of financial institutions: the Ukrainian cooperative "Nedila" (1922) and the Ukrainian cooperative "Yednist" (1927).

In 1990-1991, a new House of Culture was built, which also houses the Mukhavka Village Council and the Village Library.

Currently, there is a kindergarten, a general practice and family medicine clinic, shopping establishments, "Fortuna" and "Bagrii" farms.

House of Culture, Library, Village Council in Mukhavka	School in Mukhavka	Kindergarten in Mukhavka

Economy

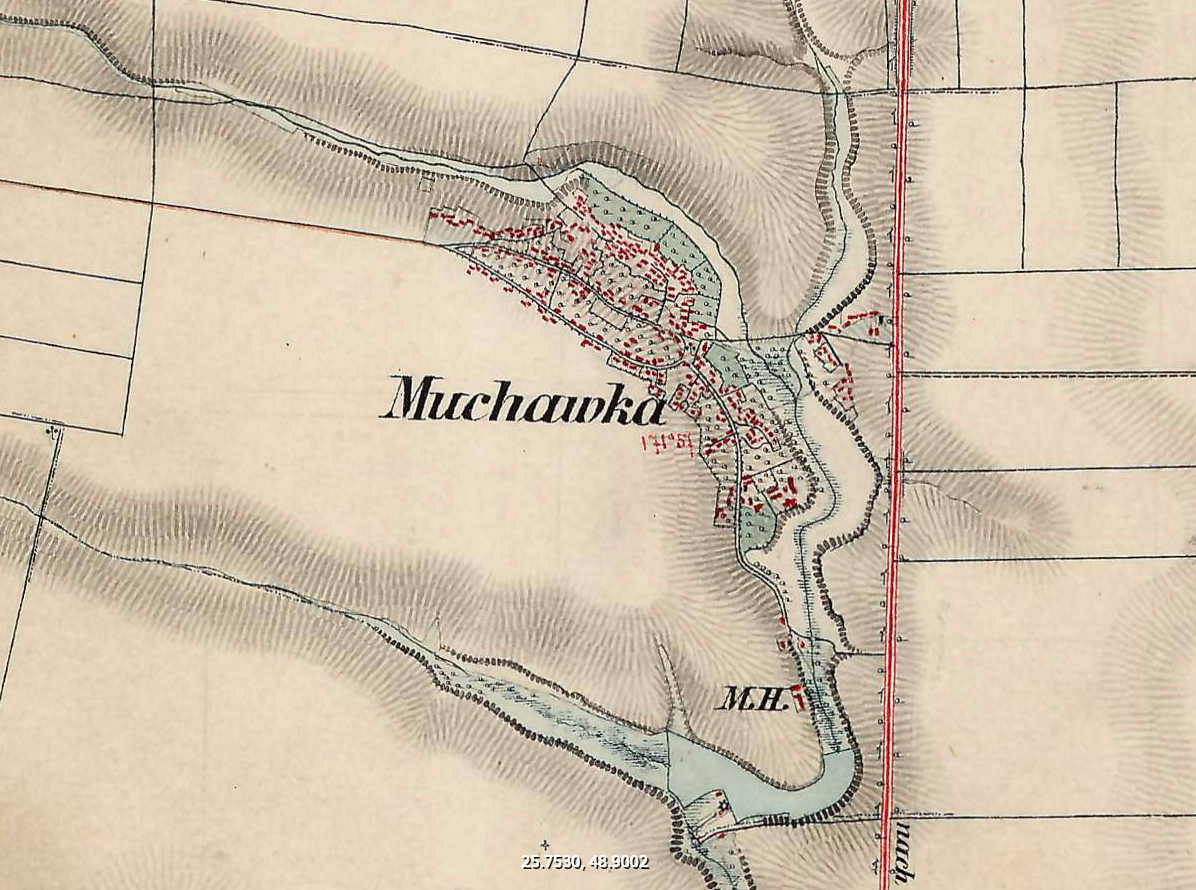
Mukhavka on the topographic map of Galicia and Bukovina in 1861–1864

It seems likely that the ponds on the Tupa River in the village of Muhavka were created shortly after the village was founded.

In the 19th century, their reconstruction (expansion) took place to increase the volume of fish farming and more effective irrigation of fields. The ponds had to have an area of at least 100 square fathoms and a depth of at least 1.5 meters.

In the 20th century, during the time of the Polish Republic, as part of the land reclamation program in Galicia in 1930-1939, the construction of new ponds began in the village of Muhavka in 1936 and was completed in 1938. Their number increased to 13, the depth of the ponds was increased to about 2 meters, and the area of the largest was about 10 hectares.

The ponds were intended for fish farming. Industrial fish farming in the ponds of the village of Muhavka took place until the mid-2000s.

6th pond in Mukhavka	3th pond in Mukhavka
Ponds in the village of Muhavka

Now the ponds are owned by the village of Mukhavka and are an important element of the infrastructure of the village, as well as a place of rest for both local residents and numerous vacationers from the entire district.

== Population ==
According to the All-Ukrainian population census of 2001, 706 people lived in the village.

Distribution of the population by native language according to the 2001 census:
Language	Population size		Percentage	
Ukrainian	693	706	98,16%	100%
Russian	13	706	1,84%	100%

As of 2020, the population of the village has decreased to 615 people.

Year	Population size village Mukhavka from 1836 to 2020			
Year	Ukrainians	Latins and Poles	Jews	In general
1836	641			641
1839	642			642
1840	695			695
1842	678			678
1843	690			690
1844	730			730
1845	632			632
1848	706			706
1850	690			690
1851	705			705
1855	632			632
1856	631			631
1857	631			631
1858	631			631
1859	633			633
1860	645			645
1861	621			621
1862	633			633
1863	648			648
1864	635			635
1865	640			640
1866	644			644
1867	638			638
1868	680			680
1871	690			690
1872	708			708
1874	702			702
1875	709			709
1876	704			704
1877	706			706
1878	697			697
1879	678			678
1880	678			678
1881	778			778
1882	680			680
1883	680			680
1886	800			800
1887	800			800
1888	810			810
1890	800			800
1891	810			810
1892	924	6	60	990
1894	924			924
1895	958	250	38	1246
1896	972	180	32	1184
1897	983	172	27	1182
1898	995	163	27	1185
1899	1010	153	30	1193
1900	990	152	28	1170
1901	1009	150	28	1187
1902	1029	154	28	1211
1903	1030	156	28	1214
1904	1055	158	26	1239
1905	1050	150	27	1227
1906	1039	147	26	1212
1907	1044	151	27	1222
1909	1090	160	23	1273
1910	1100	147	26	1273
1911	1110	150	28	1288
1912	1156	159	32	1347
1913	1178	162	32	1372
1914	1190	161	30	1381
1921				1195
1925	1100	300	48	1448
1927	1100	293	20	1413
1929	1100	294	21	1415
1930	954	274	21	1249
1931	957	275	21	1253
1935	993	285	18	1296
1938	1005	301	18	1324
1939	1020	340	20	1380
1993				678
2001				706
2014				620
2018				628
2020				615

== Famous people ==
=== Were born ===
- Joachim Kardinal (1889-1960) was an entrepreneur and public figure in Canada
- Volodymyr Tarnavskyi (1912-2002) was a religious and public figure in Canada
- Dmytro Kovtsun (September 29, 1955) is a Ukrainian track and field athlete, a participant in the Olympic Games

== Sources ==
- (in Ukrainian) Золотоцька Г., Карпович В., Мухавка // Ternopil Encyclopedic Dictionary: in 4 v. / editorial board: H. Yavorskyi and other, Ternopil: "Zbruch", 2005, V. 2: К—О, S. 581. — ISBN 966-528-199-2.
- (in Ukrainian) Уніят В., Федечко М., Мухавка // Ternopil Oblast. History of cities and villages: in 3 v. / Ternopil: "Terno-graph", 2014, V. 3: М—Ш, S. 489—490. — ISBN 978-966-457-246-7.
- "Muchawka, wś, pow. czortkowski". Geographical Dictionary of the Kingdom of Poland (in Polish). 6. Warszawa: Kasa im. Józefa Mianowskiego. 1885. p. 790.

== Literature ==
- І позолота сонця на раменах Христа // Голос Народу. — 2016. — № 41 (7 жовт.). — С. 12.
