= Kapustyntsi, Chortkiv Raion =

Rural locality in Ternopil Oblast, Ukraine

Kapustyntsi Капустинці
- Location in Ternopil Oblast
- Coordinates: 48°52′17″N 25°49′27″E
- Country: Ukraine
- Oblast: Ternopil Oblast
- Raion: Chortkiv Raion
- Hromada: Nahirianka Hromada
- First mentioned: 1439
- Time zone: UTC+2 (EET)
  - Summer (DST): UTC+3 (EEST)
- Postal code: 48564

Kapustyntsi (Ukrainian: Капустинці) is a village in Nahirianka rural hromada, Chortkiv Raion, Ternopil Oblast, Ukraine.

== History ==
The first written mention of the settlement dates back to 1439, and it was later mentioned in 1442 as the property of Lukasz Łojowicz.

== Religion ==
- Saint Nicholas churches (OCU, 1898, brick) and the UGCC (2013, architect Ivan Hudyma)
