= Villem Reiman (activist) =

Estonian activist, historian and clergyman

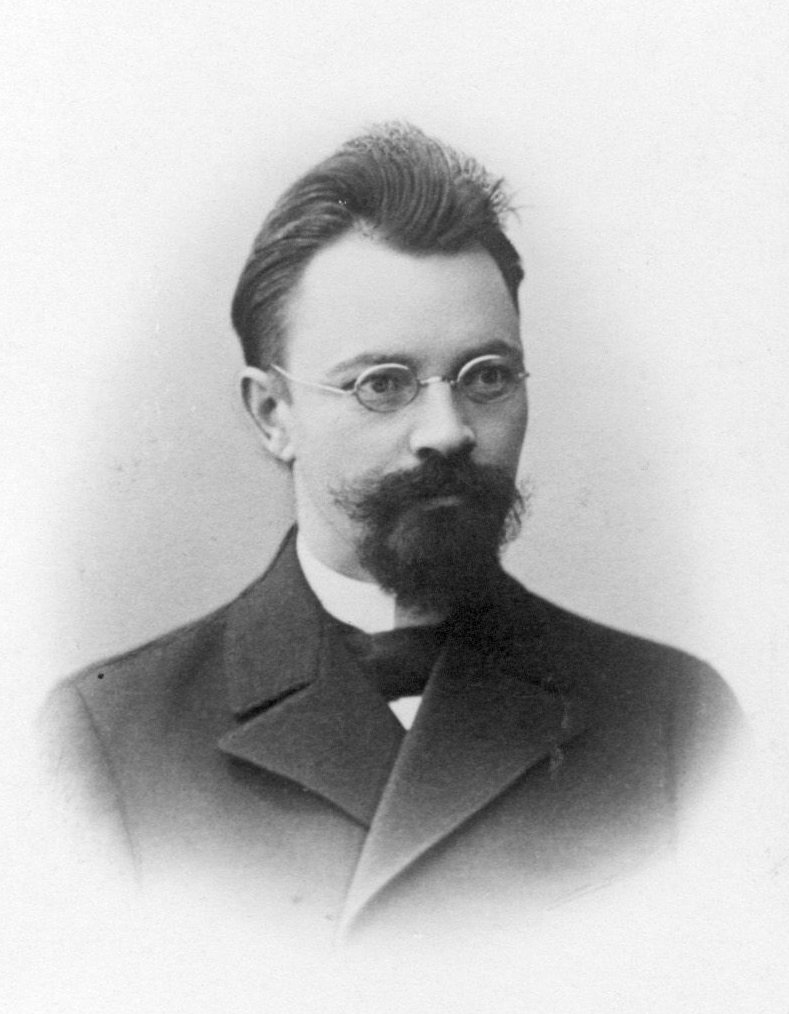
Villem Reiman

Villem Reiman (9 March 1861 Suure-Kõpu Parish – 25 May 1917 Kolga-Jaani) was an Estonian activist, historian, clergyman.

In 1887 he graduated from Tartu University in religion.

From 1890 to 1917 he was a pastor at Kolga-Jaani congregation.

He was one of the founders of Estonian Students' Society (in 1886 its chairman). He was one of the founders of Estonian Literary Society (from 1907 to 1914 its chairman). He was one of the founders of Estonian National Museum in 1909.

== Publications ==
- Eesti Piibli ümberpanemise lugu (1889)
- Eduard Ahrens (1894)
- Eesti kodu. Eesti ajaloost (1894)
- Kuidas priius meile tuli (1895)
- Eesti piibli kujunemislugu (1898)
- Karskuse mõte (1907)
- Kivid ja kirbud (1907)
- Jaan Jungi elulugu (1910)
- Jaan Adamson (1913)
- Eesti ajalugu (1920)
- Mis meist saab? Villem Reiman. Compiled by H. Runnel; edited by S. Ombler (2008)
- Eesti rahva haridusejärg muistse iseseisvuse ja ordu ajal. Friedrich Amelung ja Villem Reiman (2010)
- Ajaloo veskid. Villem Reiman. Compiled by H. Runnel; edited by S. Ombler (2012)
