= Mylivtsi =

Rural locality in Ternopil Oblast, Ukraine

Mylivtsi Милівці
- Location in Ternopil Oblast
- Coordinates: 48°52′59″N 25°49′12″E
- Country: Ukraine
- Oblast: Ternopil Oblast
- Raion: Chortkiv Raion
- Hromada: Nahirianka Hromada
- First mentioned: 1424
- Time zone: UTC+2 (EET)
  - Summer (DST): UTC+3 (EEST)
- Postal code: 48563

Mylivtsi (Ukrainian: Милівці) is a village in Nahirianka rural hromada, Chortkiv Raion, Ternopil Oblast, Ukraine.

== History ==
The first written mention of the village is from 1424.

== Religion ==
- Church of the Resurrection (1910, brick)
- Roman Catholic church (1863)
