= Ulashkivtsi =

Rural locality in Ternopil Oblast, Ukraine

Coordinates: 48°54′02″N 25°49′32″E

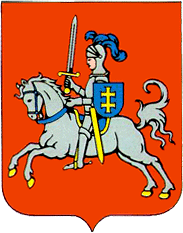

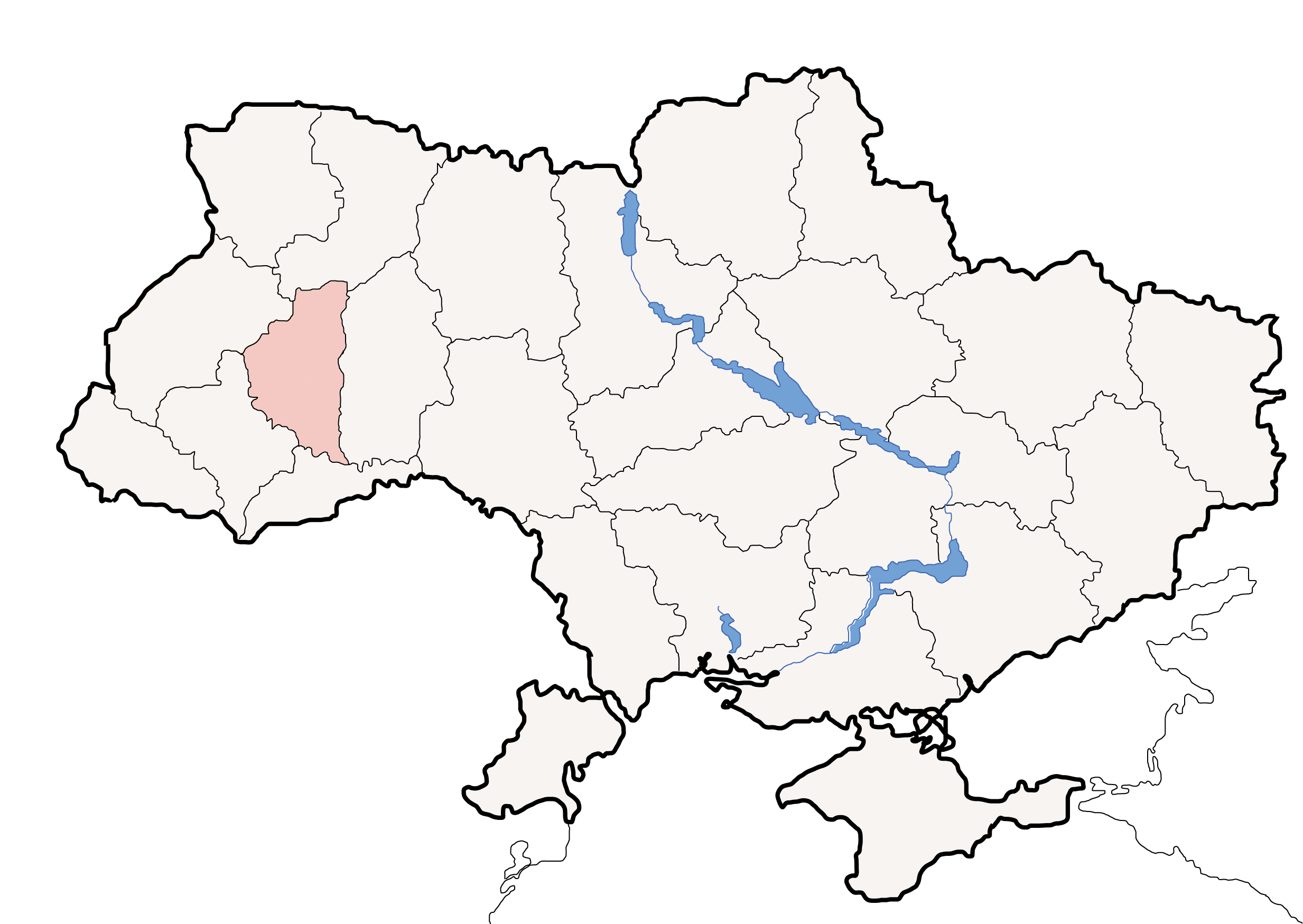
Ternopil Oblast is located in Ukraine.

Ulashkivtsi (Ukrainian: Улашківці; Polish: Ułaszkowce; Yiddish: לאַשקעוויץ, romanized: Lashkevitz; Hebrew: אולאשקובצה, romanized: 'Ulashkovtse) is a village located at the Seret River in Chortkiv Raion (district) of Ternopil Oblast (province in western Ukraine. It belongs to Nahirianka rural hromada, one of the hromadas of Ukraine. Pop. 1,145.

== Names ==
Ulashkivtsi is also known as Ulaszkowce, Ulashkovtse, Ulashkovtsy, Ułaszkowce, and Ulaskowce. Its Austrian-Polish name was Leszkowitz (pronounced Leshkovitz).

== History ==
First mentioned in 1464 the village belonged to the Kamieniec (Kamyanets-Podilskyi) county (powiat) in 16th century and was famous for the trade fairs being held there.

The Basilian Uniate monastery of John the Baptist was built there in early-18th century (sources give 1724 and 1738 as the foundation year.) The monastery holds two thaumaturgic icons: of the Most Holy Virgin and of John the Baptist.

There is also a unique geological monument of nature, archeology and history of the left bank of Middle Transnistria grotto of Saint Onuphrius.
