= Stanisław Stempowski =

Polish-Ukrainian politician

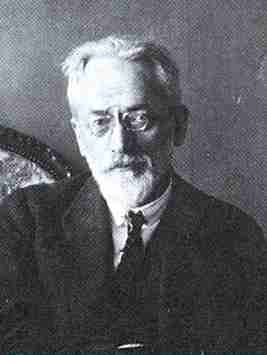
Stanisław Stempowski

Stanisław-Adam Stempowski (27 January 1870 – 11 January 1952) was a Polish-Ukrainian politician and Grand Master of the National Grand Lodge of Poland.

== Early life ==
Stempowski was born on 27 January 1870 Huta Czernielewiecka, Podolia (then Russian Empire). According to his biography, he grew up in a multilingual environment where he his first language was Ukrainian, and considered himself as much as a Pole as a Ukrainian. He was educated in Krzemieniec (1879 – 1888) and studied in Dorpat (1888–1892). During this time, he was involved in socialist underground activities, for which he was briefly imprisoned. After graduation, he initially moved to Warsaw, where he published the left-wing intellectual journal "Ogniwo", but it was shut down by Russian censorship and he was replaced under police supervision and so he returned to Huta Czernielewiecka. There, he worked as a landowner, but was still involved in politics privately. He was critical of the Podoloian Polish nobility, who he saw as arrogant and politically blind, and he started formulating ideas about a Polish-Ukrainian cooperation.

During the October Revolution, his family estate in Huta Czernielewiecka was destroyed, but he survived with the help of the local Ukrainian peasants. He then became an envoy of Józef Piłsudski after World War I. Stanisław Stempowski then served as a minister in several cabinets of the Ukrainian People's Republic (UNR) in 1920, headed by Isaak Mazepa, Viacheslav Prokopovych, and Andriy Livytskyi. In this role, he helpeed create the Treaty of Warsaw, which established a military-economical alliance between the UNR and the Second Polish Republic. Following the Treaty of Riga, he helped hide Symon Petliura in Poland until 1923. He was also a minister in the government of the UNR in exile, until January 1922. He then moved to Warsaw to work as a librarian, and from 1924 to 1939 was Head of the Library of the Ministry of Agriculture and Agrarian Reforms, where he became an associate with Ludwik Krzywicki.

At the end of 1921 he entered Freemasonry, and was a Grand Master of the National Grand Lodge of Poland (1926–1928). He left Masonry on 19 March 1938, fearing the anti-Masonic policy of the Polish government. After his withdrawal from politics, he worked on his memoir entitled "Pamiętniki 1870–1914", however his original typescripts were burned during the Warsaw Uprising, but an original manuscript was recovered after World War II. He published these memoirs in 1953, which was heavily censored to remove text about 1914 to 1920, and he softened his anti-Russian tone. They were republished in 2026 uncensored.

== See also ==
- List of Freemasons
- Paulin Święcicki
