= Stara Yahilnytsia =

Stara Yahilnytsia Стара Ягільниця
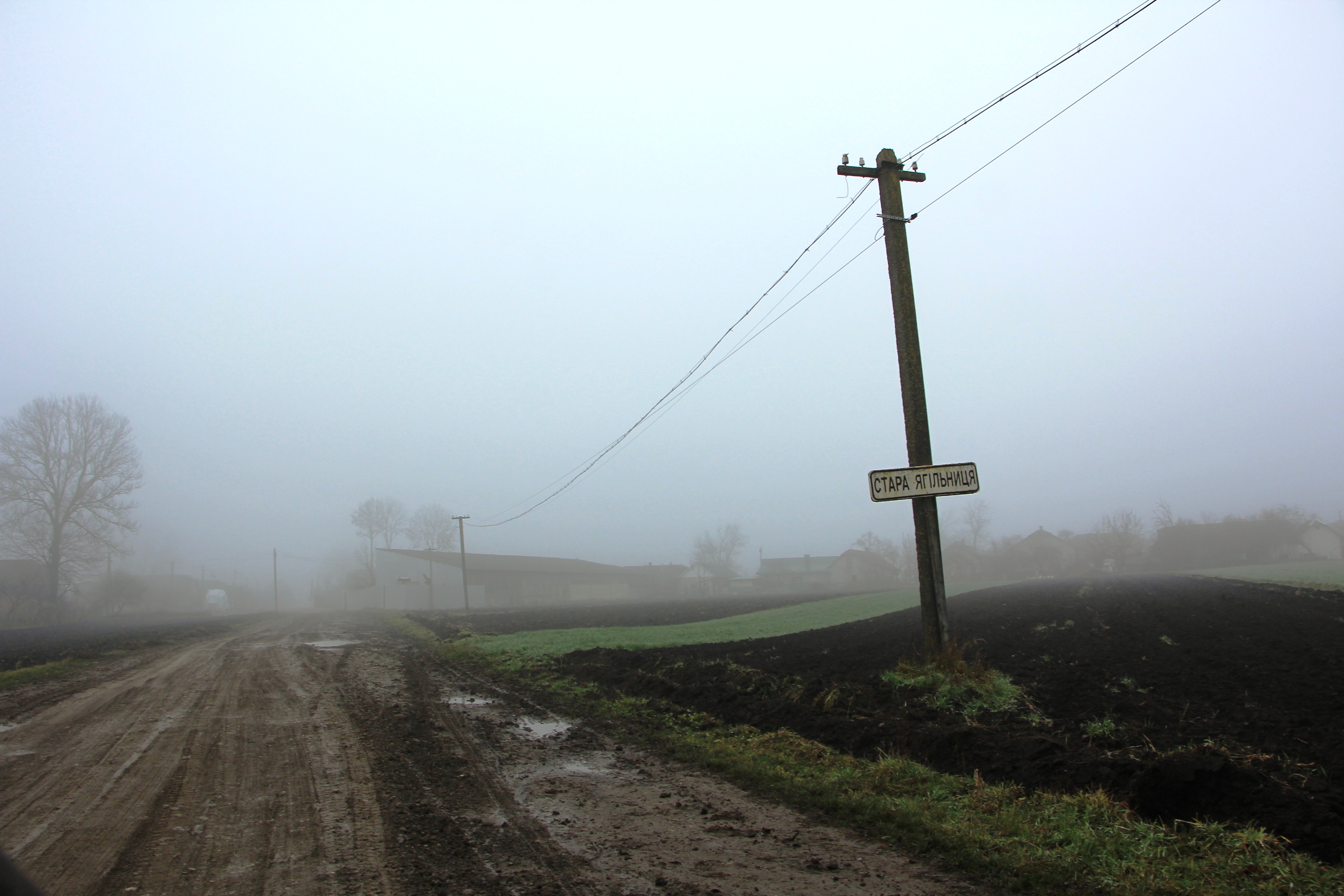
- Roadside sign at the entrance to the village

- Location in Ternopil Oblast
- Coordinates: 48°58′43″N 25°41′38″E
- Country: Ukraine
- Oblast: Ternopil Oblast
- Raion: Chortkiv Raion
- Hromada: Hahirianka village hromada

Population (2018)
  - Total: 509
- Time zone: UTC+2 (EET)
  - Summer (DST): UTC+3 (EEST)
- Postal code: 48540

Stara Yahilnytsia (Ukrainian: Стара Ягільниця, Polish: Jagielnica Stara) is a village in Ukraine, Ternopil Oblast, Chortkiv Raion, Hahirianka village hromada. The first written mention dates back to 1477.

== History ==
According to legend, the name of the village comes from the name of Jagail, the progenitor of the Jagiellonian dynasty, who owned these lands. According to other versions, the name is derived from the word Yagil the Cossacks used to call a stop off.

In 1785 there were 695 inhabitants.

== Religion ==
- Church of the Presentation of the Blessed Virgin Mary (UGCC; 1794; wooden; rebuilt in 1989)

== People from Stara Yahilnytsia ==
- Stefan Hrytskiv (1935–2022), Ukrainian orthopedic surgeon, public figure, publicist
- Teofil Kostruba (monastic name: Teodosii; 1907–1943), Ukrainian historian, local historian, publicist, editor, Basilian monk (1940)
