= Shulhanivka =

Rural locality in Ternopil Oblast, Ukraine

Shulhanivka Шульганівка
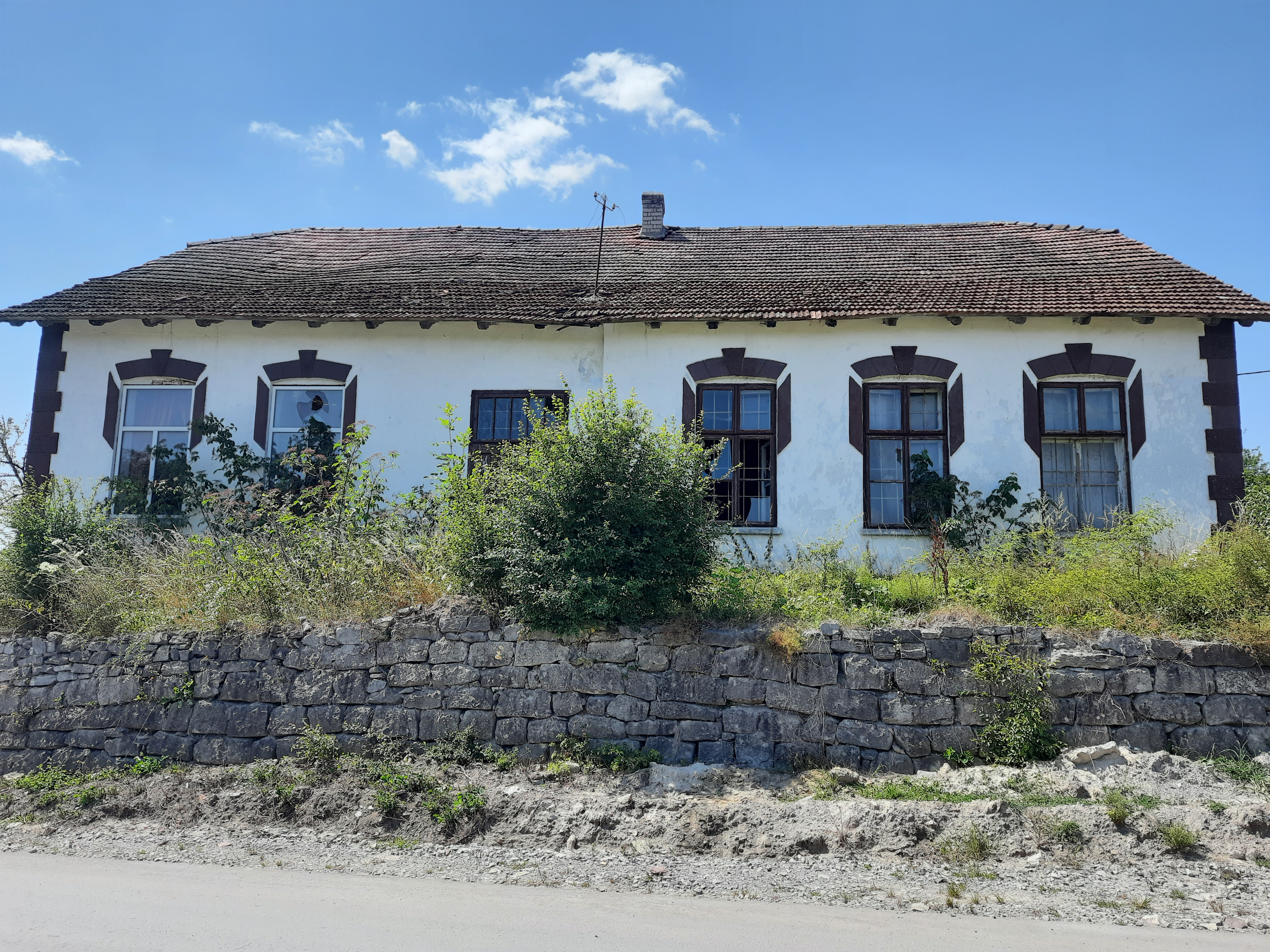

- Location in Ternopil Oblast
- Coordinates: 48°57′20″N 25°42′49″E
- Country: Ukraine
- Oblast: Ternopil Oblast
- Raion: Chortkiv Raion
- Hromada: Nahirianka Hromada
- Time zone: UTC+2 (EET)
  - Summer (DST): UTC+3 (EEST)
- Postal code: 48509

Shulhanivka (Ukrainian: Шульганівка) is a village in Nahirianka rural hromada, Chortkiv Raion, Ternopil Oblast, Ukraine

== History ==
The village dates back to at least the 17th century.

== Religion ==
- Saint Michael church (UGCC, 1878–1883, stone; painted by Kornylo Ustianovych), bell tower (1905)
- Holy Resurrection Monastery of the OCU (founded in 2013, feast day is the first Sunday after Holy Pentecost)

== People ==
- Olena Havrylko (1890–1967), Ukrainian educator, artist, public figure
- Liuba Haiovska (pseudonym "Ruta"; 1923–1954), Ukrainian participant in the national liberation struggle
- Volodymyr Maksymiv (1928–2003), Ukrainian businessman
- Volodymyr Mykuliak (1921–1995), Ukrainian scientist in the field of surgery, Doctor of Medical Sciences, teacher, public figure
- Bohdan Savkiv (born 1933), Ukrainian businessman, scientist, inventor
