= Lviv Academic Gymnasium =

Coordinates: 49.8349°N 24.0123°E

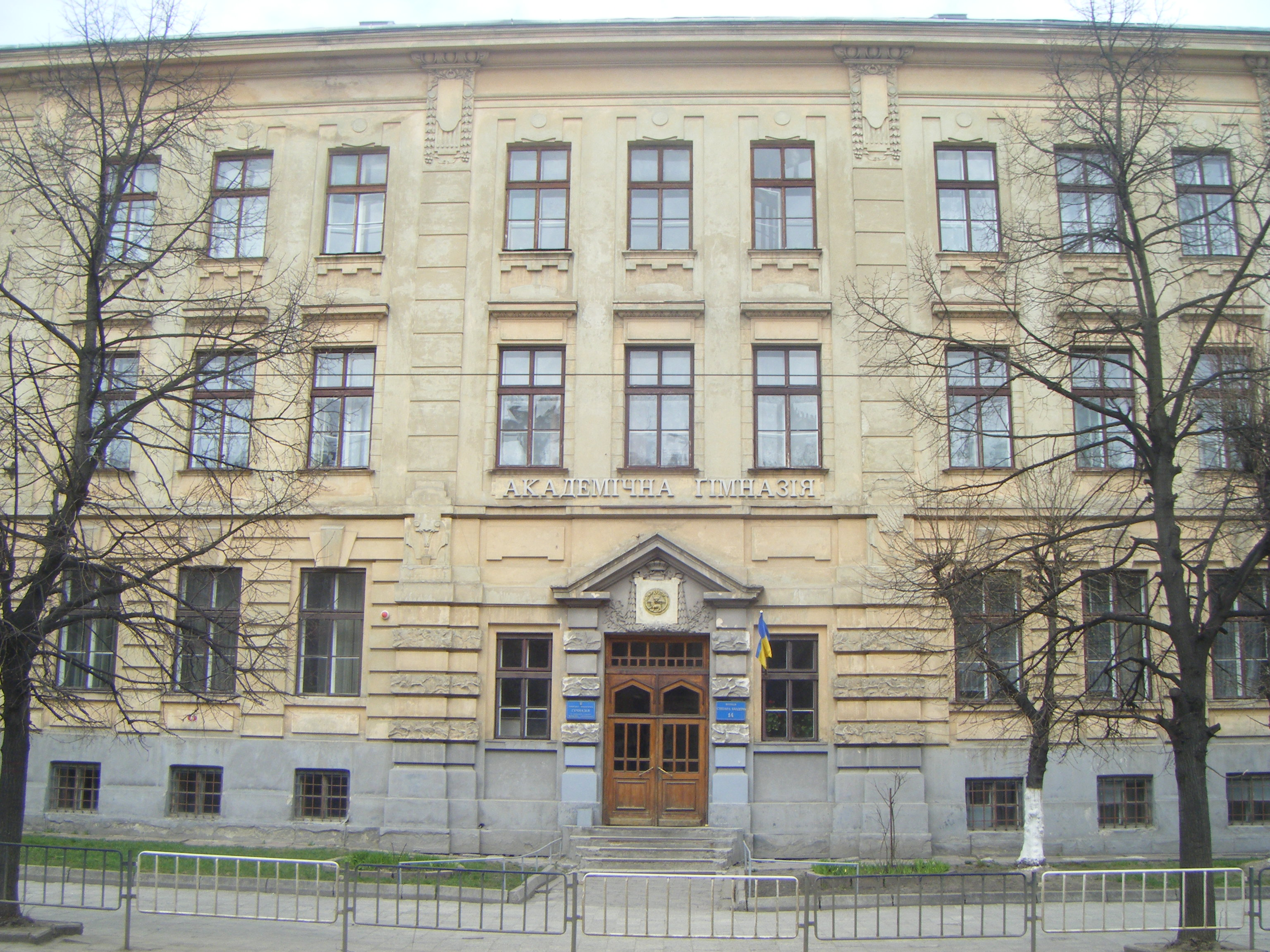
Lviv Academic Gymnasium at National University "Lviv Polytechnic"

Lviv Academic Gymnasium at the National University "Lviv Polytechnic" (Ukrainian: Львівська академічна гімназія) is the oldest high school in Lviv, Ukraine, founded on the order of Joseph II, Holy Roman Emperor, on October 24, 1784.

Lviv Academic Gymnasium is considered one of the best secondary schools in Ukraine.

Among the pupils of the gymnasium (at different times) were Mykola Ustyianovych, Yevhen Petrushevych, Stanyslav Lyudkevych, Yevhen Konovalets and Roman Shukhevych.

The building of the Gymnasium located on the street Stepan Bandera, 14 on the left of the main building of Lviv Polytechnic. Vasyl Il'nyts'ky was the first director of gymnasium.

== Faculty members ==
- Paulin Święcicki, a Ukrainian language instructor from Kiev Governorate
