= Nahirianka rural hromada =

Rural hromada in Ternopil Oblast, Ukraine

Nahirianka rural hromada Нагірянська сільська громада
- hromada
- Location within Ternopil Oblast Location within Ukraine
- Coordinates: 48°55′51″N 25°44′03″E
- Country: Ukraine
- Oblast: Ternopil Oblast
- Raion: Chortkiv Raion
- Administrative center: Nahirianka

Government
  - Hromada head: Ihor Kindrat

Area
  - Total: 181.7 km^{2} (70.2 sq mi)

Population (2022)
  - Total: 8,478
- Rural settlements: 1
- Villages: 11
- Website: nagiriyankasr.gov.ua

Nahirianka rural territorial hromada (Ukrainian: Нагірянська територіальна громада, romanized: Nahirianska silska terytorialna hromada) is a hromada in Ukraine, in the Chortkiv Raion of Ternopil Oblast. The administrative center is the village of Nahirianka. Its population is 8,478 (2022 estimate)

== History ==
It was formed on 1 December 2020 by the merger of Zabolotivka, Kapustyntsi, Mylivtsi, Mukhavka, Nahirianka, Sosulivka, Stara Yahilnytsia, Ulashkivtsi, Shulhanivka, Yahilnytsia village councils of Chortkiv Raion.

== Settlements ==
The hromada consists of 1 rural settlement (Nahirianka) and 11 villages:

- Dolyna
- Zabolotivka
- Kapustyntsi
- Mylivtsi
- Mukhavka
- Sosulivka
- Stara Yahilnytsia
- Cherkavshchyna
- Ulashkivtsi
- Shulhanivka
- Yahilnytsia
