= Volhynian dialect =

Volhynian dialect (Ukrainian: Волинський говір) is a dialect of Ukrainian language spoken around the historical region of Volhynia in the northern half of western Ukraine. It belongs to the Southwestern group of Ukrainian dialects.

== Territory and subdivisions ==
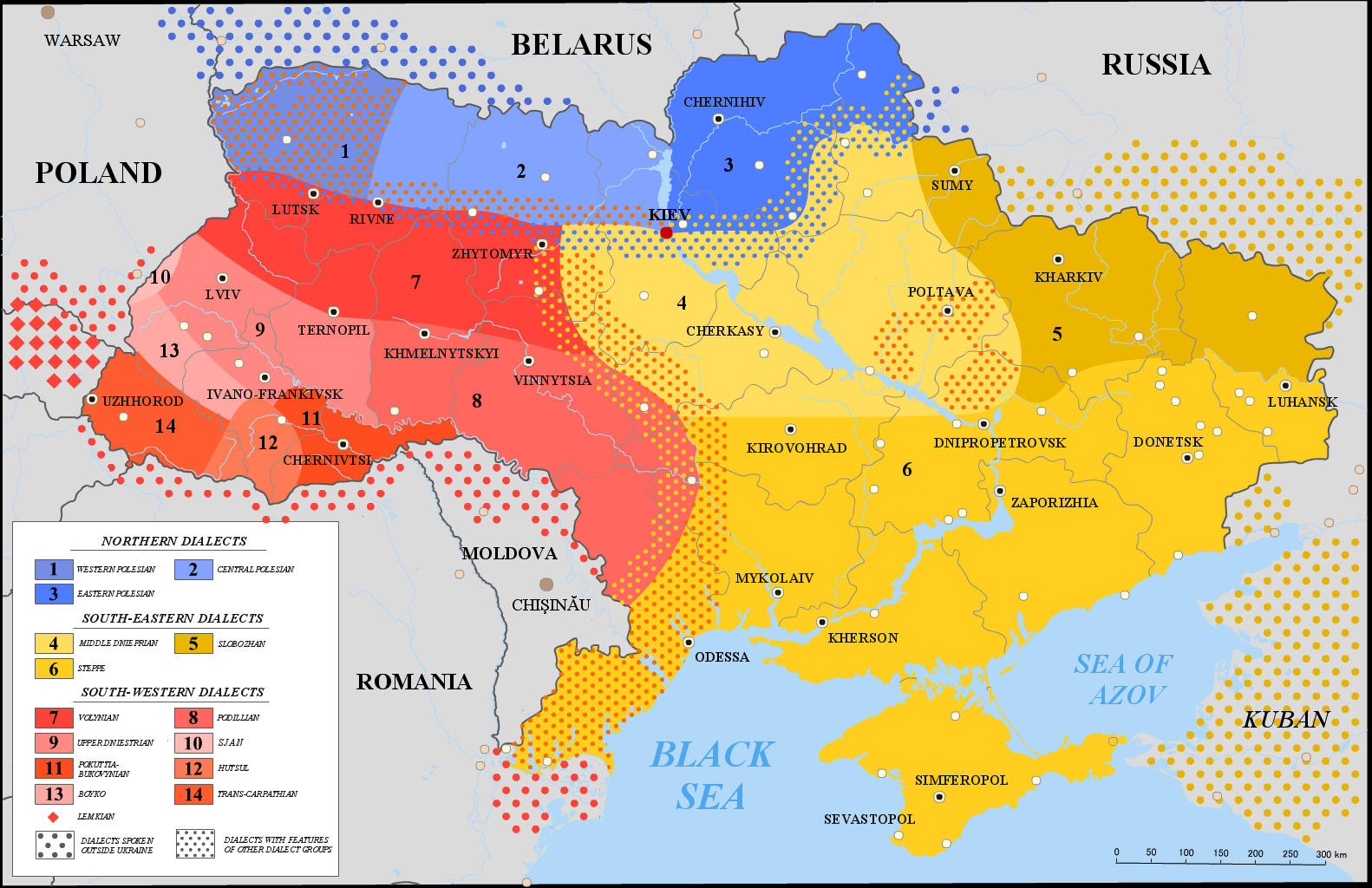
Map of Ukrainian dialects: Volhynian dialect is marked with no. 7.

The territory where Volhynian dialect is spoken borders Western Polesian and Central Polesian dialect in the north, Middle Dnieper dialect in the east and Upper Dniestrian and Podolian dialect in the south. Its spread in the west is generally limited by the Ukrainian-Polish border. The southern and eastern borders of the dialect area are limited by the line Sokal-Dubno-Zbarazh-Koziatyn-Zhytomyr.

Volhynian dialect can be divided into northern and southern subdialects approximately along the line Horokhiv - Shepetivka - Berdychiv, as well as into eastern and western subdialects along the line of Styr river. Northern varieties share many common elements with Polesian dialects, southern varieties - with Podolian and Dniestrian dialects. Western Volhynian subdialects have many similarities with Dniestrian varieties, and some linguists classify them as a separate dialect.

== Main features ==
Volhynian dialect can be seen as transitional between Northern and Southern Ukrainian dialects. It shows numerous similarities to standard Ukrainian literary language and Southeastern Ukrainian dialects.

=== Phonetics ===
- In western Volhynian subdialects [i] in place of the ethymological [o] can be replaced with [u], [ɪ]: стил [stɪɫ], столýў [stoˈɫuu̯], ни́чка [ˈnɪt͡ʃkɐ] (standard Ukrainian - стіл [sʲtʲiɫ], столів [stoˈlʲiu̯], нічка [ˈnʲit͡ʃkɐ]);
- especially in western subdialects, the original [ɛ] after certain consonants is pronounced as [ɑ]: трáба [ˈtrɑbɐ], цáгла [ˈt͡sɑɦɫɐ], шáстий [ˈʃɑstɪi̯], по сáлах (standard Ukrainian - треба [ˈtrɛbɐ], цегла [ˈt͡sɛɦɫɐ], шостий [ˈʃɔstɪi̯], по селах); in southwestern dialects [a] after palatalized consonants and sibilants may also get replaced with [ɛ]: ч’éсом [ˈt͡ʃʲɛsom], жел’[ʒɛlʲ] (literary Ukrainian - часом [ˈt͡ʃɑsom], жаль [ʒɑlʲ]);
- in some western varieties phoneme [ɪ] in stressed position turns into [e]: сéла [ˈseɫɐ], звéсока [ˈzʋesokɐ], кудéс’ [kʊˈdesʲ] (standard Ukrainian - сила [ˈsɪɫɐ], звисока [ˈzʋɪsokɐ], кудись [kʊˈdɪsʲ]);
- in southern Volhynian dialects unstressed [o] in some cases turns into [ʊ]: гуолýпка [ɦoʊˈɫupkɐ], куожýх [koʊʒux], йумý [jʊˈmu], дорóгуйу [doˈrɔɦʊjʊ] (standard Ukrainian - голубка [ɦoˈɫubkɐ], кожух [koˈʒux], йому [joˈmu], дорогою [doˈrɔɦojʊ]);
- as a rule, endings of 3rd person singular and plural in Volhynian dialect are palatalized (-ть, -ць); but in some western varieties the word-final [t] is palatalized only in imperative mood;
- in part of western and northern varieties consonants [ɦ], [k], [x] may be palatalized before [i]: рýкі [ˈrukʲi], нóгі [ˈnɔɦʲi], хíтрий [ˈxʲitrɪi̯] (standard Ukrainian - руки [ˈrukɪ], ноги [ˈnɔɦɪ], хитрий [ˈxɪtrɪi̯]).
- presence of rounded monophthongs in northern varieties;
- lack of palatalized [r].

=== Morphology ===
- In Volhynian dialects the particle -ся does not change its position in respect to the verb;
- presence of lengthened consonants in neutrum nouns (життя); but in most southern varieties there is a lack of gemination in endings of single nouns like зілля (з’íл’а, нас’íн’а, жит’á); in western varieties forms with gemination and word-final [ɛ] are widespread: з’íл’:е, жит’:é, пíрйе, подвíрйе;
- Instrumental case endings of feminine nouns are generally -ою, -ею; however, in western varieties ending of feminine single nouns in instrumental case are -оў, -ом (дорóгоў, дни́ноў, рукóў, ногóм) unlike standard Ukrainian -ойу/-ою;
- in western Volhynian subdialects masculine plural nouns in dative and locative frequently have endings -ем, -ex: жін’цéм, коувал’éм, на жін’ц’éх, на коувал’éх (standard Ukrainian - женцям, ковалям, на женцях, на ковалях); in instrumentative - -ема: жін’ц’'éма', коувал’éма (standard Ukrainian женцями, ковалями);
- in western Volhynian subdialects long endings of neutral adjectives are widespread: дрібнóйе, зелáнуйе (standard Ukrainian - дрібне, зелене); some possessive adjectives in those varieties may have parallel forms: попóвий лан, попіў син; endings of genitive and instrumental in feminine adjectives may take the form -ейі, -ейу: моулоудéйі, моулоудéйу, старéйі, старéйу (standard Ukrainian молодої, молодою, старої, старою);
- a distinct feature of Volhynia dialect is the presence of shortened forms of feminine pronouns are widespread: сéйі, тéйі, мéйі, твéйі, сéйу, тéйу, мéйу, свéйу, твéйу (standard Ukrainian forms - цієї, тієї, моєї, твоєї, цією, тією, моєю, своєю, твоєю);
- lack of word-initial [n] in certain pronouns: до йóго, з йéйу, ў йéйі (standard Ukrainian - до нього, з нею, у неї);
- transition of [d], [z], [t], [s] into [d͡ʒ], [ʒ], [t͡ʃ], [ʃ] in singular 1st person verbs: хóджу, хóжу, крýчу, прóшу (like in standard Ukrainian);
- in western Volhynian varieties complex forms of past tense verbs are used along with simple ones: ходи́вім, ходи́віс, ходи́лис’мо, ходи́лис’те etc.
