= Middle Dnieprian dialect =

Dialect of Ukrainian language

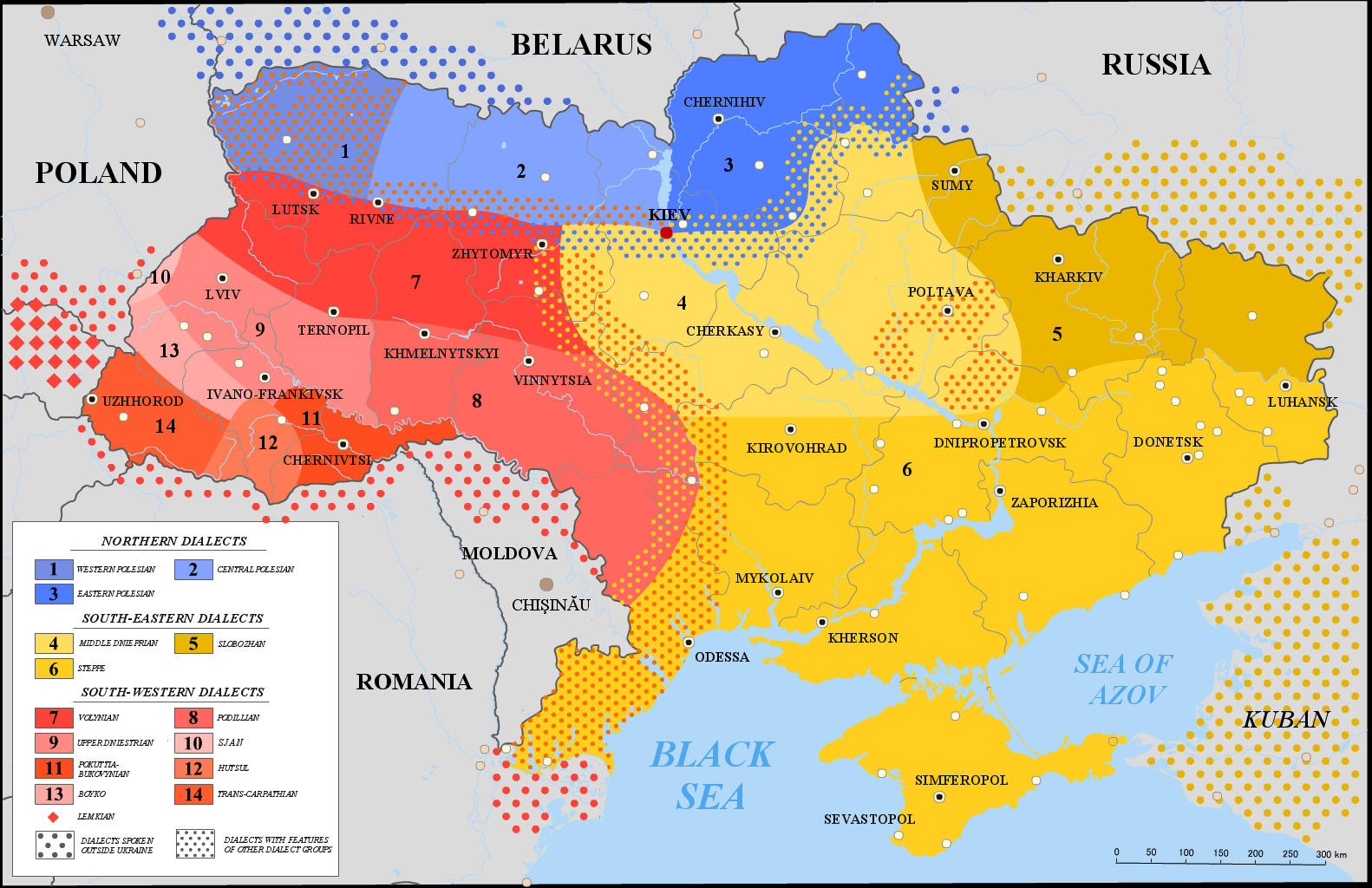
Middle Dnieprian dialect (no. 4) on the map of Ukrainian dialects

Middle Dnieprian dialect (Ukrainian: Середньонаддніпрянський говір) is a dialect of the Ukrainian language spoken in the historical region of Dnieper Ukraine. Linguistically it belongs to the Southeastern group of Ukrainian dialects. Middle Dnieprian is spoken in southern parts of Kyiv region, southwestern parts of Sumy region, in most of the territory of Cherkasy and Poltava regions, as well as in northern parts of Kirovohrad and Dnipropetrovsk regions. The territory where the dialect is widespread borders Central and Eastern Polesian dialects in the north, Slobozhan dialect in the east, Steppe dialect in the south, as well as Podolian and Volhynian dialects in the west. Structurally Middle Dnieprian dialect is close to standard literary Ukrainian language.

== Main features ==
=== Phonetics ===
- Like in other Southeastern dialects, і and у may be replaced with й and в respectively;
- labial consonants [p], [b], [v], [m], [f] never undergo palatalization;
- change of unstressed vowels [ɛ]>[e], [ɪ] (селó [seˈɫɔ], пóпил [ˈpɔpɪɫ], пóгриб [ˈpɔɦrɪb]), in some varieties [ɛ]>[ɐ] (тапéр [tɐˈpɛr], манé [mɐˈnɛ]); [o]>[ʊ], [u] (before stressed syllable with [i]/[ɪ], [u]: об’íд [ʊˈbʲid], муги́ла [muˈɦɪɫɐ]);
- transition of original [o] into [e], [ɪ] or [ɐ]: либодá [ɫɪboˈdɑ], лескотáти [ɫeskoˈtɑtɪ], пагáний [pɐˈɦɑnɪi̯], ганчáр [ɦɐnˈt͡ʃɑr];
- nasalized [ę]>[i] (колóдíз’ [koˈɫɔdʲizʲ]), [ě]>[o] (хрон [xrɔn]);
- use of prothetic consonants [w], [ɦ], [j]: ворáти [woˈrɑtɪ], Гадéса (Odesa), йіроплáн (aeroplane); alternatively, elimination of word-initial consonants in some roots: орóх [oˈrɔx] (standard Ukrainian pronunciation - горох [ɦoˈrɔx]);
- palatalization in consonants [d], [t], [z], [s], [n] followed by [i]<[o], [e] (except Poltava and some Right-bank subdialects);
- presence of palatalized [tʲ], [t͡sʲ], [rʲ], in some varieties also [ʒʲ], [ʃʲ], [t͡ʃʲ] (before [a]): р’áма [ˈrʲɑmɐ], гр’ад [ɦrʲɑd], гончáр’ [ɦɔnˈt͡ʃɑrʲ], лош’а [ɫɔˈʃʲɑ], волóч’ат’ [ʋoˈɫɔt͡ʃʲɐtʲ];
- transition of [d͡z]>[z] (звін [zʋʲin], зéркало [ˈzɛrkɐɫo]), but in some varieties the opposite process takes place (дз’аб [d͡zʲɑb], дзалéний [d͡zɐˈɫɛnɪi̯]); [d͡ʒ]>[ʒ] (хóжу [ˈxɔʒʊ], сижý [sɪˈʒu]); [ɡ]>[ɦ] (дзи́га [ˈd͡zɪɦɐ], гýдзик [ˈɦud͡zɪk]); [f]>[x], [kʋ], [xʋ], [p], [ʋ], [m] (квартýх [kʋɐrˈtux], хвáбрика [ˈxʋɑbrɪkɐ], хóрма [ˈxɔrmɐ]);
- varying evolution of labial consonant + j: preservation (свйáто [ˈsʋjɑtɔ], жáбйачий [ˈʒɑbjɐt͡ʃɪi̯]); loss of [j] with palatalization of the preceding consonant (жаб’ачий [ˈʒɑbʲɐt͡ʃɪi̯]) or without it (свати́й [sʋɐˈtɪi̯]); replacement of [j] with epenthetic [nʲ] (полумн’а [ˈpɔɫʊmnʲɐ], мн’акий [mnʲɐˈkɪi̯]);
- change of [wn]>[mn], [t͡ʃn]>[ʃn]: рíмний [ˈrʲimnɪi̯], помішни́к [pomʲiʃˈnɪk];
- in some words [tʲ]>[kʲ]/[c]: к’існи́й [cisˈnɪi̯], к’íсто [ˈcistɔ];
- in some Left-bank varieties consonants are devoiced before other unvoiced consonants or in word-final position: одказати [otkɐˈzɑte].

=== Morphology ===
- in some varieties nouns are declined according to rules of the "hard" group: товáришові, кон’óві, гáйом, топóл’ойу;
- ending -и in genitive of single feminine nouns: сóли, рáдости;
- alternative endings of feminine plural nouns in genitive: баб - бабíў, сестéр - сестри́ў, стріх - стрíхоў etc.;
- parallel forms of pronouns та, ц’а in genitive and instrumental cases: тóйі, тéйі, тíйі - тійéйі; тíйу, тóйу, тéйу - тійéйу; forms йім, на йóму, на йій are more frequently used than ним, на ній;
- parallel forms of possessive adjectives: мáтерини, материн’і;
- parallel forms of infinitive: ходи́ти, ходи́т’;
- in some varieties verbs in 3rd person present and future tense have parallel forms: хóде, хóдит’;
- parallel forms of 1st declension verbs in 3rd person singular with -j stem: слýха, зна - слýхайе, знáйе;
- alternative endings of verbs in plural: вóз’ат’ - вóз’ут’, тóч’ат’ - тóч’ут’;
- two forms of future tense: бýду роби́ти, робитиму.

== Subdialects ==
=== Northern subdialects ===
Northern Middle Dnieprian varieties are distinguished by following features:

- lack of transition in the etymological [o]>[u]: воз [ʋɔz], кóстка [ˈkɔstkɐ]. порóг [poˈrɔɦ], рáдост’ [ˈrɑdosʲtʲ] (standard literary Ukrainian - віз [ʋʲiz], кістка [ˈkʲistkɐ], поріг [poˈrʲiɦ], радість [ˈrɑdʲisʲtʲ]);
- lack of prothetic consonants: узóл [ʊˈzɔɫ], ýхо [ˈuxɔ] (standard Ukrainian - вузол [ˈwuzɔɫ], вухо [ˈwuxɔ]);
- prevalence of ending -у in dative of masculine single nouns: дýбу, гáйу (in other Middle Dnieprian varieties forms дубові, гаєві are prevalent);
- widespread usage of shortened adjective forms: краси́ви, молоди́ (standard Ukrainian - красивий, молодий);
- differing accentuation in certain words: рунó, см’іт’:á.

=== Poltava subdialects ===
Poltava subdialects have following distinguishing features:

- change of [ɪ] into [e]: чоботе [ˈt͡ʃɔbote]; before a stressed syllable - [e] into [i]: мінí [mʲiˈnʲi] (standard Ukrainian - чоботи [ˈt͡ʃɔbɔtɪ], мені [meˈnʲi]);
- presence of alveolar [l]: бул.á [bʊˈlɑ], мол.окó [moloˈkɔ], ходи́л.и [xoˈdɪlɪ] (standard Ukrainian - була [bʊˈɫɑ], молоко [moɫoˈkɔ], ходили [xoˈdɪɫɪ]);
- lack of palatalization in consonants [d], [t], [z], [s], [n] followed by [i]<[o], [e] (він ньіс — нести, but ніс — носа);
- endings -ім, -ix in dative and locative case of plural nouns with stress on the word stem: кóнім, на кóніх (standard Ukrainian - коням, на конях); parallel endings -ові, -ат-ові in dative of singular nouns with t-base: тел’óві, тел’áтові (standard Ukrainian - теляті);
- "soft" declension of adjectives: чóрн’ій, б’íл’íй, на гáрн’іх (standard Ukrainian - чорний, білий, на гарних);
- infinitives ending with unpalatalized [t]: ходи́т (in other Middle Dnieprian varieties - ходити, ходить);
- preposition від is more frequently present in the form од;
- use of dual number: два качура.

=== Right-bank subdialects ===
Right-bank subdialects exhibit the following distinguishing features:

- lack of palatalization in consonants [d], [t], [z], [s], [n] followed by [i]<[o], [e];
- differing accentuation in certain pronouns and numerals: мóго, твóго, тóго, однóго; stress on endings of verbs підé — підéм; parallel variants of accentuation in some nouns дрóва — дровá.

=== Southern subdialects ===
Southern Middle Dnieprian subdialects are distinguished by following features:

- differing accentuation in some words: вузóл [wʊˈzɔɫ] (standard Ukrainian - вýзол [ˈwuzoɫ]);
- preservation of [d], [t], [s], [z], [zd], [st] in single verb forms of 1st person: вóд’ý [woˈdʲu], крут’ý [krʊˈtʲu] (standard Ukrainian - воджу [woˈd͡ʒu], кручу [krʊˈt͡ʃu]).

== Lexical features ==
Some words typical for Middle Dnieprian dialect are:

Middle Dnieprian	Standard Ukrainian	English	Notes
клюйдерево (klyuydérevo)	дятел (dyátel)	woodpecker	literal translation - "peck on wood"
зборник (zbórnyk)	очіпок (ochípok)	ochipok (female headdress)	
пшінка, пшеничка (pshínka, pshenýchka)	кукурудза (kukurúdza)	maize	in literary Ukrainian пшінка means "millet porridge" and пшеничка is a diminutive for "wheat"
лелека, лелеґа (leléka, leléga)	чорногуз (chornohúz)	stork	the word лелека is present in standard literary Ukrainian, but absent in most other dialects except Middle Dnieprian
парок (parók)	куль (kul')	Sheaf of straw used for roofing	
мажáра (mazhára)	ма́жа (mázha)	a big cart used by chumaks	from Crimean Tatar macar - "Hungarian"
конóшок (konóshok)	мала дитина (malá dytýna)	a small child	
гайшáн (hayshán)	розбишака (rozbysháka)	an outlaw, unruly person	
вагани́ (vahaný)	ночви (nóchvy)	a kind of trough used for washing, mixing of dough etc.	
рíпа (rípa)	картопля (kartóplya)	potatoes	in standard Ukrainian ріпа means "turnip"

== In literature ==
Features of Middle Dnieprian dialect are present in historical and folklore sources, as well as in works by Ukrainian authors such as Ivan Kotliarevsky, Taras Shevchenko, Yevhen Hrebinka, Panas Myrny, Hryhir Tiutiunnyk and others.
