= Steppe dialect =

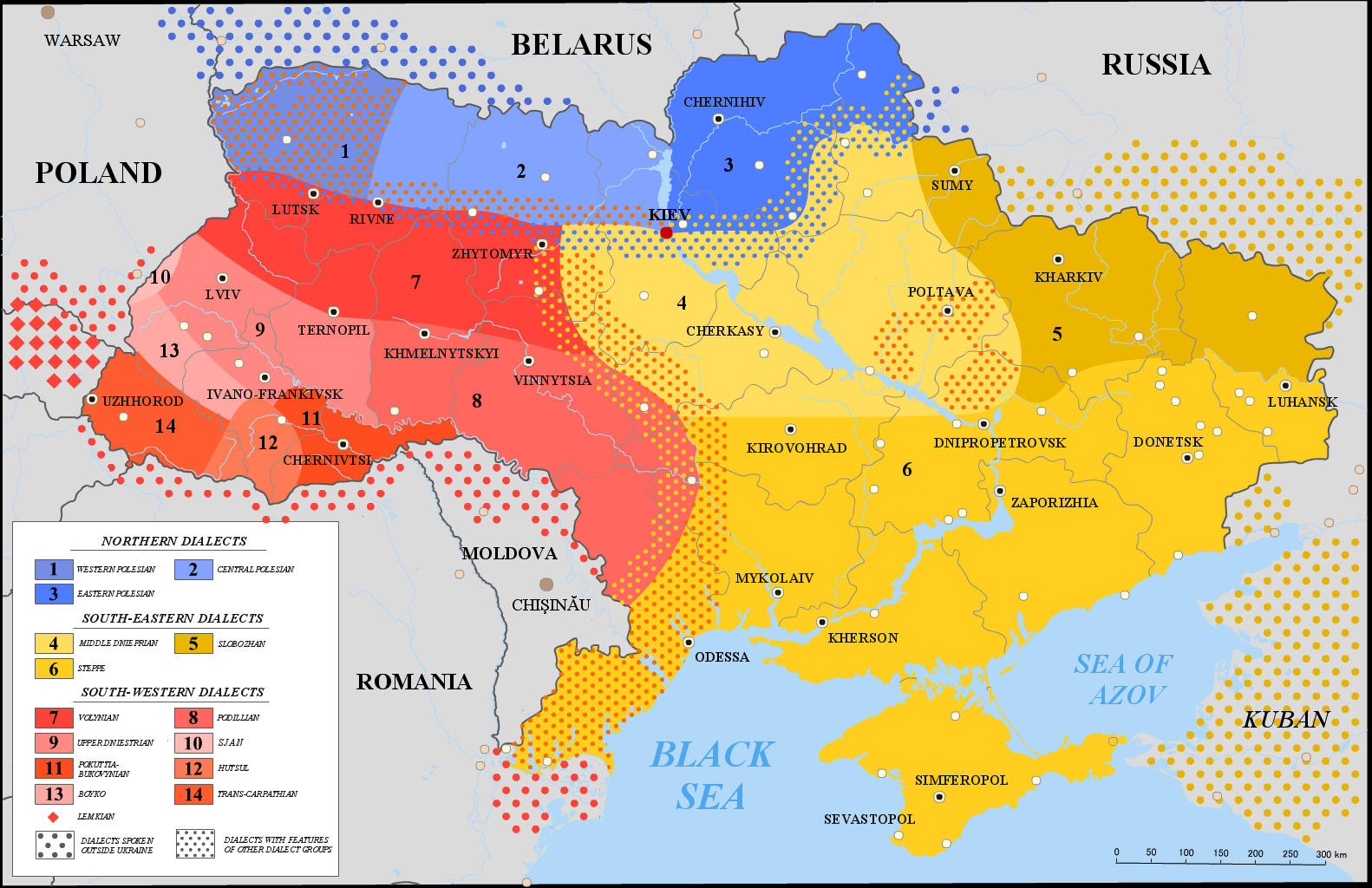
Steppe dialect (no. 6) on the map of Ukrainian dialects

Steppe dialect (Ukrainian: Степовий говір) belongs to the Southeastern group of Ukrainian dialects. Having formed in the 17–19th centuries, it is the youngest Ukrainian dialect, as well as the most widespread geographically.

== Geographic distribution ==
Steppe dialect is spoken in southern parts of Kirovohrad, Dnipropetrovsk and Luhansk oblasts, as well as in Zaporizhzhia, Donetsk, Kherson oblasts, Crimea, and parts of Odesa and Mykolaiv oblasts. Outside of Ukraine's borders speakers of Steppe dialect live in the Krasnodar Krai of Russia and in southeastern Romania (Danube Delta).

== History ==
The dialect was formed on the base of Middle Dnieprian and Slobozhan dialects with additional influence from Northern and Southwestern Ukrainian dialects, as well as from Russian, Bulgarian, Romanian, Serbian, Greek, German and other languages.

== Main features ==
=== Phonetics ===
Like in other Southeastern dialects, і and у may be replaced with й and в respectively. Consonants before [i]<[o],[e],[ě] may be palatalized or non-palatalized. Word-final phonemes [t͡s], [t], [r] are palatalized, but labial consonants [p], [b], [v], [m], [f] never undergo palatalization. There is no distinction between unstressed vowels [e] and [ɪ], sometimes also [o] and [u].

=== Morphology ===
Infinitive verbs frequently end with ть. Both simple and complex future forms exist (буду ходити, ходитиму). 3rd person singular verbs may take the form (він) хóде, рóбе; 1st person singular verbs - ходьу, мусьу; shortened forms of 3rd person verbs (він) пита, потопа.

=== Vocabulary ===
Among lexical features typical for the Steppe dialect is the use of words such as бакáй (bakáy) - "pothole", "pit", каби́ця (kabýtsia) - "open-air oven", кирд (kyrd) - "a large flock of sheep", ґард (gard) - "fishing hut", киргáн (kyrhán) - "ice pit or reservoir used for preservation of fish", вáда (váda) - "a trench used for irrigation of plants" etc.
