= Slobozhan dialect =

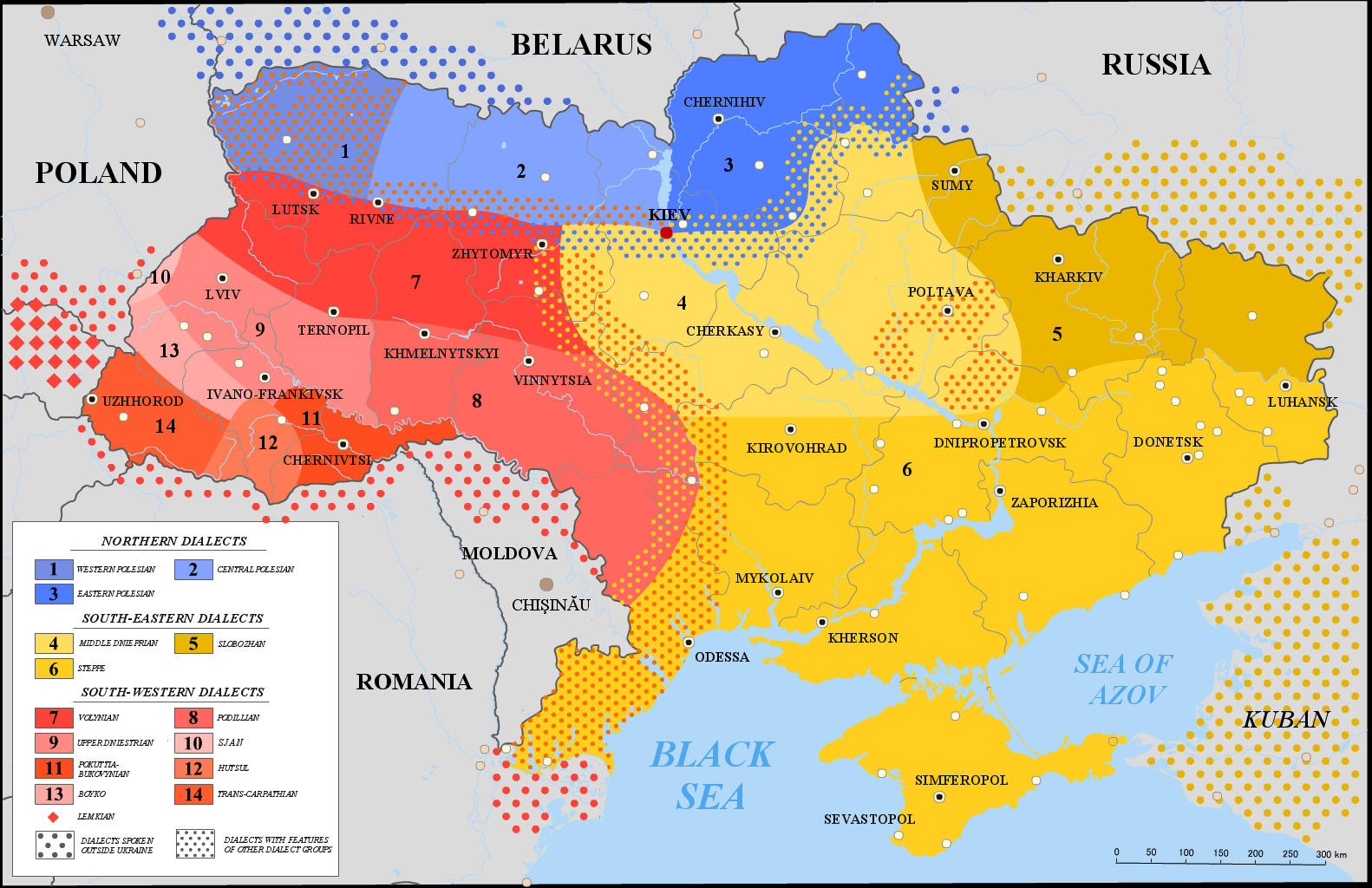
Slobozhan dialect (no. 5) among other Ukrainian dialects

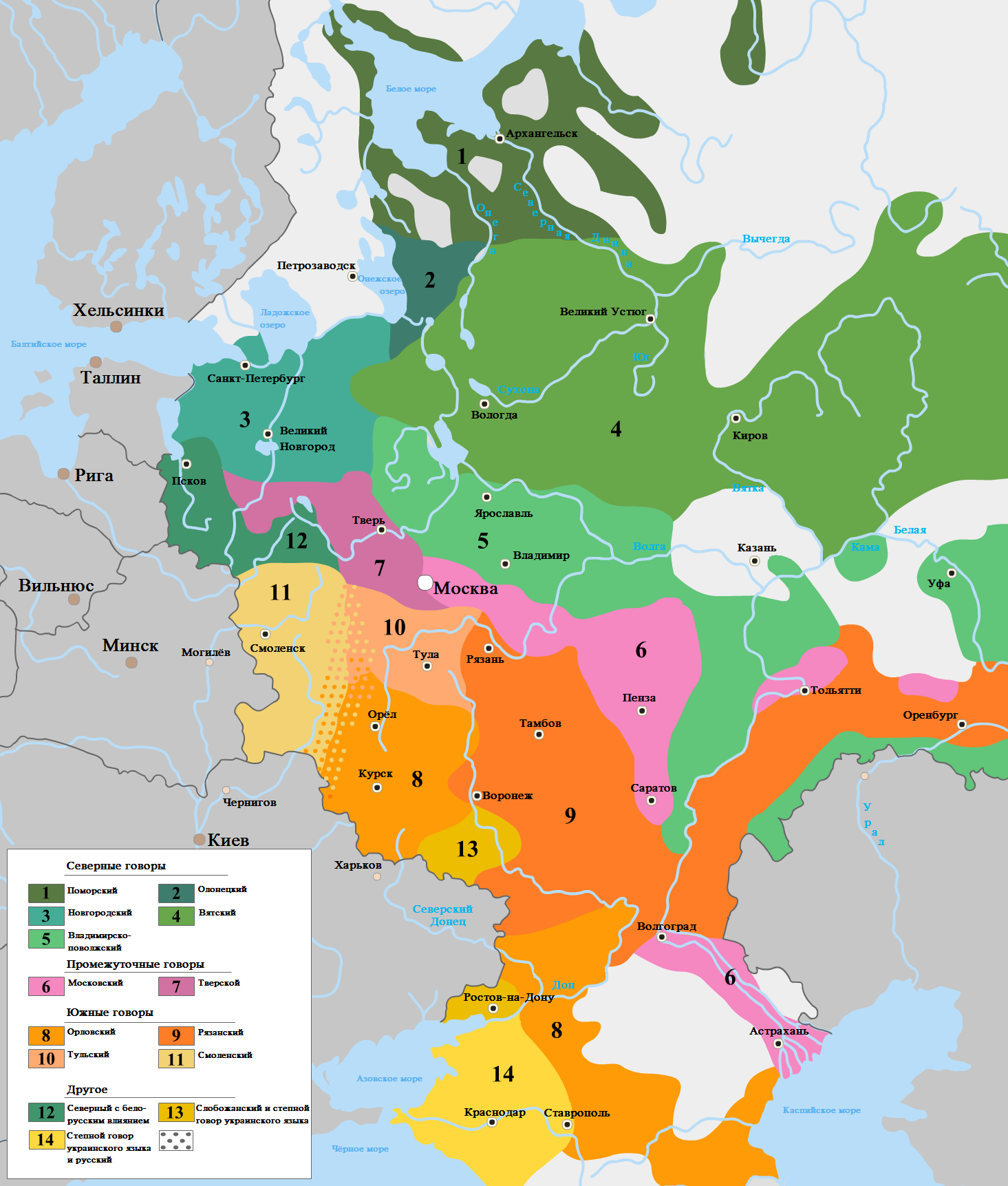
Spread of Sloboda Ukrainian dialect in Russia (No.13)

Slobozhan or Sloboda Ukrainian dialect (Ukrainian: Слобожанський говір), also known as Donets dialect (Ukrainian: Наддонецький говір) is a dialect of Ukrainian language spoken in the historical region of Sloboda Ukraine. It formed as a result of interaction between speakers of Middle Dnieprian, Eastern Polesian and Podolian dialects of Ukrainian, as well Southern Russian dialects, during the settlement of the area in the 16-17th centuries. Slobozhan dialect is classified among Southeastern Ukrainian dialects.

== Features ==
=== Phonetics ===
Slobozhan dialect is characterized by a frequent presence of palatalized [t͡ʃ] (очьима, нечьиста). Like in other Southeastern dialects, і and у may be replaced with й and в respectively. Consonants before [i]<[o],[e],[ě] may be palatalized or non-palatalized. Word-final phonemes [t͡s], [t], [r] are palatalized, but labial consonants [p], [b], [v], [m], [f] never undergo palatalization in final position. There is no distinction between unstressed vowels [e] and [ɪ], sometimes also between [o] and [u].

=== Morphology ===
Infinitive verbs frequently end with -ть. Both simple and complex future forms exist (буду ходити, ходитиму). 3rd person singular verbs may take the form (він) хóде, рóбе; 1st person singular verbs - ходьу, мусьу; shortened forms of 3rd person verbs (він) пита, потопа.

=== Grammar ===
Along with Poltava subdialect, Slobozhan is known to use dual number.

== Vocabulary ==
The dialect's vocabulary is significantly influenced by the Russian language.

=== Examples ===
Slobozhan	Standard Ukrainian	English
лівуша, лівшак (livúsha, livshák)	лівша, шульга (livshá, shulhá)	left-handed person
глушпей, глушпет (hlushpéy, hlushpét)	глухий (hlukhýi)	deaf person
огуд (ohúd)	огудиння (ohudýnnya)	stalk (plant stem)
ламанка (lámanka)	бительня (bytél'nya)	a piece of equipment used for breaking of flax or hemp fibers
кобушка (kobúshka)	глечик (hléchyk)	a clay jug
рига (rýha)	клуня (klúnya)	barn
хобіття (khobíttya)	полова (polóva)	chaff (waste)
степ, неудобиця (step, neudóbytsia)	цілина (tsilyná)	virgin soil
кобець, рябець (kóbets', ryábets')	яструб (yástrub)	sparrowhawk
відволож (vídvolozh)	відлига (vidlyha)	thaw
сіверко (síverko)	холодно (khólodno)	cold (about weather)
половіддя (polovíddya)	повінь (póvin')	flood
накидка, настільник (nakýdka, nastíl'nyk)	скатерка, скатертина (skáterka, skatertýna)	tablecloth
звід (zvid)	журавель (zhuravél')	shadoof
халаш (khálash)	повітка, сарай (povítka, saray)	shed (building)
