= Southeastern Ukrainian dialects =

Group of dialects of the Ukrainian language

- Південно-східне наріччя
- Region: Central, Eastern, and Southern Ukraine
- Language family: Indo-European: Slavic; East Slavic; Ukrainian; Southeastern Ukrainian dialects

Language codes
- ISO 639-3: –
- Glottolog: east2270
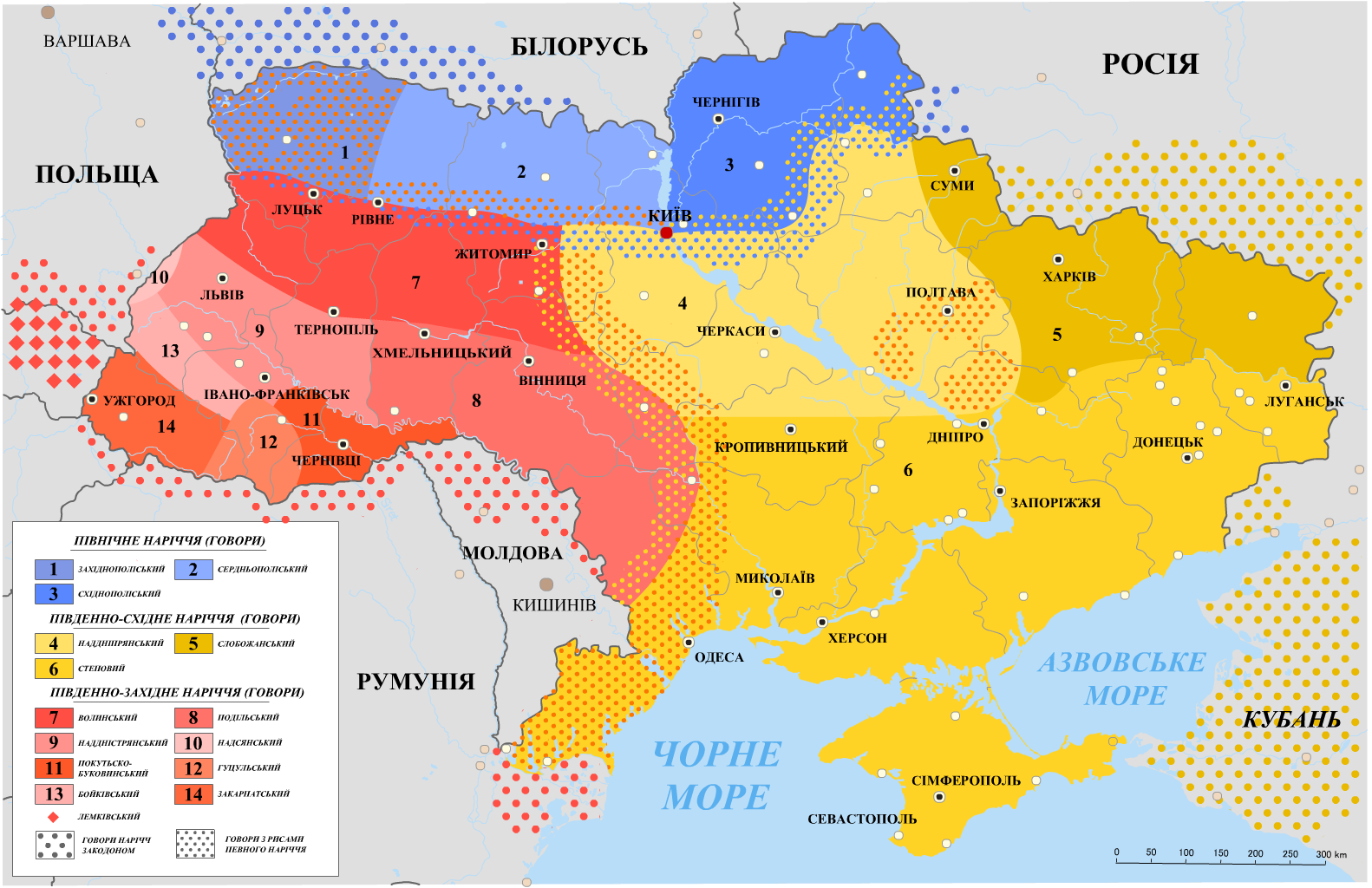
- Modern Ukrainian dialects. Southeastern Ukrainian is shown in yellow. Middle Dnieprian (4) Slobozhan (5) Steppe (6)

The Southeastern dialects (Ukrainian: Південно-східне наріччя, romanized: Pivdenno-skhidne narichchia), sometimes referred to as the Eastern or Central-Eastern dialects, are one of the three dialect groups of the Ukrainian language, alongside the Southwestern and Northern dialect groups.

== Geography ==
The areas where Southeastern dialects are spoken reach from the south of Kyiv and Sumy oblasts to the Black Sea and from the northern or western parts of Cherkasy, Kirovohrad, Mykolaiv, and Odesa oblasts to Ukraine's eastern border. They are also spoken in Crimea as well as in Belgorod, Kursk, Rostov, and Voronezh oblasts of Russia, and in parts of Kuban and Stavropol Krai.

Southeastern dialects are separated from Northern Ukrainian dialects by a transitional zone starting north of the line Bila Tserkva-Korsun-Shevchenkivskyi-Kaniv-Zolotonosha-Lubny-Sula-Sumy-Sudzha. The separating line between Southeastern and Southwestern Ukrainian dialects runs (north to south) from the western outskirts of Bila Tserkva through Uman and Ananiiv and up to the Dniester.

== Main features ==
The Southeastern dialects form the literary standard of Ukrainian. Phonetically, their closest relatives are the Podolian and southern Volhynian dialects, while their simplified syntax, morphology, and vocabulary are closer in nature to the Northern dialects.

=== Phonetics ===
Southeastern dialects are distinguished from Northern dialects by retention of the phoneme [i]<[o],[e],[ě] in both stressed and unstressed syllables: жінка — жінкú, кістка — кісткú, дівка — дівчáта, ліс — лісú etc. They differ from Southwestern dialects by the general spread of unpalatalized consonants in compounds ки, хи, ги (лавкú, шляхú); distinction between palatalized and unpalatalized [r]; presence of lengthened consonants (зілля, насіння, життя); weaker palatalization of dental consonants, especially [s], [z], [t͡s]; lack of consonant devoicing before unvoiced consonants and in word-final position; preservation of compound вй (деревйаний, здоровйа).

In contrast to other dialects of Ukrainian, which historically used the /ɡ/ sound in foreign loanwords prior to the Ukrainian orthography of 1933, the Southeastern dialects have consistently used /ɦ/ both natively and in loanwords. According to a 1969 study by Valentyna Perebyinis, ⟨ɡ⟩ is one of the least-used sounds in the Southeastern dialects alongside /dʒ/ and /dz/, at a usage rate of 0.013. Southeastern dialects also have stress rules in some words, which differ from ones in Southwestern dialects.

=== Morphology ===
Unlike in Southwestern dialects, dative singular masculine ending -ові (синові, братові) is typical for Southeastern dialects along with locative sg. masc.-і in words such as (на) коні, землі, тіні, полі. Genitive plural is formed with -ей (людей, очей, гостей). Verb forms and infinitives usually end with palatalized [t]: він кричить, вони кричать, кричіть, брать, казать, but берегти. Particle ся in Southeastern dialects is only used after the verb: я миюся, ти мене боїшся.

== Origins ==
The exact origins of the Southeastern dialects is a matter of some debate. Vsevolod Hantsov and Olena Kurylo argued that they originated from speakers of the other two dialects during the Ukrainian settlement of the Wild Fields, while Leonid Bulakhovskyi and Fedot Zhylko have asserted that the Southeastern dialects directly descend from the Polanians. The Encyclopedia of Ukraine rejects the latter hypothesis.

== Classification ==
Southeastern Ukrainian comprises three dialects: Middle Dnieprian, spoken in Dnieper Ukraine; Slobozhan, spoken in Sloboda Ukraine; and the Steppe dialect, spoken on the Wild Fields. The Slobozhan and Steppe dialects are both relatively young, having emerged from Middle Dnieprian no earlier than the 16th century.
