= Podolian dialect =

Dialect of Ukrainian

Podolian or Podillian dialect (Ukrainian: Подільський говір) is a dialect of Ukrainian language spoken in the historical region of Podolia (Ukrainian: Поділля, Podillia) in central-western areas of Ukraine. It is usually classified as part of Southwestern Ukrainian dialects and is the easternmost dialect in the group.

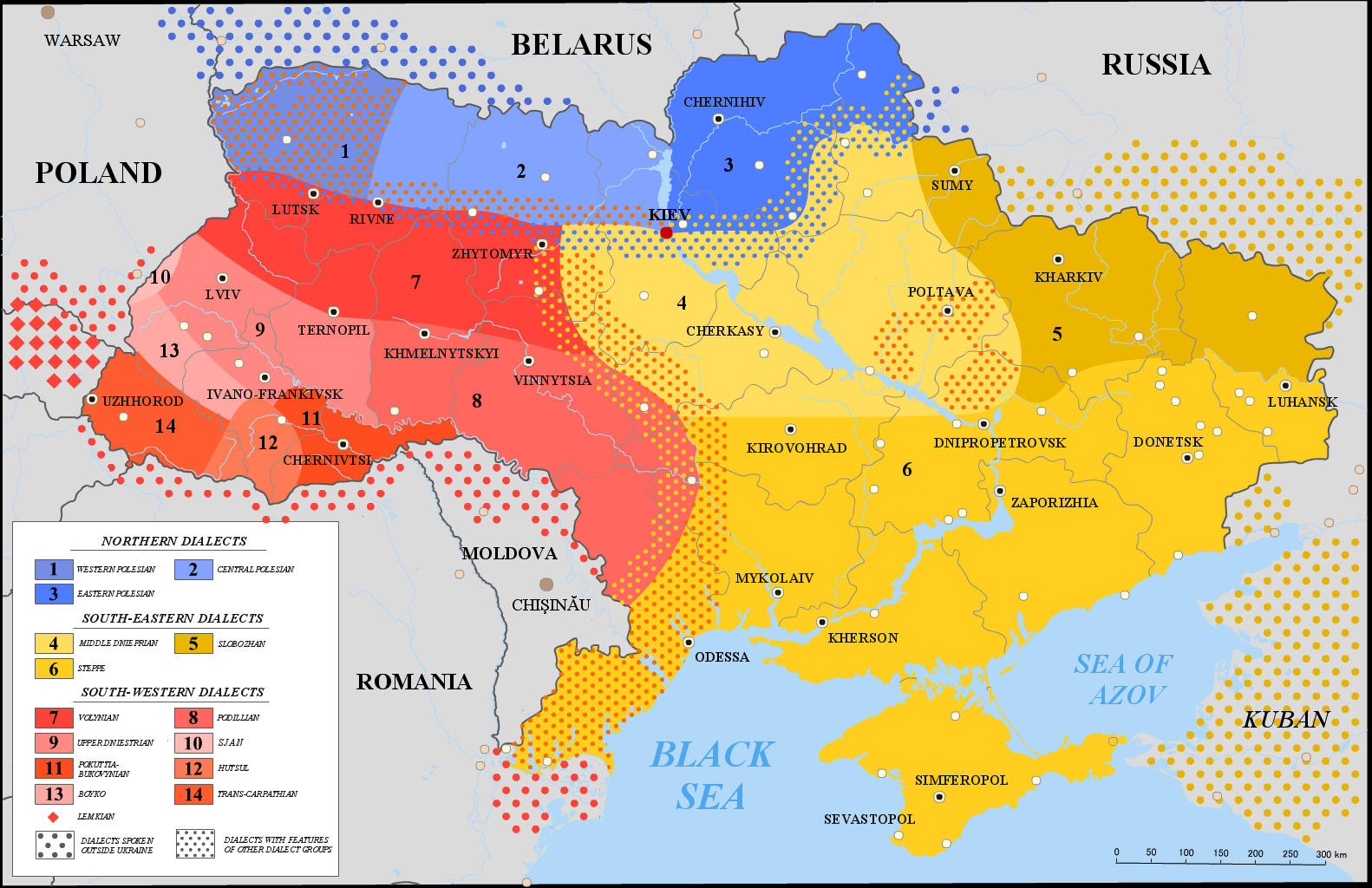
Podolian dialect is spoken in areas marked with no. 8 on the map

== History ==
Podolian dialect formed in the historical lands of the Rus' Principality of Terebovlia and the latter Podolian and Bratslav Voivodeships of the Polish-Lithuanian Commonwealth. Main features of the dialect were first described by Ivan Vahylevych in 1845.

== Area ==
The territory where Podolian dialect is spoken covers the southern parts of Khmelnytskyi and Vinnytsia regions, western parts of Cherkasy, Kirovohrad and Mykolaiv regions, as well as northern parts of Odesa region. This area borders Southwestern Ukrainian dialects (Dniestrian, Pokuttia-Bukovynian and Volhynian), as well as Southeastern Ukrainian dialects (Middle Dnieper and Steppe dialects).

== Main features ==
=== Phonetics ===
- merger of vowels [e], [ɪ] and [o], [ʊ] in an unstressed position: силó [seˈɫɔ], шерóкий [ʃeˈrɔkɪi̯], туб’í [tʊˈbʲi], дуп’íк [dʊˈpʲik];
- lack of transition of [a] into [ɛ], [i] after palatalized consonants (except western varieties);
- lack of palatalization in [r] before vowels: бурáк [bʊˈrɑk], радóк [rɐˈdɔk], расни́й [rɐsˈnɪi̯], зорá [zoˈrɑ], говóру [ɦoˈwɔrʊ] (standard Ukrainian pronunciation - буряк [bʊˈrʲɑk], рядок [rʲɐˈdɔk], рясний [rʲɐsˈnɪi̯], зоря [zoˈrʲɑ], говорю [ɦoˈwɔrʲʊ]);
- palatalization in compounds ки, хи: шпакьи [ʃpɐˈkʲɪ], гріхьи [ɦrʲiˈxʲɪ];
- in southern varieties: lack of palatalization in word-final [t͡s]: хлопец [ˈxɫɔpet͡s], місяц [mʲisʲɐt͡s] (standard Ukrainian - хлопець [ˈxɫɔpet͡sʲ], місяць [ˈmʲisʲɐt͡sʲ]);
- lack of palatalization in [t], [d], [n], [s], [z], [l] before [i] that stems from etymological [o]: ніс [nis], сік [sik], стіл [stiɫ], лій [lij] (standard Ukrainian [nʲis], [sʲik], [sʲtʲiɫ], [lʲij]);
- insertion of [lʲ], [nʲ] after labial consonants: рипл’áх [repˈlʲɑx], здорóўл’а [zdoˈrɔʊ̯lʲɐ], мн’áсо [ˈmnʲɑsɔ] (standard Ukrainian репʼях [repˈjɑx], здоровʼя [zdɔˈrɔʊ̯jɐ], мʼясо [ˈmjɑsɔ]);
- transition of [v] into [m] in -vn-: рíмний [ˈrimnɪi̯], дамнó [dɐmˈnɔ] (standard Ukrainian рівний [ˈrʲiu̯nɪi̯], давно [dɐu̯ˈnɔ]);
- insertion of consonants [w], [ɦ] before word-initial vowels: госінь [ˈɦɔsʲinʲ], восінь [ˈwɔsʲinʲ], горати [ɦoˈratɪ], ворати [woˈratɪ];
- lack of gemination in consonants: нас’íн’а, кор’íн’а, жит’á;
- lack of palatalization of word-final [t] in verbs: рóбит, нóсит, рóбл’ат, нóс’ат, роб’íт, нос’íт;
- lack of dental consonant transition into sibilants in verb forms: хóд’у, нóс’у, крýт’у, вóд’у.

=== Morphology ===
- lack of differentiation between "soft" and "hard" stems in declination of nouns: кон’óв’і, товáришов’і, кон’óм, товáришом, земл’óйу, долóн’ойу, грýшойу, пóлʼом;
- ending of singular feminine nouns in instrumental case is -ою, but in western varieties endings of feminine single nouns in instrumental case have the form -еў or -оў, -ом: землéў, душéў, земл’óў, душóў, земл’óм, душóм;
- in southern varieties single nouns of 3rd declension in genitive have the ending -и: сóли, смéрти; certain nouns in locative case have the ending -ох: у с’íн’ох, у грýд’ох;
- shortening of feminine adjective and possessive pronouns in dative and locative cases: зелéн’і трав’í, на зелéн’і трав’í;
- lack of differentiation between "soft" and "hard" word stems in adjectives: си́ний, дáвний;
- usage of suffix -ішч for creation of comparative forms: добр’íшчий, син’íшчий;
- presence of analytical and synthetic future forms: роби́тиму, бýду роби́ти і бýду роби́ў;
- in western varieties: widespread use of complex past verb forms (роби́лис-мо, роби́лис-те); use of particle ся in pre-word position (де ся ти дíла).
- presence of archaic past tense forms -йем, -йесь, -сьмо, -сьте (ходивйем).
- 2nd declination 3rd person verbs in singular: рóбе, хóде.

=== Lexical features ===
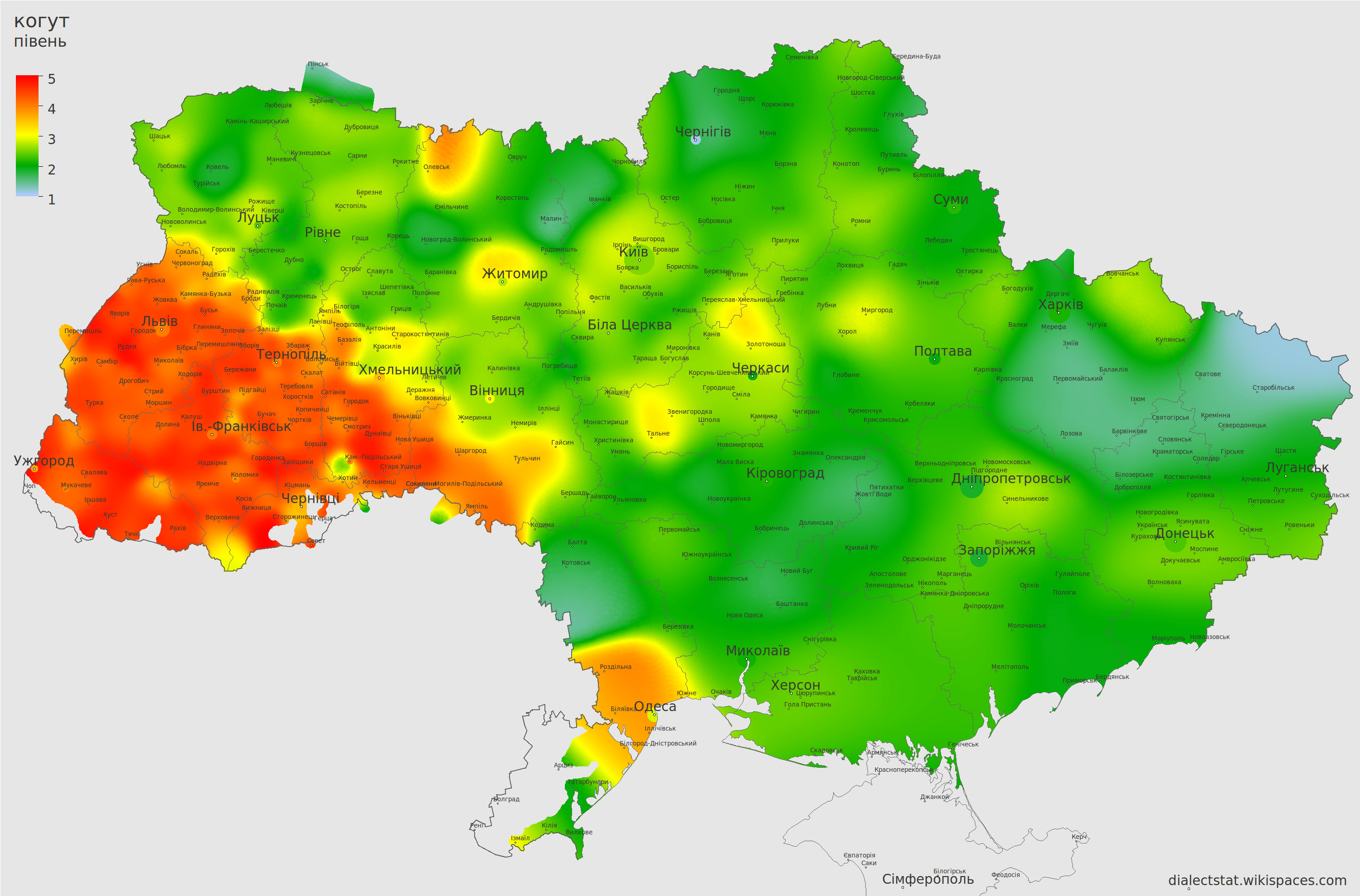
Usage of the word когут (kohut) for rooster generally corresponds to the area where Podolian and other Southwestern Ukrainian dialects are spoken

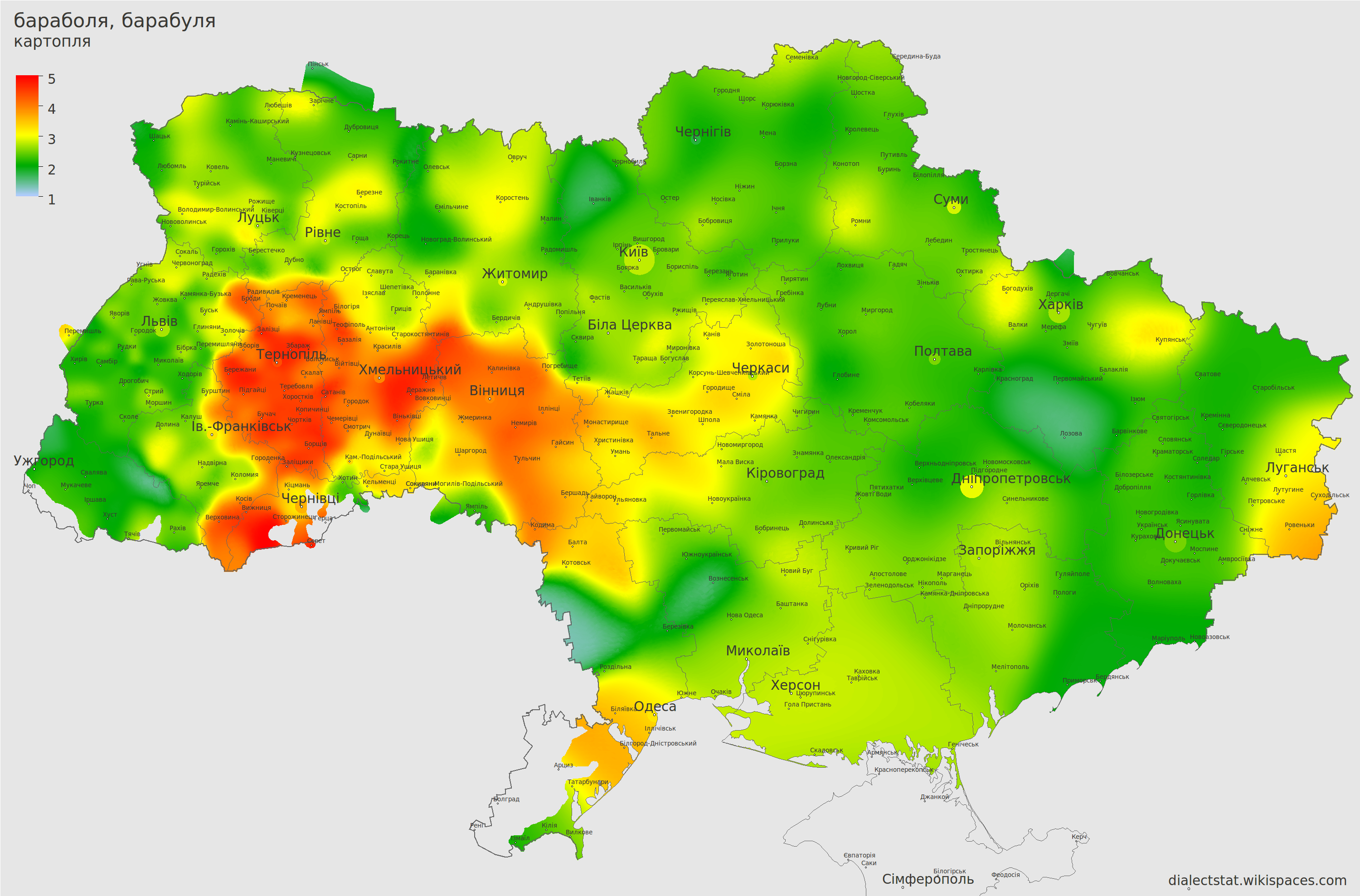
The common word for potato in Podolian and some neighbouring dialects is бараболя (barabolya)

Dialectal words used in Podolian dialect
Podolian dialect	Standard Ukrainian	English	Notes
най (nay)	хай, нехай (khay, nekhay)	"let it be"	
когут (kohut)	півень (piven')	rooster	
рішча (rishcha)	хмиз (khmyz)	brashwood	
комарі (komari)	мурашки (murashky)	small insects, ants	in standard Ukrainian the word комарі is used in the meaning "mosquitoes"
заводять (zavod'at')	виють (vyyut')	(they) howl	used in respect to wolves
чорногуз (chornohuz)	лелека (leleka)	stork	
шматок (shmatok)	кусок (kusok)	piece	
папйоша (papyosha)	кукурудза (kukurudza)	maize	from Romanian
бурдей (burdey)	землянка (zemlyanka)	pit-house	from Romanian
баюра (bayura)	калюжа (kalyuzha)	puddle	
варцаба (vartsaba)	одвірок (odvirok)	doorpost	from Polish

== In literature ==
Podolian dialect is used in works of Ukrainian authors such as Marko Vovchok, Anatoli Svydnytsky, Stepan Rudansky, Mykhailo Kotsiubynsky, as well as in ethnographic collections by Mykhailo Maksymovych and Pavlo Chubynsky.
