= Eastern Polesian dialect =

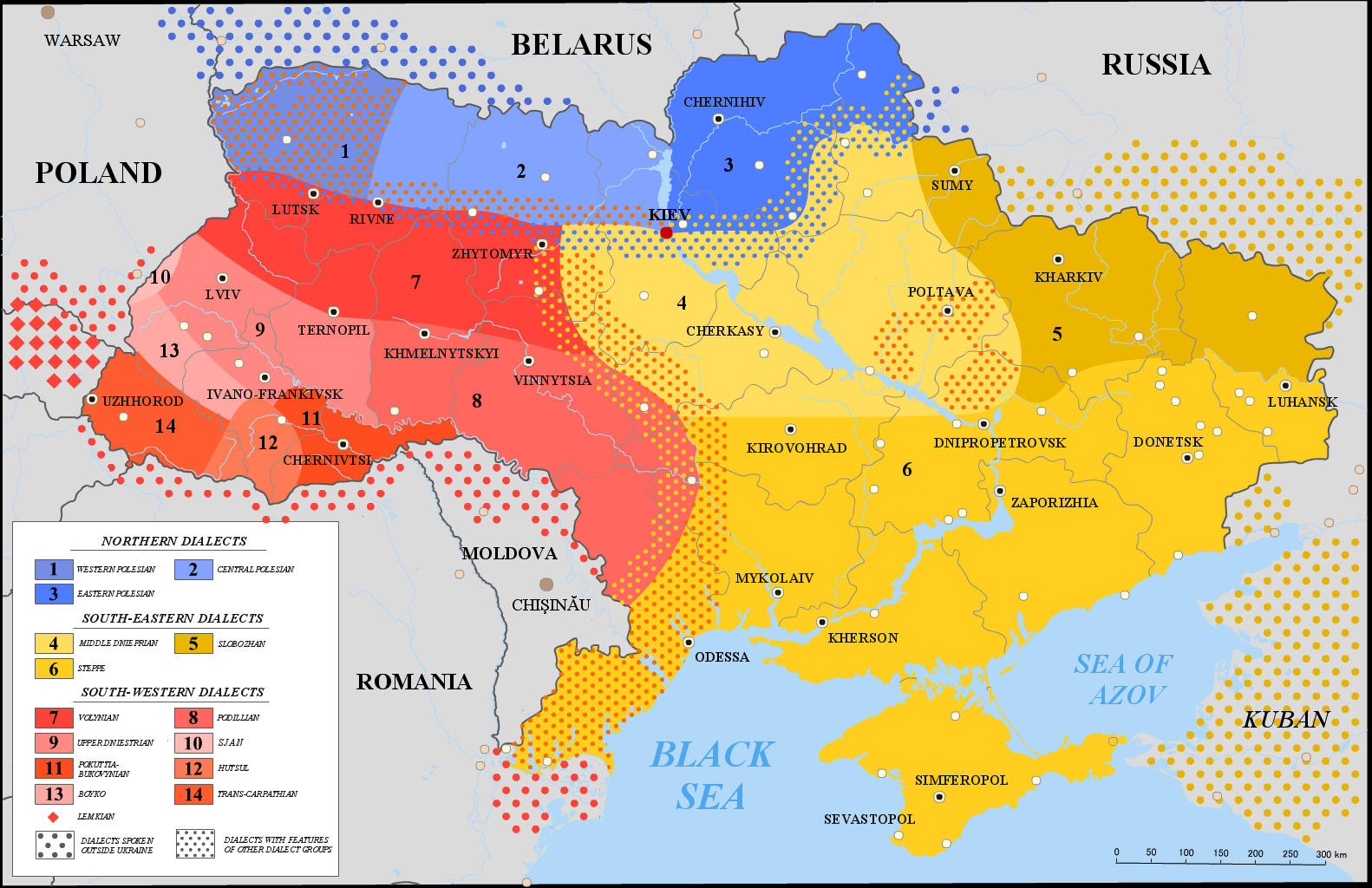
Map of Ukrainian dialects, with Eastern Polesian marked with No.3

Eastern Polesian dialect (Ukrainian: Східнополіський говір), also known as Left-bank Polesian dialect (Лівобережнополіський говір) or Desna dialect (Наддеснянський говір) belongs to Northern Ukrainian dialects and is widespread in the northern areas of Kyiv, Chernihiv and Sumy regions of Ukraine, as well as parts of Bryansk, Kursk, Belgorod and Voronezh regions of Russia. Eastern Polesian contains numerous archaisms. Philologists consider it to be descended from ancient dialects used by Polans and Severians.

== Geography and subdivisions ==
The border between Eastern Polesian dialect and Middle Dnieprian dialect in the south runs along the line Kyiv-Pryluky-Konotop and up to the river Seym. Its western border follows along the Dnieper and separates it from Central Polesian dialect. In the north and northeast the dialect's territory borders areas where Belarusian and Russian dialects are spoken.

Eastern Polesian dialect is further subdivided into three groups, of which the southern one is closer to Middle Dnieprian dialect, the northern one demonstrates influence of Belarusian dialects, and the eastern one was significantly influenced by migration processes.

== Main features ==
=== Phonetics ===
Eastern Polesian varieties contain from 4 to 6 vowels in unstressed position, but when stressed this number can reach up to 8 phonemes. Its phonetics are characterized with following features:

- presence of diphthongs in place of etymological [o], [e], [ě]: вуол [ʋu̯ˈɔl], піеч [pʲi̯ˈɛt͡ʃ], діед [dʲi̯ˈɛd];
- widespread presence of akanye: галавá [ɦɐlɐˈwɑ], пабіегла [pɐˈbʲi̯ɛɦlɐ], вадá [ʋɐˈdɑ];
- lack of merger between [e] and [ɪ] in unstressed positions;
- remnants of etymological [i] (in southwestern varieties);
- loss of [j] between the prefix and word root: ви́шла [ˈʋɪʃlɐ], зан’али́ [zɐnʲɐˈlɪ];
- presence of palatalized labial consonants and [t͡ʃ] in some varieties;
- [f]>[x], [xʋ]: худбóл, хвáра;
- lack of devoicing in word-final consonants: зуб [zub], кров [krɔu̯];
- apheresis: доднóйі [dodˈnɔji] (standard Ukrainian - до одної [do.odˈnɔji].

=== Grammar ===
- Ending -у in masculine and neutrum singular verbs: д’áд’ку, селý;
- presence of full and shortened instrumentative forms of nouns: рукóйу — рукóй, шóстойу — шóстой, мнóйу — мнóй;
- lack of initial [n] in 3rd person singular pronouns: до йійі, з йем;
- shortening of masculine adjectives and participles (си́н’і, дóбри, стари́, годóвани), with simultaneous presence of complex forms of feminine ones (дóўгайа, жóўтейе, but shortened under stress - жóўта, бóса);
- use of infinitive suffix -т’: гаманіет’, бит’;
- complex form of future tense: буду робит’, буду слухат’;
- use of preposition помеж [ˈpɔmeʒ] + genitive of nouns, in the meaning of "near" : пóмеж шкóли ("near the school"); use of preposition к (ік) + dative, "to": к брáту, ік сталý; л’а (л’е) + genitive, "by": л’а хáти, л’е ріечки; заза + instrumental, "after": заза мнóйу; наў + genitive plural (наў карт, наў мýрки);
- use of conjunctions да, дак to express both unity and opposition.

== In literature ==
Elements of Eastern Polesian dialects are present in works by Hanna Barvinok, Panteleimon Kulish, Stepan Vasylchenko, Pavlo Tychyna and Oleksandr Dovzhenko.

For a new study in English on East Polissian, see: Del Gaudio S. 2025. Ukrainian Border Dialects in Belarusian-Russian Contact Area. New York, London, Oxford etc. Bloomsbury Academic.
