= Western Polesian dialect of Ukrainian =

Western Polesian dialect (Ukrainian: Західнополіський говір), also known as Volhynian-Polesian dialect (Волинсько-поліський говір) is a dialect of Ukrainian language. Classified among Northern Ukrainian dialects, it also contains some features of Southwestern Ukrainian dialects.

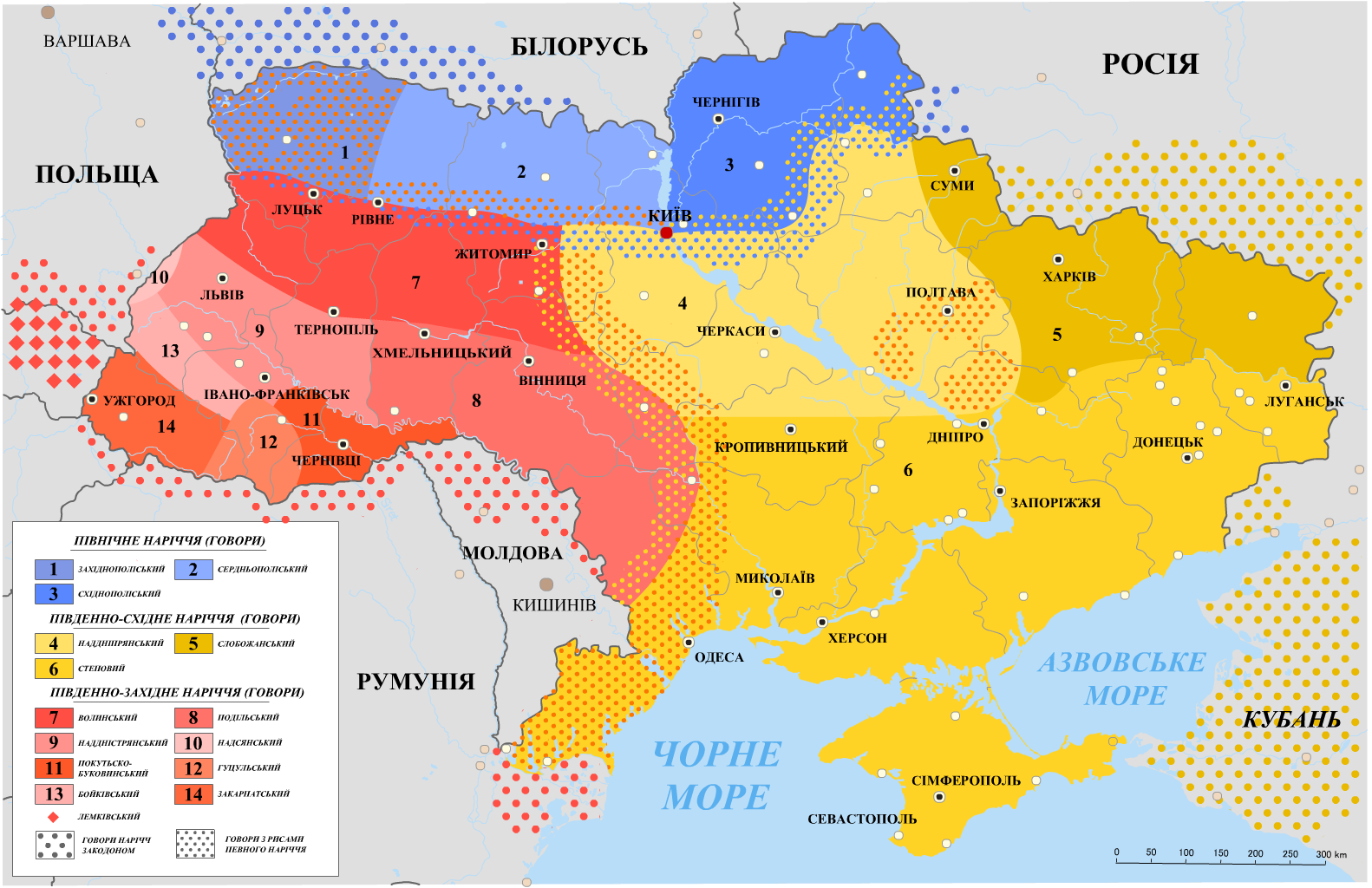
Map of Ukrainian dialect with Western Polesian marked with No.1

== Geography ==
The dialect is spread in most of Volyn Oblast and northwestern parts of Rivne Oblast of Ukraine, as well as in the areas of Brest and Pinsk in Belarus. Its territory in the west reaches the Buh, but also including areas on the western bank, where the closely related Podlachian dialect is spoken. There is no clear border with Belarusian dialects in the north, and local varieties are considered to be transitional to Belarusian. The dividing line with Central Polesian dialect in the east runs from the mouth of Styr along the Horyn in the direction of Lutsk. In the south the zone of the dialect's spread reaches the line Volodymyr–Lutsk–Styr river. Varieties in the southern part of the area are transitional with Southwestern Ukrainian.

== History ==
The dividing line between Western and Central Polesian dialects corresponds to the historical eastern border of Cherven lands, which were populated by the tribe of Buzhans (Volhynians), part of the Dulebe tribal union.

== Main features ==
=== Phonetics ===
- In closed syllables: etymological [o]>[u], [ɪ], [i] (кун’ [kunʲ], вул [ʋul] / кин’ [kɪnʲ], вил [ʋɪl] / кіин’, віил / кін’ [kʲinʲ], віл [ʋʲil]); etymological [e]>[u], [y], [ɪ], [i] (прин’ýс [prɪˈnʲus], прин’ÿс [prɪˈnʲys], прин’íс [prɪˈnʲis], жíнка, піч, шіст’, с’ім).
- etymological [ě]>[i] (сн’іг, с’іно, л’іс, л’ісá), in unstressed position also [ɪ] (мишóк, писóк).
- merger of unstressed [e] and [ɪ] (сеилó, теипéр, пос’íйиш).
- merger of unstressed [o] and [u] (гуолýбка, куожýх).
- presence of both palatalized and unpalatalized consonants in combinations ги, ки, хи/гі, кі, хі.
- frequent devoicing of consonants in word-final position and before unvoiced consonants (сóлотко, моурóс, сат).
- widespread use of prothetic consonants [w], [ɦ] (гоувéс, гóко, вýлиц’а).
- frequent transition [a]>[e] in stressed positions after palatalized consonants and sibilants (вз’еў, д’éкувати, т’éжко, душ’е); in southern varieties also after [j] (йéма, йéгода, йéблуко).

=== Morphology ===
- Widespread use of endings -ови, -еви in dative singular of masculine nouns (си́нови, брáтови, дýбови, конéви).
- presence of ending -и in dative/locative of feminine nouns (ви́шни — на ви́шни, ли́пи — на ли́пи).
- parallel use of endings -ам, -ах/-ом, -ох in dative and locative of masculine nouns (волáм — волóм, столáм — столóм).
- use of infinitive forms -ти, -чи (ходи́ти, носи́ти, могчи́, пеи(к)чи́) - common with Southwestern dialects.
- presence of composite future forms буду ходи́ти, му ходи́ти.
- use of suffix -иско - common with Southwestern dialects.

=== Syntax ===
- Use of constructions нас булó двох, мен’í боли́т’ головá - common with Southwestern dialects.

== Subdialects ==
Northwestern border of Ukrainian dialects (green) according to Aleksandr Rittikh (1875), including the areas where Berestian and Podlachian varieties are spoken

Berestian varieties of the dialect are geographically separated from the rest of its territory by the Pripyat river and have a comparatively small influence of Southwestern Ukrainian dialects.

Podlachian (Buh) varieties are characterized by a number of special features resulting from Polish rule and historical connections of its speakers with lands around the Dniester, which results in the presence of many features of Southwestern dialects.

These groups of dialects are characterized with the preservation of diphthongs [uo], [ue], [ui](вуол, муой, вуел, муей, вуіл, куін’), or their replacement with [y] ([kynʲ], [ʋyl]); the diphthongs [ie] and [ɪe] are also preserved (хміел’, с’и́ено, л’іес, т’и́есто); more prevalent palatalization of consonants (рокí, мурахí, нóчі); use of composite past tense forms (ходи́лис’мо, ходи́лис’те, ходи́лихмо, бýл’іхмо).

A distinct feature of Podlachian dialect is the absence of palatalized [r] (зора, упрами); use of [ɪ] in plural endings (чисти, батькови); feminine singular instrumental endings -ойу, -ейу (рукойу, душейу); presence of labiodental [v] (сусьідів [sʊˈsʲidʲiʋ]).
