= Central Polesian dialect =

Ukrainian dialect

Central Polesian or Middle Polesian dialect (Ukrainian: Середньополіський говір), also known as Right-bank Polesian (Правобережнополіський говір) or Prypiat dialect (Надприп'ятський говір) belongs to Northern Ukrainian dialects and is spoken in the northern areas of Kyiv, Zhytomyr and Rivne oblasts of Ukraine, part of the historical region of Polesia.

== Geographic area ==
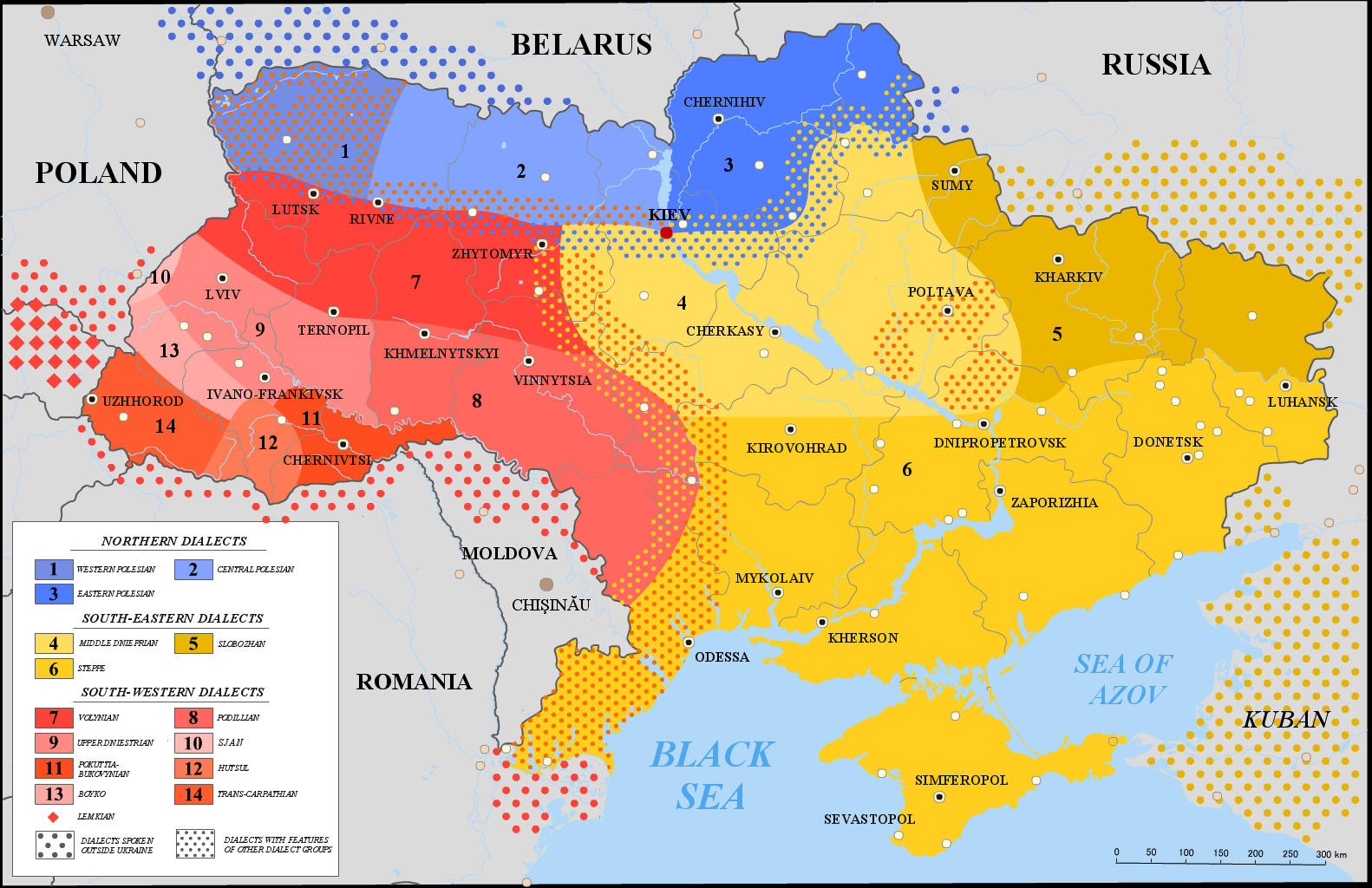
Map of Ukrainian dialects, with Central Polesian marked with No.2

In its south, the territory where Central Polesian dialect is spoken borders the areas dominated by Volhynian dialect along an approximate line passing north of Rivne and Zviahel, along the Ubort river, north of Zhytomyr, along the right bank of Irsha river, north of Kyiv and up to the confluence of Oster and Desna rivers in Left-bank Ukraine. In the west, the border with Western Polesian runs along the western bank of Horyn up to the Prypiat river. The eastern margin of the dialect is represented by the Dnieper, and the northern one approximately corresponds to the Belarus–Ukraine border.

== Main features ==
=== Phonetics ===
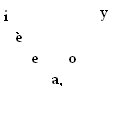
Vowel chart of Central Polesian dialect

- Presence of numerous diphthongs and rounded monophthongs in place of etymological [o], [e], [ě]: порвêг [porˈwɪɦ], стêл/ствêл [st(w)ɪl], с’êм [sʲɪm] (standard Ukrainian - поріг [poˈrʲiɦ], стіл [sʲtʲil], сім [sʲim]); contrast between [o]-[ɔ], [ɪ]-[ɛ] in closed syllables: д’êн’ [dʲɪnʲ] - д’ен’ [dʲɛnʲ], пôл’шча [ˈpolʲʃt͡ʃɐ] - Пóл’шча [ˈpɔlʲʃt͡ʃɐ];
- neutralization of vowels stemming from [ě], [ę], [ō] in unstressed positions: с’êн’і - сенéй, ос’êн’н’і - óсені, сéла - селó, сôк - сóк’і; unstressed [a]>[ɛ] following [j] and palatalized consonants: йáловка - йеловчýк; вони ходеть, носеть;
- presence of geminated consonants: житьтье [ʒɪˈtʲːɛ], ломачче [loˈmat͡ʃːɛ];
- lack of merger between [o]-[u], [e]-[ɪ].

=== Morphology ===
- Particle -ся always follows the verb and cannot be moved;
- ending [ě] in genitive and locative singular, nominative plural of "soft" and "mixed" nouns: багáто головн’ê, поломáл’іса тройн’ê; ending -i in unstressed position: немá дóл’і, вôн на пóл’і, мéж’і; same rule applies to nominative masculine plural nouns: драгл’ê, драбцê, ковал’ê, оплéн’і, дрéгл’і, хлóпціи;
- shortened ending forms in masculine adjectives (дóбр’і, си́н’і) and in imperative mood (б’і); archaic superlative forms (с’іл’н’êйш’і);
- dative masculine singular ending is exclusively -у, not -ов’і, -ев’і: чоловіеку;
- lack of prothetic н- in 3rd person pronouns: до йогó, у йейê;

=== Vocabulary ===
The dialect is divided into several smaller groups distinguished by presence of locally used terms.

==== Examples ====
Upper Slovechna	Lower Uzh	Ubort	Standard Ukrainian	English
мармýл’ (marmúl')	кул’бáка (kul'báka)	бамбул’áка (bambul'áka)	"наріст на дереві" (naríst...)	"outgrowth of a tree"
