= Northern Ukrainian dialects =

Group of dialects of the Ukrainian language

- Північне наріччя
- Region: Polesia, Podlachia
- Language family: Indo-European: Slavic; East Slavic; Ukrainian; Northern Ukrainian dialects

Language codes
- ISO 639-3: –
- Glottolog: nort2599
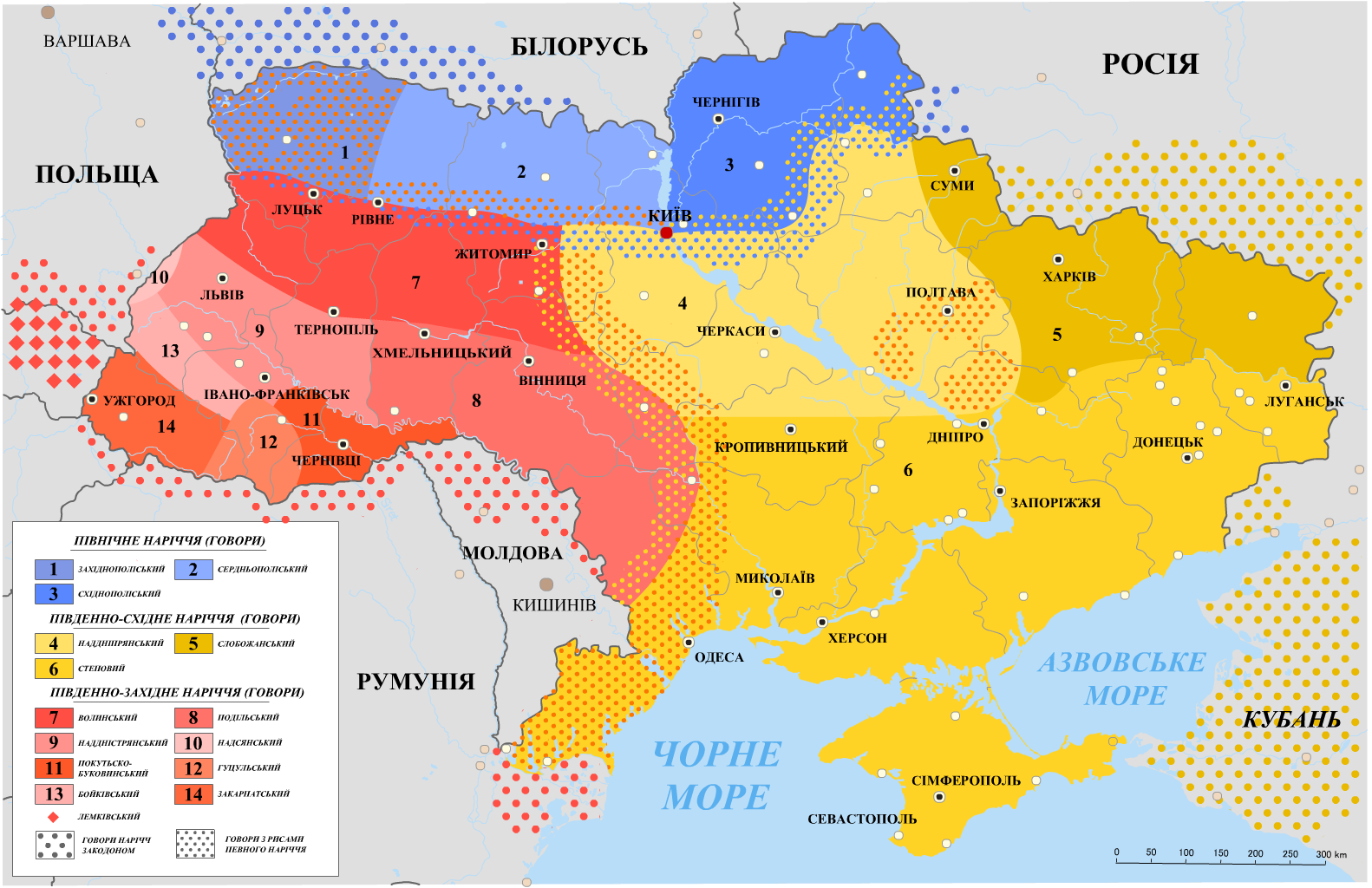
- Modern Ukrainian dialects. Northern Ukrainian is shown in blue. Western Polesian (1) Central Polesian (2) Eastern Polesian (3)

The Northern Ukrainian dialects (Ukrainian: Північне наріччя, romanized: Pivnichne narichchia), also called the Polesian dialects (Ukrainian: Поліське наріччя, romanized: Poliske narichchia), are one of the three main dialect groups of the Ukrainian language, along with Southeastern and Southwestern. Northern Ukrainian is a transitional dialect to the Belarusian language, which is located to the north.

A defining characteristic of the Northern dialects is archaic vocalism of stressed vowels, or, in the case of letters "о" and "е", the usage of monophthongs when stressed. The letter "а" also acquires a sound similar to standard Ukrainian "е" when not stressed and preceded by a palatised consonant.

The northern dialects share a simplified morphology with the Southeastern dialects, which they played a critical role in forming. Some more northwestern dialects, located in Podlachia, however, lack this simplified morphology.

In contrast to the Southeastern dialects, which form Ukrainian's literary standard within Ukraine, and the Southwestern dialects, which are the literary standard of the Ukrainian diaspora, the Northern dialects are much less frequent in Ukrainian culture. Lesya Ukrainka's play The Forest Song is one of the most significant works in the Northern dialects.

== Dialects ==
The Northern dialects are composed of three different dialects: the Western Polesian dialect, the Central Polesian dialect, and the Eastern Polesian dialect. Western Polesian transitions into the Southwestern dialects in the south, while Central and Eastern Polesian are separated by the Dnieper river.

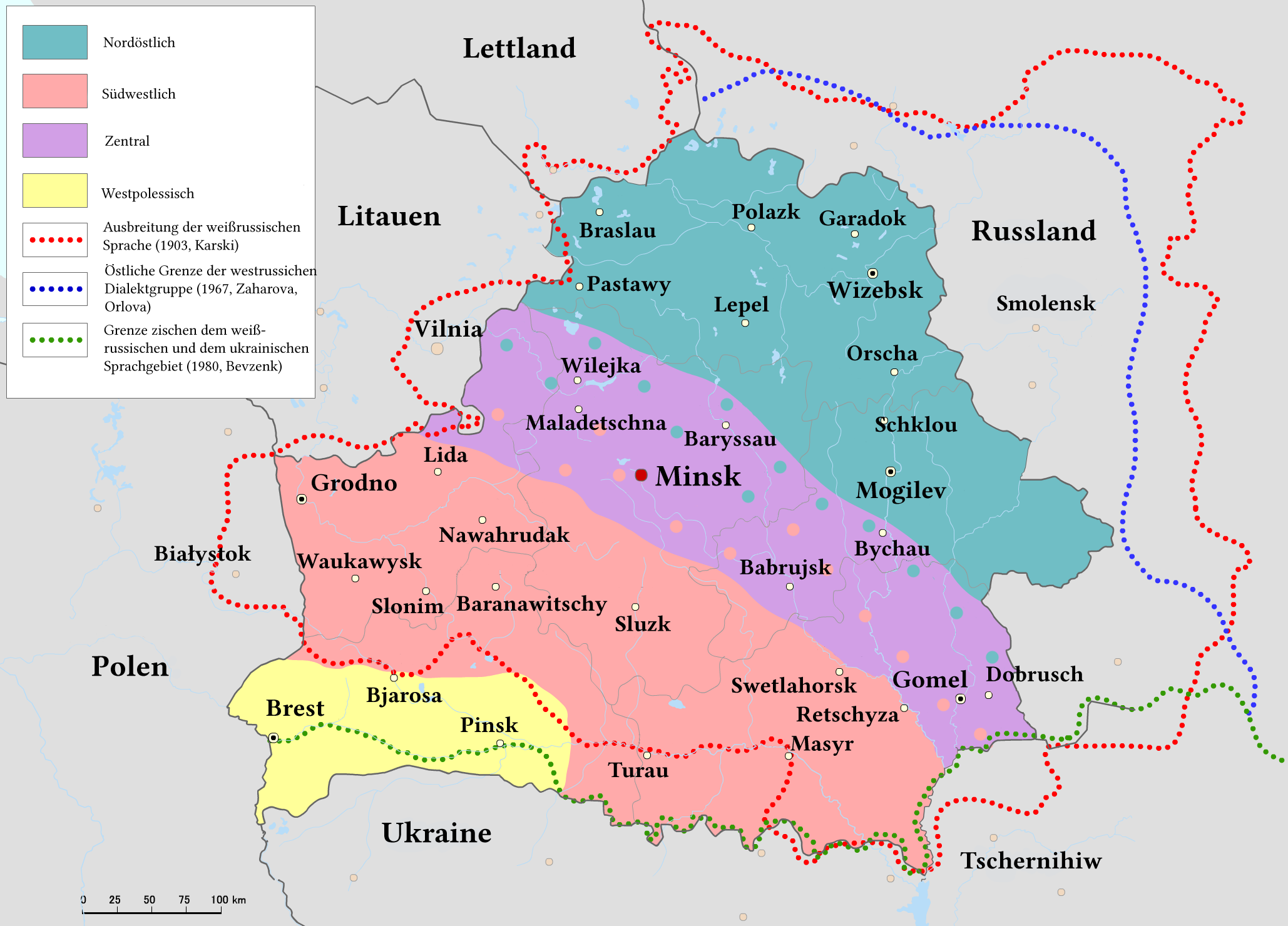
Dialect map of Belarus with the yellow part speaking the Western Polesian dialect

== Common features ==
Northern Ukrainian dialects are distinguished from Southeastern and Southwestern Ukrainian dialects by following features:

- pronunciation of vowels derived from [ę], [ě], [o], [e] differs in stressed and unstressed positions: пʼять - пети, хоʼдячі - ʼходечі, яма - ємкі, дід - дидок, лěс - лесок etc;
- unlike in other Ukrainian dialects, traces of long [o] and [e] are preserved in many Polesian varieties: туôк, твêк, твиêк, твик, тêк, тик, тиік, тіик; вуôл, вуêл, вуил, вил, вôл, вêл, вол, вул; п(й)іêч, п(й)êч, п(й)іч; с’êм, с’іêм; м’ін’ê; бêли, бйêли, бйіêли;
- opposition between those vowels is neutralized in unstressed positions: сенá, сем’і, петáк, перó;
- masculine adjective forms are shortened (так’і, чет’вôрти, пострóйани), unlike feminine and plural ones (дóбрайа, такéйе, пр’іч’íннийе, так’íйе, пострóйанийе),
- in some varieties archaic plural forms of nouns are preserved: дай б’ікôм с’êна; у корчôх совйак’í ростýт.

== Lexical features ==
Different varieties of the Northern group are distinguished by their own specific dialectisms. For example in Western (Volhynian) Polesian the words морóчн’а (morochnya), стýбла (stubla), чáква (chakva), тлан’ (tlan') are used in the meaning of "bog"; corresponding words in Central Polesian varieties are з’д’в’іж (zdvizh), ств’íга (stviha), драгá (drahá), and in Eastern Polesian - тóпкайе балóта (topkaye balota).

== See also ==
- West Polesian language
